= Harti =

Sub-clan of the Somali Darod clan

Harti هَرْتِي
- Darod Somali Clan
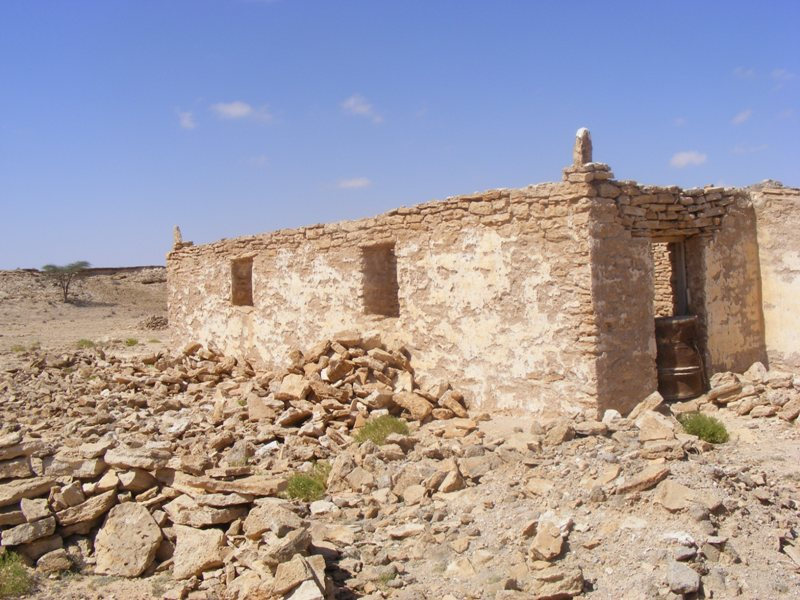
- Sheikh Harti's tomb in Qa’ableh, Somalia
- Ethnicity: (Somalia) Somali
- Location: Somalia (Ethiopia) Ethiopia (Kenya) Kenya (Oman) Oman; Yemen (United Arab Emirates) UAE
- Descended from: Sheikh Abdirahman bin Isma'il al-Jabarti
- Parent tribe: Darod
- Branches: Bah Majeerteen: Mohamed Harti (Majeerteen); Mohamoud Harti (Warsangali); Ahmed Harti (Dishishe); Bah Arab: Said Harti (Dhulbahante); Abdirahman Harti (Kaskiqabe); Guul Harti (Geesiguule); Liibaangashe
- Language: (Somalia) Somali (Arab League) Arabic
- Religion: Sunni Islam

Harti (Somali: Harti) is a Somali clan that traces its lineage back to Saleh Abdi Harti. They are a sub-clan of the larger Darod clan. Notable sub-clans within Harti include the Majeerteen, Warsengeli, Dishishe, and the Dhulbahante. They predominantly reside in the apex of the Horn of Africa and its surrounding regions. Furthermore, in the southern territories, the clan's settlements span both sides of the Kenya-Somalia border.

== Distribution ==
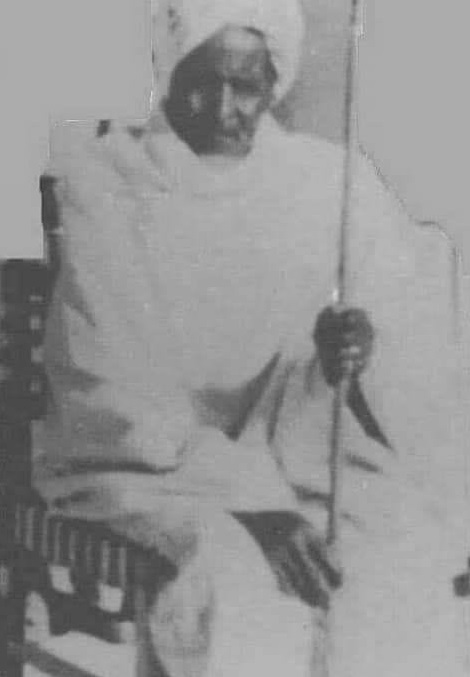
Commander-poet Ismail Mire (pictured) administered the largest infantry Shiikhyaale and Adan Ali Gurey the second-largest, Golaweyne.

The extended formal name of the Harti clan is Saleh Abdi Mohamed Abdirahman bin Isma'il al-Jabarti. The primary homeland of the Harti is the state of Puntland in northeastern Somalia as well as the self declared state of Somaliland. The clan is well represented in the regions of Sool, Sanaag, Togdheer, (primarily Buhoodle), Bari, Nugaal and Mudug. There is also a significant trading Harti community in the state of Jubaland particularly in the port city of Kismayo. In Ethiopia, they are well represented in the Dollo Zone, whilst they have a notable presence in the North Eastern Province of Kenya.

== History ==
=== Northern Sultanates ===
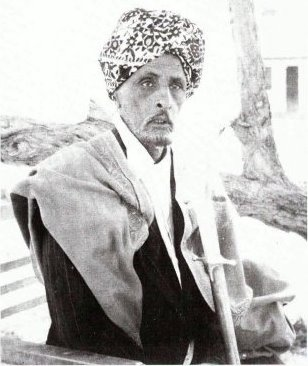
Mohamoud Ali Shire, Sultan of the Warsangali Sultanate

The Majeerteen Sultanate (Migiurtinia) was founded in the mid-18th century. It rose to prominence the following century, under the reign of the resourceful Boqor (King) Osman Mahamuud. Centred in Aluula, it controlled much of northern and central Somalia in the 19th and early 20th centuries. The polity maintained a robust trading network, entered into treaties with foreign powers, and exerted strong centralized authority on the domestic front.

With the gradual extension of European colonial rule into northern Somalia, all three sultanates were annexed to Italian Somaliland and British Somaliland in the early 20th century.

=== Darawiish sultanate-emirate-chieftainship ===
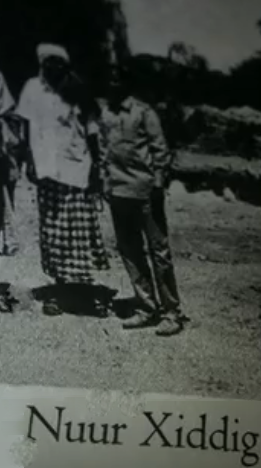
(Abdi) Nur Hedik (white shirt), wearing the emblematic Kuuk Darawiish prayer bead on his left wrist and the emblematic Darawiish duubcad turban on his head; Hedik was the commander of Dooxato (Darawiish cavalry) who had a Shiikhyaale division named after him, was of the western Ugaadhyahan clan.

The Darawiish, mostly hailed from the Dhulbahante and drew the majority of its followers from this clan; the four major Darawiish administrative divisions, i.e. Dooxato, Shiikhyaale, Golaweyne and Miinanle were near exclusively Dhulbahante. The Dhulbahante in Buuhodle were particularly the first and most persistent supporters of the Dervish chieftainship-emirate-sultanate. The Dervish chieftainship-sultanate resisted colonial occupation, especially the British who were aided by other Somali clans.

=== Foundation of Puntland ===
In 1998, the Harti community convened at Garowe to discuss their political future. The conference lasted for a period of three months. Attended by the area's political elite, traditional elders (Issims), members of the business community, intellectuals and other civil society representatives, the autonomous Puntland State of Somalia was established to deliver services to the population, offer security, facilitate trade, and interact with domestic and international partners. Abdullahi Yusuf Ahmed served as the fledgling state's founding president.

== Clan tree ==
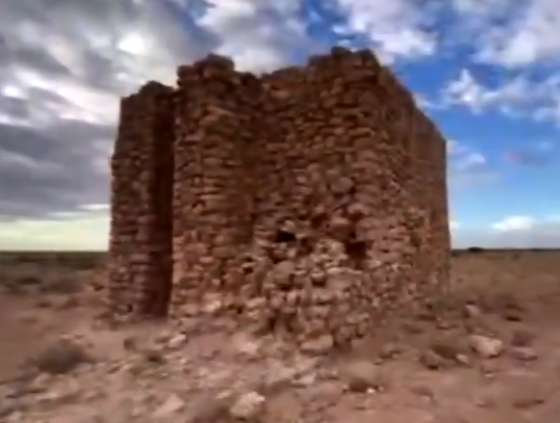
The Dalyare fort is a Dhulbahante garesa located in the Oodagooye basin; the Oodagooye basin being where the territories of the Dhulbahante sub-clans of Ugaasyo, Baharsame, Galool Oriye and western Ugaadhyahan converge.

There is no clear agreement on the clan and sub-clan structures and many lineages are omitted. The following listing is taken from the World Bank's Conflict in Somalia: Drivers and Dynamics from 2005 and the United Kingdom's Home Office publication, Somalia Assessment 2001.

- Abdirahman bin Isma'il al-Jabarti (Daarood)
  - Mohamed Darod (Kablalah)
    - Abdi Mohamed (Kombe)
      - Saleh Abdi (Harti)
        - Mohamed Harti (Majeerteen)
        - Mohamoud Harti (Warsangali)
        - Ahmed Harti (Dishiishe)
        - Said Harti (Dhulbahante)
        - Abdirahman Harti (Kaskiqabe)
        - Geesiguulle
        - Liibaangashe

== Notable Harti members ==
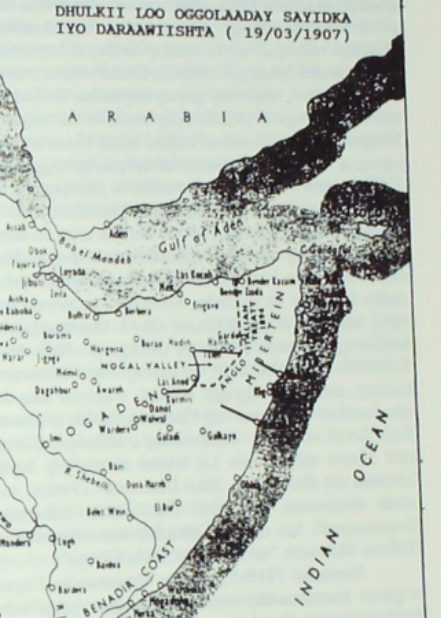
Territory of Darawiish sultan Diiriye Guure in 1907 (marked out in black ink delineation), according to Somali historian Muxamed Ibraahim Muxamed, consisted of the Ciid-Nugaal regions of Nugaal province, Las Anod District, Xudun District, Taleh District, Boocame District and Bookh District.

=== Commanders ===
- Nuurxaashi Cali, commander of one of the two Garbo subdivisions, named after himself
- Jaamac Cudur, commander of a Garbo (Darawiish) subdivision
- Osman Boss, commander of a Ragxun subdivision
- Cabbane Sugulle, commander of Burcadde-Godwein, a Darawiish administrative division
- Adan Ali Gurey, commander of Golaweyne
- Ali Meggar, Darawiish naval commander
- Suleiman Aden Galaydh, Darawiish commander at Cagaarweyne
- Nur Hedik, commander of Dooxato (the Darawiish cavalry) who had a Shiikhyaale regiment named after him
- Haji Yusuf Barre, commander of the biggest battle in Darawiish history, i.e. Jidbali; singlehanded defender of Taleh
- Yusuf Agararan, Jama Siad, led most successful Darawiish raid since Dul Madoba
- Ibraahin Xoorane, Darawiish commander who killed Richard Corfield
- Axmed Aarey, Darawiish artillery commander who abetted Richard Corfield's death
- Mohamed Abshir Muse, first commander of the Somali Police Force
- Abdullahi Ahmed Irro, Somali General, founded the National Academy for Strategy.
- Mohamed Adam Ahmed, former Chief of Staff of the Somali Armed Forces

=== Prime ministers & leaders ===
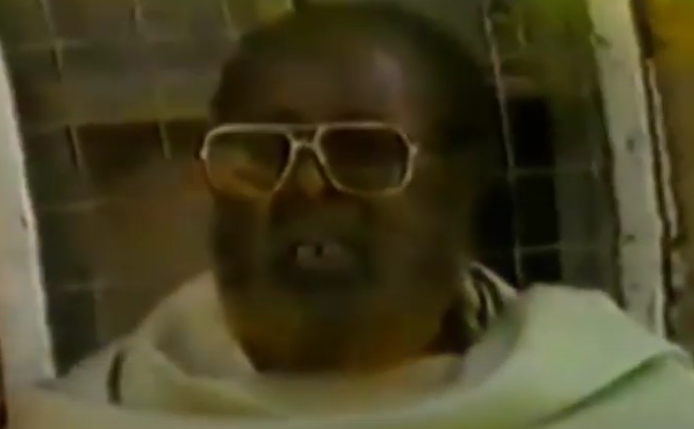
The Sugulle family had many Darawiish leaders, including Jama Sugulle (pictured) the revivor of Darawiishnimo in 1960 via eponymous Somali Darawiish police unit; Badhiidh Sugulle commanded Taargooye, Cabbane Sugulle commanded Burcadde-Godwein, Barni Sugulle was governor of Indhabadan, and Faarax Sugulle was head of haroun (government).

- Suleiman Haglotosiye, SSC president
- Cabbaas Xuseen, first prime minister of the Darawiish (1895 - 1900)
- Xaashi Suni Fooyaan, peace-time prime minister of the Darawiish (1905-1906)
- Ali Khalif Galaydh, Ex-Prime minister of Somalia and Khaatumo President.
- Abdiweli Gaas, former Prime Minister of Somalia, current President of Puntland.
- Abdullahi Yusuf Ahmed, former President of Somalia, President of Puntland and leader/co-founder of the Somali Salvation Democratic Front.
- Faarax Sugulle, head of the Darawiish haroun
- Sainab Ugas Yasin, First female parliamentarian of Puntland 1998–2008. Women's inclusion to politics advocate.
- Indhosheel, former Khatumo president
- Mohamed Abdi Hashi, President of Puntland, October 2004 – January 2005
- Abdirashid Shermarke, first Prime Minister of Somalia, second President of Somalia (10 June 1967 until 16 October 1969)
- Abdirizak Haji Hussein, former Prime Minister of Somalia (1964–1967), and former Secretary General of the Somali Youth League.
- Omar Sharmarke, Prime Minister of Somalia, and son of Abdirashid Sharmarke
- Abdirizak Jurile, Veteran politician and Former Somalia Minister of Planning, Head of numerous International agencies
- Mohamud Muse Hersi, third President of Puntland
- Abdihakim Amey, former Puntland vice-president
- Abdisamad Ali Shire, former Puntland vice-president
- Ahmed Elmi Osman, vice-president of Puntland since 2019
- Abdirahman Farole, former President of Puntland
- Barkhad Ali Salah, first mayor of Bosaso
- Mohamed Geedeeye, first mayor-representative of Caynabo for Garad Ali's USP party
- Ibrahim Eid, first mayor-representative of Xudun for Garad Ali's USP party
- Said Mohamed Rage, Founder of Puntland counter-piracy & maritime crimes authority

=== Enterprisers ===
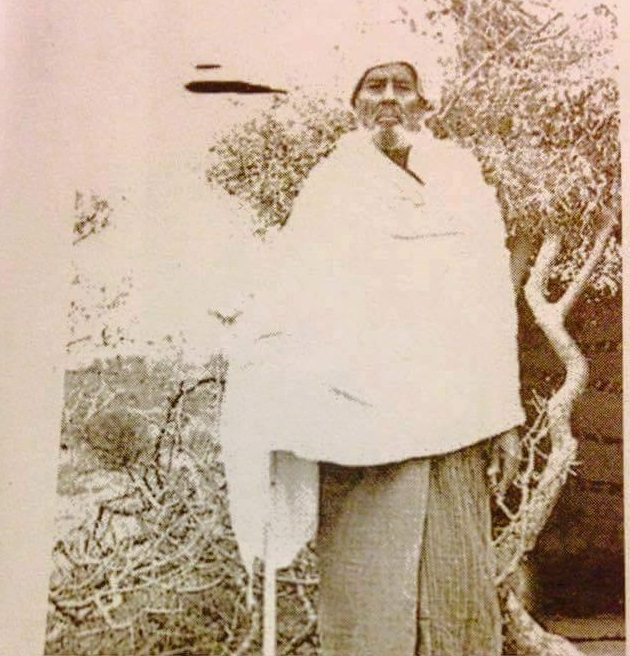
The last residents of the Silsilad fort were Haji Yusuf Barre, the singlehanded defender of Taleh, Mohamud Hosh (pictured), the last castellan of Taleh and Jama Biixi Kidin, an abandoned Darawiish child prisoner.

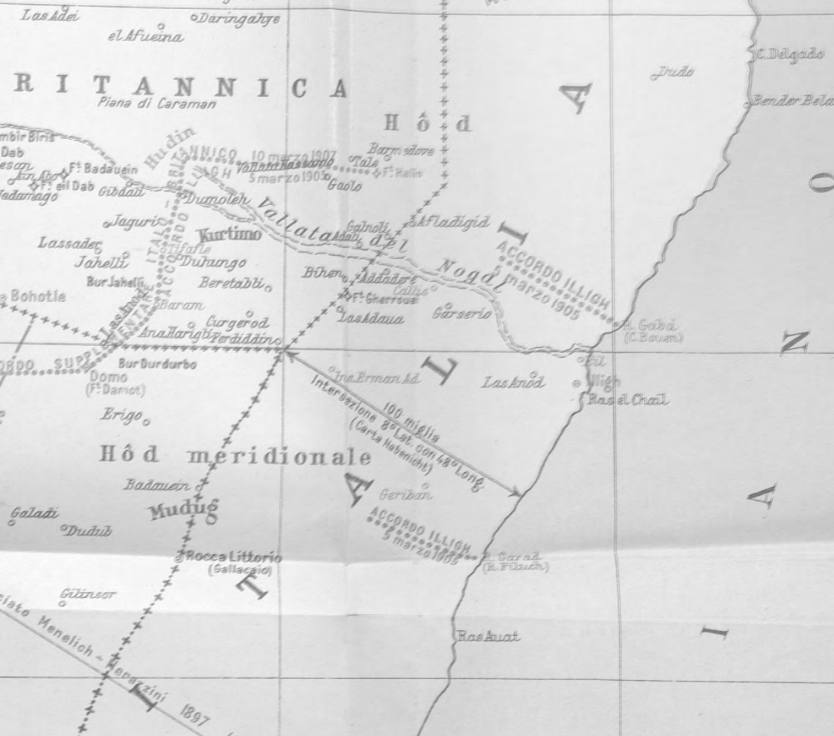
Ministero delle Colonie depicts that Illig treaty cedes Boocame district, Taleh district, Xudun district, Las Anod district, Bookh district (of Ethiopia) and Nugaal province territories to Darawiish.

- Aadan Carab, poet who documented the Dhulbahante genocide at the hands of European colonialists during the Darawiish era
- Afqarshe Ismail, former Darawiish spokesman-poet; and first person to die in an airstrike in Africa
- Ismail Mire, Darwiish supreme commander, poet
- Jama Biixi Kidin, last resident of Silsilad; Darawiish child prisoner
- Guled Adan, reverse engineer of electric toys
- Ali Awale, created Somalia's national anthem
- Aw Jama, Somali scholar, historian and collector of oral literature of Somalia. He wrote the first authoritative study of Dervishes.
- Saado Ali Warsame, singer-songwriter and former MP in the Federal Parliament of Somalia.
- Ali Dhuh, anti-darwiish poet.
- Kiin Jama, Somali artist
- Ali Haji Warsame, entrepreneur, former chief executive officer of Golis Telecom Somalia
- Amina Mohamed, former chairman of the INM and the WTO's General Council, and the current Secretary for Foreign Affairs of Kenya.
- Abdi Bile, Somalia's most decorated athlete with the most Somali national records
- Mohamed Suleiman, first ethnic Somali to win an Olympic medal
- Abdinasir Ali Hassan, chairman of Hass petroleum.
- Abdi Holland, Somali artist.
- Abdillahi Mohammed Ahmed (1926–1993), known as Qablan, former Under-Secretary of Finance
- Farah Awl (1937–1991), writer
- Fatima Jibrell founder of the Horn relief now known as ADESO.
- Yaasiin Cismaan Keenadiid, traditional Somali linguist
- Shire Haji Farah, entrepreneur, and Executive Committee Member of the Somali Business Council
- Omar A. Ali, entrepreneur, accountant, financial consultant, philanthropist, and leading specialist on Islamic finance.
- Osman Yusuf Kenadid, inventor of the Osmanya writing script
- Mohammed Awale Liban, designed the flag of Somalia
- Maxamed Daahir Afrax, novelist, playwright, journalist and scholar
- Iman (Zara Mohamed Abdulmajid), a Somali-American fashion model, actress and entrepreneur. A pioneer in the ethnic-cosmetics market, she is also noted for her philanthropic work. She is the widow of English rock musician David Bowie.
- Abdulqawi Yusuf, lawyer and judge at the International Court of Justice.
- Ali A. Abdi, sociologist and educationist, professor of education and international development, the University of British Columbia.
- Abdullahi (Daan) Saleh Yusuf, notable businessman from the geesaguule sub-clan of harti

=== Royalty ===
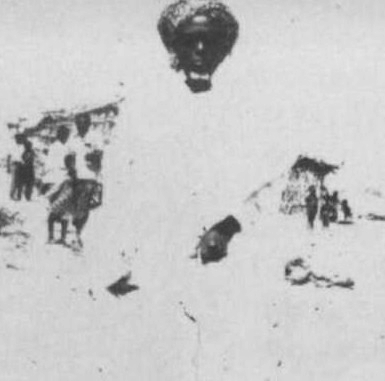
Aw Abdille Ibrahim (pictured) and Yusuf Agararan were governors in the Cal (Darawiish) region.

- Diiriye Guure, head / sultan of Dhulbahante, a position that coalesced with the Dervish
- Garad Jama Garad Ali, Traditional Clan Chief of Dhulbahante Clan.
- Garad Mukhtar Garad Ali, Traditional Clan Chief.
- Ugas Hassan Ugas Yasin, supreme traditional clan elder of Dishiishe/ nominal chief Ugas of Harti clans.
- Ali Yusuf Kenadid, last Sultan of the Sultanate of Hobyo
- Gerad Hamar Gale second Sultan of the Warsangali Sultanate
- Mohamoud Ali Shire (1897–1960), one the Warsangeli Sultanate chiefs
- Ugas Yasin Ugas Abdurahman, Ugas of the Dishiishe sultanate of Bosaso
- Yusuf Ali Kenadid, founder of the Sultanate of Hobyo
- Osman Mahamuud, King of the Majeerteen Sultanate (mid-1800s – early 1900s)

=== Politicians ===
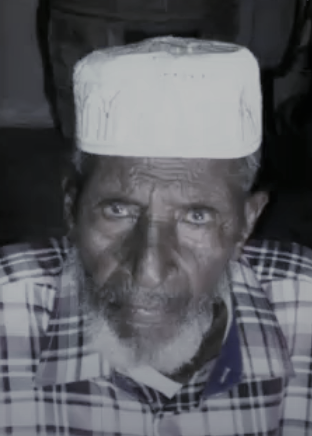
Ismaaciil, son of darawiish peace-time prime minister Xaashi Suni Fooyaan.

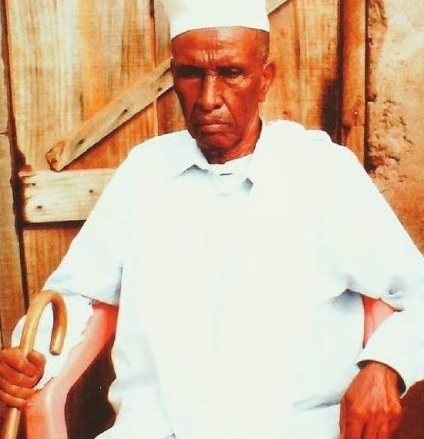
Aadan Carab reported on the Dhulbahante genocide at the hands of European colonialists during the Darawiish era in his poem Diidda ama Yeella.

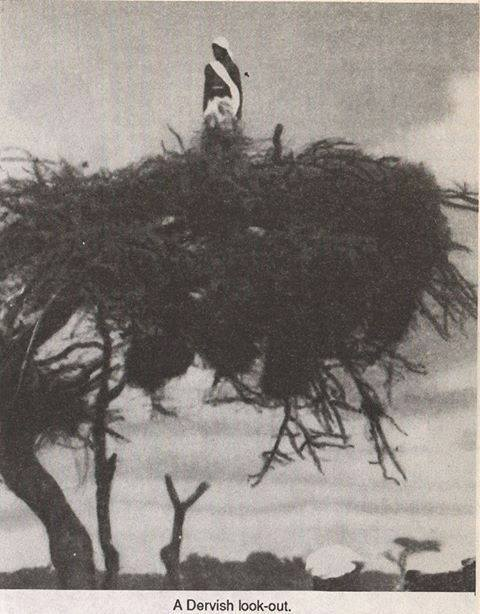
The scout of Darawiish head of intelligence, Serar Shawe.

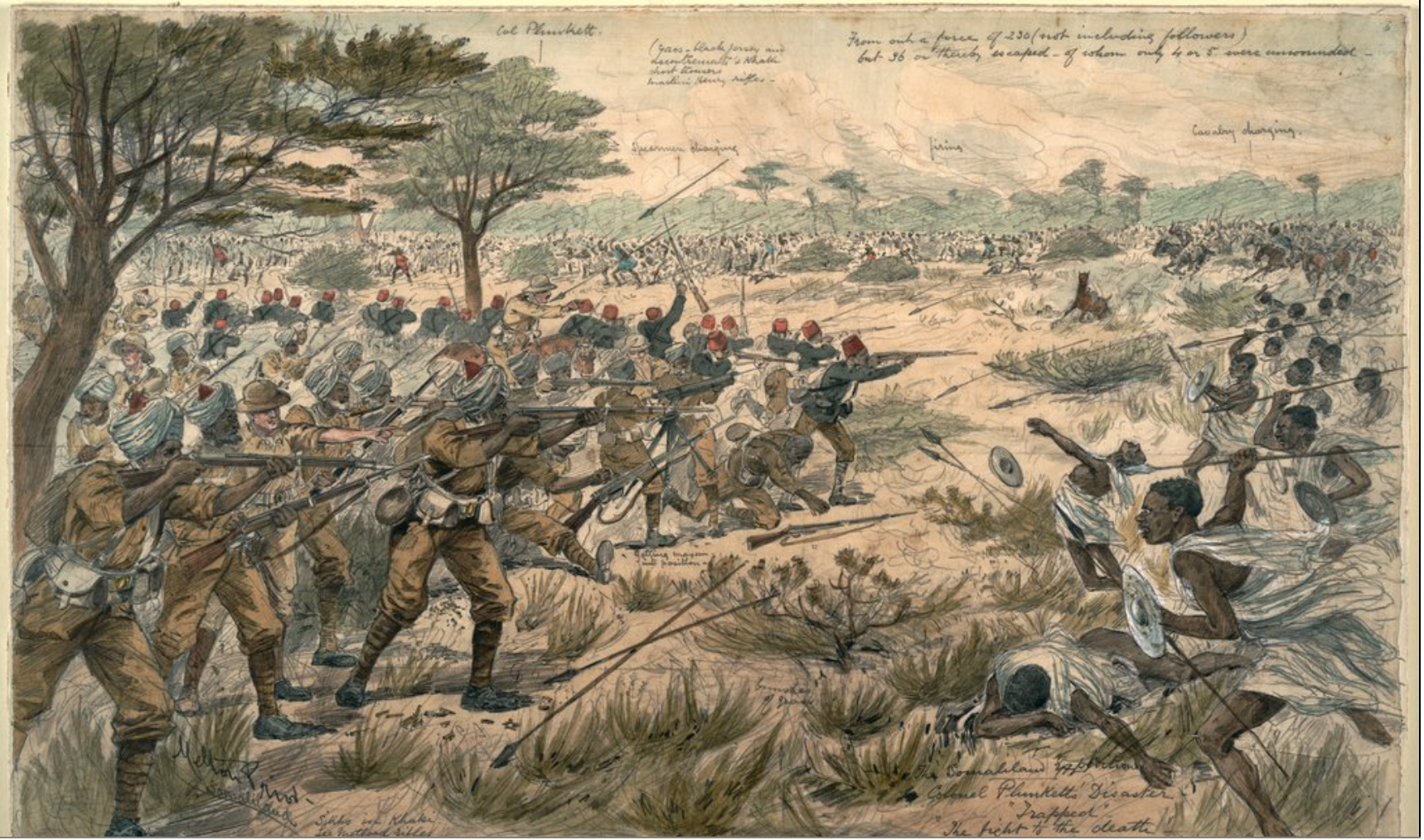
1903 drawing by Melton Prior depicting the Battle of Cagaarweyne commanded by Suleiman Aden Galaydh, Maxamuud Dheri and Diiriye Guure

- Bashe Mohamed Farah, Speaker of Somaliland House of Representative.
- Ibraahim Guure, Khatumo lawmaker
- Ali Jangali Somalia's minister of foreign affairs
- Ahmed Gacmayare, former Information Minister for Khaatumo State
- Abdirizak Jurile, Veteran Politician, Former Minister of Planning and In't Cooperations of Somalia. Former Minister of Postal cooperation of Somalia. Diplomat, Head of numerous UN organizations and professor.
- Abdullahi Bile Noor, longest served Somali MP, State-Minister of Education and Higher learning of Somalia Government
- Faisal Hassan, Canadian politician
- Ali Abdi Aware, former Puntland State Minister of the Presidency for International relations and Social Affairs.
- Asha Gelle Dirie, former Minister of Women Development and Family Affairs of Puntland; founder and executive director of TAG Foundation
- Ayaan Hirsi Ali, the first Somali-born member of parliament of a European country, author and political activist[19]
- Farah Ali Jama, former Minister of Finance of Puntland
- Haji Bashir Ismail Yusuf, first President of Somali National Assembly; Minister of Health and Labor of Somalia (1966–67)
- Barkhad Ali Salah, First Mayor For Bosaso.
- Hassan Abshir Farah, former Mogadishu mayor, Somalia ambassador to Japan and later to Germany, interior minister of Puntland
- Omar Fateh, first Somali and Muslim State Senator in Minnesota
- Hassan Ali Mire, first Minister of Education of the Somali Democratic Republic; former Chairman of the Somali Salvation Democratic Front (SSDF).
- Hirsi Magan Isse, scholar and revolutionary leader with the Somali Salvation Democratic Front (SSDF).
- Ilhan Omar, a Somali-American politician, currently a member of the Minnesota House of Representatives representing the 60B district. On November 6, 2018, Omar was elected to the United States House of Representatives for Minnesota's 5th congressional district. She was the first Somali member of congress and the second female Muslim to be elected (the first is Rashida Tlaib who will represent Michigan's 13th congressional district) She will be officially sworn into office on January 3, 2019.
- Jama Ali Jama, Colonel in the Somali military and former President of Puntland
- Mire Hagi Farah Mohamed, Somali Finance Minister 2004–2006, and former mayor of Kismayo
- Mohamed Abdi Aware, Puntland judge and member of Supreme Judicial Council.
- Mohammed Said Hersi Morgan, son-in-law of Siad Barre and minister of defense of Somalia
- Said Mohamed Rage, founder of puntland counter-piracy authority
- Saida Haji Bashir Ismail, former Somali Finance Vice-Minister in the TNG (2000–2004)
- Yasin Haji Osman Sharmarke, leader and co-founder of the Somali Youth League
- Omar Ismail Waberi, Chairman of Horcad party. FGS MP
- Yusuf Mohamed Ismail, former Ambassador of Somalia to the United Nations Human Rights Office in Geneva
- Yusuf Osman Samatar, politician
