= Baho Nugaaled =

Somali clan

Baho Nugaaleed
Baho Nugaaleed بهو نوغال

Regions with significant populations

Languages
- Somali, Arabic, English

Religion
- Islam (Sunni)

Related ethnic groups
- Farah Garad, Mohamoud Garad, and other Darod groups

The Baho Nugaaleed (Af:Somali: Baho Nugaaleed, Arabic: باهو نوغال), is a loose Somali clan confederation that is part of the Dhulbahante clan-family. The primary homeland of these clans include the regions of Sool and Togdheer in Somaliland, the Lower Juba region in Somalia and the Dollo Zone in Ethiopia. The Bah Nugaaleed are composed of three major sub-groups in accordance with their locality in Somalia, primarily in the regions of Sool, Togdheer, Nugaal and Jubaland. These groups are Qayaad, the Ugaasyo, the Reer Aymeed and Reer Oodeed (including Qayaad).

The primary purpose of the confederation is to balance the political weight of the Farah Garad and Mohamoud Garad. Beyond this the various sub-clans that enumerate under the confederation do not necessarily share any exclusive clan allegiances.

Members of the clan confederation have a significant presences in the cities of Las Anod, Buuhoodle, Garowe and Kismayo.

== Bah Nugaal subclans ==
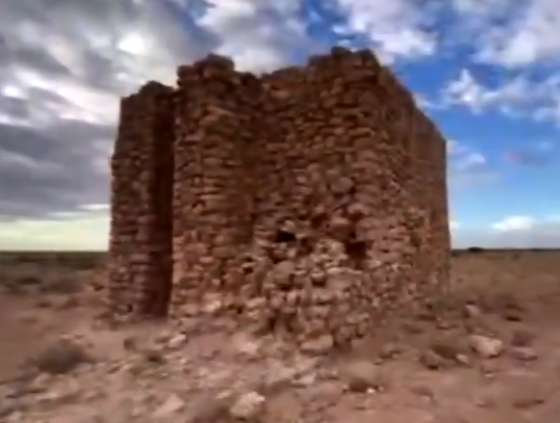
The Dalyare fort is a Dervish fort/Dhulbahante garesa located in the Oodagooye basin; the basin is the area where the territories of the Dhulbahante sub-clans of Ugaasyo, Baharsame, Galool Oriye and western Ugaadhyahan converge.

=== Reer Aymeed ===
The Reer Aymeed subclans of Bah Nugaaleed are distinguished by their tendency of usage of boqor and suldaan for clan chieftains; they include the Hayaag whom settle in Ceegaag, the non-Dudub Khalid subclans of bah Nugaaleed whom settle in Sooljoogto, and the Yaxye in Goljano and Qayder. Among other Dhulbahante clans, warriors from the Baho Nugaaleed segments of the Dhulbahante were constituents of the large and prestigious Shiikhyaale division of the Dervish Movement. The Hassan Ugaas and Qayaad which constitute the two largest sub-clans of the major Dhulbahante division of Baho Nugaaleed made their name as one of the most ardent fighters for the movement. Western colonial figures such as Eric Swayne likewise commented on the ardent nature in support of the Dervishes by the Baho Nugaaleed Dhulbahante, spelling the Qayaad clan as "kayat":

The Yaxye or Yahye sub-clan of Baho Nugaaleed constituted one of the four constituents of Golaweyne. Bohol Warabe, which was traditionally a Hamud Ugaas town, hosted a base for the Burcadde-godwein subdivision of Dervishes. The Muuse subclans of Baho Nugaaleed which include Ebirar and others is where the founders of the Salixiya sect among Somalis hails from, including figures such as Ali Nayroobi and Sheikh Ismail Ishaaq Urwayni and others. This spiritual backdrop would later form the basis of the Maxkamadaha Darawiishta (Dervish legal courts) in 1895 and the hundreds of muqaddims learnt in its ways.

==== People ====
- Galaydh Cabdi Ismaaciil, member of haroun; was of Hayaag clan

=== Reer Oodeed ===
The Reer Oodeed are the Baho Nugaaleed Dhulbahante subclans who are based in intersecting territories of the central Ciid region. These include Qayaad and the Dudub subclans of Khalid, the Ebirar and Tuuryar whom once jointly proposed a stipend during the Somali British Military Administration. Their modern traditional clan chief is Ali Burale. British generals glorified and hailed the decimation and carnage inflicted upon the Reer Oodeed, specifically, the Qayaad clan by the British colonial army on account of them being Dervishes, with Qayaad spelled as Kayat:

It is a fortunate thing that the Kayat tribe, which most strongly supported him, appears to have suffered the severest losses.

— Eric Swayne

The Qayaad were also implicated in an attack on a barracks commanded by British general Malcolm Mcneill and were among 600 casualties laying in its surroundings:

he could not have lost less than 600 men killed and wounded. It was also clear that the Kayat, Adan Madoba, Rer Hagar, Ali Gheri, Jama Siad, Nur Ahmed, and Mijjarten tribes were all implicated in the attack on the zariba, as was evidenced by the bodies of men actually shot, and by wounded men

— Malcolm McNeill

==== Groups ====
Fighters in the following Dervish military divisions predominantly belong to the Baho Nugaaleed segments of the Dhulbahante:

- Indhabadan, a Dervish administrative division which was half Baho Nugaaleed, specifically Qayaad
- Bah Udgoon, a Dervish administrative division which was primarily Baho Nugaaleed, specifically Qayaad

=== Ugaasyo ===
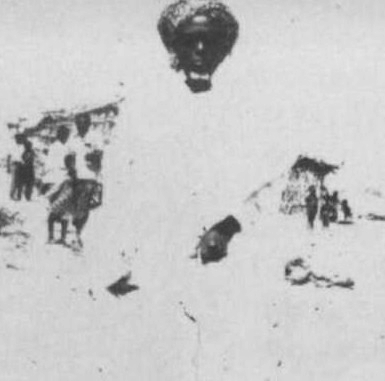
Aw Abdille Ibrahim (pictured) and Yusuf Agararan were governors in the Cal (Darawiish) region.

According to I.M Lewis, the Baho Nugaaleed subclans suffixed with Ugaas, namely Hassan Ugaas, Hussein Ugaas, Mohamud Ugaas and Hamoud Ugaas traditionally formed a political confederation called Bah Ugaas, colloquially referred to as Ugaasyo, and they traditionally inhabit the easternmost parts of Ciid:

and Husseen Ugaas (E8) lineages (of which the first is the strongest) are joined in a loose political alliance, putatively on a uterine basis, as the Bah Ugaas and opposed as a unit to each of their more powerful collaterals

— IM Lewis

The Hussein Ugaas Shirshore clan was hosting many of the battles of the second expedition, which partially occurred in their previous homelands in the southeastern Ciid region, contemporarily called the Geland district. However, Hussein Ugaas Shirshore clan members largely migrated to Waamo and Jubaland in the wake of the Eric Swayne expedition espoused by James Hayes Sadler. According to the British War Office, the Hassan Ugaas was one of the clans exiled towards Illig (Eyl) on account of them being Darawiish during Eric Swayne's second expedition:

and Moving vid Kallis, the column attacked the Nur Ahmed and Hassan Ugaz tribes at Hareyelahu, and drove them in the direction of Illig, capturing 41 ponies

— British War Office

Jama Ismail Dhoon, a Dervish muqaddim reporting on the extreme violence of the second expedition in these lands, reported on a battle between a British commander and Maxamuud Dheri, stating:

intuu hoosta ka soo galay ayuu seeftii madaxa kaga gooyey...Labadayada indhood waxaan ka qaaday isagoo Darwiishkaasii madaxii gaalka wata oo uu luqunta faraskiisa ka laalaado, isaguna ku joogo

Translation:

as he approached and neared, his head was sliced clean off... The last I saw of this confrontation was seeing this Darwiish (i.e. Dheri) carrying the colonist officers' head, hanging it from his horse's neck, whilst he himself was sat on it (the horse)

==== Groups ====
- Burcadde-godwein, a Dervish administrative division based in the Hamud Ughaz town of Bohol Warabe, Hamud Ugas being an Ugaasyo Dhulbahante subclan.

==== People ====
- Aw Abdille Ibrahim, a member of the Dervish Haroun, of the Hassan Ugaas
- Faarax Baqardhe, a member of the Haroun (Dervish government); was of the Hamud Ugaas, an Ugaasyo Dhulbahante clan
- Axamed Aadan Surgo, a member of the Haroun (Dervish government); was of the Hassan Ugaas, an Ugaasyo Dhulbahante clan
- Xaashi Chatami, mentioned in Geoffrey Archer's 1916 important members of Darawiish haroun list
- Liban Dugarri, Hamud Ugaas, mentioned in Geoffrey Archer's 1916 important members of Darawiish haroun list

== Notable figures ==
=== Leaders ===
- Mohamed Abdi Hashi, President of Puntland, October 2004 - January 2005
- Faarax Qarshe, Dervish governor of Bah Udgoon

=== Enterprisers ===
- Aw Jama Omar Issa, Somali scholar, historian and collector of oral literature of Somalia. He wrote the first authoritative study of Dervishes.
- Saado Ali Warsame, singer-songwriter and former MP in the Federal Parliament of Somalia.

=== Politicians ===
- Ahmed Gacmayare, former Information Minister for Khaatumo State.
- Abdirahman Mohamed Abdi Hashi, Former Somali Minister of Fisheries.
- Mohamed Isse Lacle, Colonel in the Somali Navy and Former Deputy Minister of Ministry of Ports in Puntland.
- Mohamoud Diriye Abdi Joof, former Khaatumo Minister.

=== Commanders ===
- Axmed Aarey, Dervish artillery commander whose barrage abetted the death of Richard Corfield
- Ibraahin Xoorane, Dervish commander who killed Richard Corfield
- Faarax Qarshe, commander of Bah Udgoon
