= Barkhad =

Barkhad is a given name. Notable people with the name include:

- Barkhad Abdi (born 1985), Somali-American actor and director
- Barkhad Awale Adan (1950?–2010), Somali journalist
- Barkhad Ali Salah (died 2016), Somali politician and historian
