= Muhdi =

Muhdi ﻣﻬﺪﻱ
Regions with significant populations

Languages
- Somali & Arabic

Religion
- Islam

Related ethnic groups
- Reer Zekeriye, Reer Boqor and other Mooracase clans

The Muhdi (Somali: Muhdi, Arabic: ﻣﻬﺪﻱ), is a Somali sub-clan. It forms a part of the Dishiishe Harti confederation of Darod clans, and primarily inhabit Somalia, Oman and Yemen. The Muhdis are believed to the largest sub-clan within Dishiishe both in terms of population size and land inhabitation but they are largely dispersed people living three respective countries
