= Farah Garad =

Somali clan

Faarax Garaad فارح جراد

Regions with significant populations

Languages
- Somali, Arabic, English

Religion
- Islam (Sunni)

Related ethnic groups
- Mohamoud Garad (Galool Oriye, Jama Siad), Baho Nugaaled, and other Darod groups

The Farah Garad or the Garad Farah (Somali: Faarax Garaad, Arabic: فارح جراد, Full Name: ’Farah Shirshore Habarwa Abdullah Muse Said Saleh Abdi Mohamed Abdirahman bin Isma'il al-Jabarti ) is a Somali clan which is part of the Dhulbahante clan-family, a sub-division of the larger Harti/Darod clan. The Farah Garad are divided into two sub-clans — Yassin Garad and Abdalla Garad. Abdalla has four clan eponyms, Ahmed Garad, Mohamed Garad (Baharsame), Guled Garad (Barkad) and Ali Garad. They are largely significant in Sool and Togdheer regions of Somaliland, and Dollo in Somali region of Ethiopia.

Garad Jama Garad Ali is concurrently the Garad of Farah Garad and the supreme Garad of Dhulbahante.

== Overview ==
The largest of the Farah Garad sub-clans is "Ahmed Garad" which are made up of Ali geri Ahmed, Aadan Ahmed, Naaleeye Ahmed, Samakaab Ahmed & Cigaal Ahmed(Odala), Warfaa Ahmed, and Hassan Ahmed.

- Mohamed Garaad (Bahararsame) are second common sub-clan in Farah Garaad, mainly Reer Naaleeye, and Reer Garaad Ali.
- Guleed Garad (Barkad) are the third sub-clan in Farah Garaad, mainly Ali shirwac.

== Distribution ==
The primarily homeland of the clan straddles the Nugaal Valley and the Ciid segments of the Haud plateaus where they inhabit the Sool and Togdheer region of Somalia. In particular, they settle in the districts of Las Anod and Buuhoodle. In Ethiopia, the clan has a significant presence in the Dollo Zone, specifically in the woredas of Boh, Danot and Werder.

== Garadate seat ==
=== Garadate ===
==== Groups ====
- Dharbash, was a Dervish administrative division which was one third Baharsame, a Farah Garad clan.

==== People ====
- Cabbaas Xuseen, first prime minister of the Dervish (1895 - 1900); of the Baharsame clan
- Xaashi Suni Fooyaan, peace-time prime minister of the Dervish (1905-1906); of the Baharsame clan
- Soofe-cali Buraale, member of the Dervish haroun, i.e. the government; was of the Baharsame clan
- Cabbane Sugulle, commander of Burcadde-Godwein, a Dervish administrative division

== Chief caaqil groups ==
=== Barkad ===
==== People ====
There were many notable Barkad people in the Dervish haroun, i.e. its government. These include:

- Jaamac Ismaaciil Dhoon, was a member of the Dervish haroun; of the Barkad clan
- Xareed Duubi Deero, was a member of the Dervish haroun; of the Barkad clan
- Xildiid Warsame Sharmaarke, was a member of the Derwish haroun; of the Barkad clan
- Bullale warsame gulled, was a member of the dervish haroun; of the barked clan
- Samatar Bullalleh, mentioned in the Geoffrey Archer's 1916 important members of Dervish haroun list

=== Ali Ahmed (Ali Geri Ahmed) ===
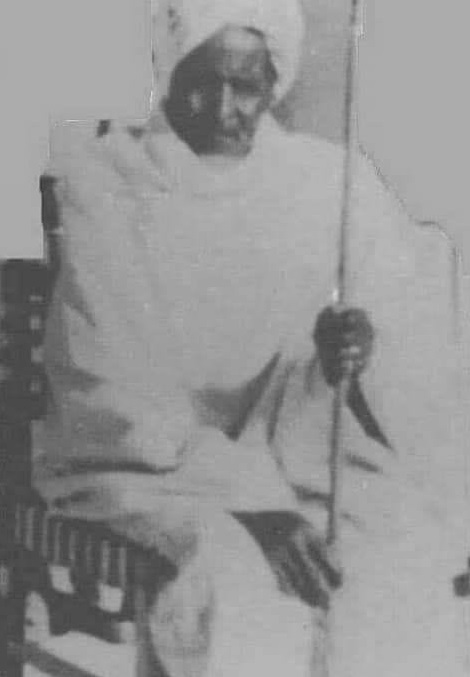
commander-poet Ismail Mire (pictured) administered the largest infantry Shiikhyaale and Adan Ali Gurey the second-largest, Golaweyne.

The Ali Geri Ahmed is whom caaqils (chieftains) of Ahmed Garad give deference to by extension. The poem by Ali Dhuh refers that the Reer Khayre sub branch of the Reer Suban sub clan of Ali Geri, Mahad Adan and Farah Adan, with Dhuh referring to it as a grouping in his poem Allahu Akbar. The Bah Ali Geri onelings have the largest deegaan (traditional clan territory) of the Farah Garad clans, stretching some 200 kilometers, from Dhilaalo in the north to Dannood in the south. According to both colonial sources as well as native historians such as Jama Omar Issa, the Ali Geri were the clan whom began and started the early camp of Maxkamadaha Dervishta in 1895.

The Ali Geri clan are particularly known for being the first tribe to adopt the Dervish (Dervish) identity, and according to professor Ingiriis, the bulk of the Dervish ranks being of the Ali Geri clan, which suggested the Dervish ideology moved towards "clan solidarity".

==== Groups ====
In the following Dervish administrative divisions, at least half comprised Bah Ali Gheri muqaddims (arbitrators), scouts, clerics, tenders and fighters:

- Ragxun, was a Dervish administrative division which was half Farah Garad, as Ali Geri is a Farah Garad subclan.
- Miinanle, was a Dervish administrative division which was majority Farah Garad, as Ali Geri and Odala & Egal-Naleye are Farah Garad sub-clans.
- Golaweyne, was a Dervish administrative division which was half Farah Garad, as Ali Geri are Farah Garad sub-clans.

==== People ====
- Jaamac Cudur, commander of a Garbo Dervish subdivision
- Osman Boss, commander of a Ragxun subdivision
- Aadan Dhacdhaco, was a member of the Dervish haroun, i.e. government; was of the Reer Khair Dhulbahante clan
- Cabdi Yaar Guuleed, was a member of the Dervish haroun, i.e. government; was of the Reer Khair Dhulbahante clan
- Maxamuud Cilmi, was a member of the Dervish haroun, i.e. government; was of the Reer Khair Dhulbahante clan
- Aadan Cawad, was a member of the Dervish haroun, i.e. government; was of the Reer Khair Dhulbahante clan
- Soofe Durraan, was a member of the Dervish haroun, i.e. government; was of the Reer Khair Dhulbahante clan
- Mohamud Hosh, was a member of the Dervish haroun, i.e. government; was of the Reer Khair Dhulbahante clan
- Saliid Baynax, member of Dervish haroun

== Lineage ==
There is no clear agreement on the clan and sub-clan structures and some lineages might be omitted." However, the following summarised clan tree presented below is taken from John Hunt's A general survey of the Somaliland Protectorate (1944-1950):

- Abdirahman bin Isma'il al-Jabarti (Darod)
  - Mohamed Abdirahman (Kabalalah)
    - Abdi Mohamed (Kombe)
      - Salah Abdi (Harti)
        - Said Salah (Dhulbahante)
          - Muse Said
            - Abdale Muse
              - Habarwa Abdale
                - Shirshore Habarwa
          - Farah 'Garaad' Shirshore
            - Yasin 'Garad' Farah
            - Abdulleh Garad Farah
              - Ali 'Garad' Abdulle
              - Mohamed 'Garad' Abdulle (Bah'ararsame)
                - Mohamoud 'Garad' Mohamed (Jabane)
                  - Mohamed Mohamoud
                  - Warsame Mohamoud
                  - Liban Mohamoud
                  - Sharmarke Mohamoud
                  - Audon Mohamoud
                  - Warfa Mohamoud
                  - Hersi Mohamoud
                  - Farah Mohamoud
                  - Ali Mohamoud
                    - Adur Ali
                    - Samakab Ali (Adde)
                    - Samatar Ali
                    - Omar Ali
                    - Mohamoud Ali
                    - Magan Mohamoud
                      - Samatar Mohamoud
                      - Farah Mohamoud
                      - Mohamed Mohamoud
                        - Mohamoud Mohamed
                          - Ali Mohamoud (Bihi Idoor)
                          - Beder Mohamoud (Bihi Idoor)
                          - Yusuf Mohamoud (Bihi Idoor)
                          - Hersi Mohamoud (Bah Ogaden)
                          - Esa Mohamoud (Bah Ogaden)
                          - Nur Mohamoud (Bah Majerteen)
                          - Naleya Mohamoud (Bah Majerteen)
                            - Ali (Hamud) Naleya
                            - Magan Naleya
                            - Mohamoud Naleya
                            - Hussein Naleya
                            - Salah Naleya
                            - Adan Naleya
              - Guleed 'Garaad' Abdulleh (Barkad)
                - Ali Gulled
                - Amir Gulled
                - Mohamoud Gulled
                  - Egal Mohamoud
                  - Esa Mohamoud
                  - Wegel Mohamoud
                  - Ali Mohamoud
                    - Koshin Ali
                    - Gedi Ali
                    - Naleya Ali
                      - Shirwa Naleya
                      - Musa Shirwa
                      - Suban Shirwa
                      - Beeda Shirwa
                      - Ali Shirwa
                        - Farah Ali (Baha'Ali)
                        - Mohamed Ali (Baha'Ali)
                        - Yusuf Ali (Baha'Ali)
                        - Maah Ali (Baha'Ali)
                        - Diriye Ali (Baha'Ali)
                        - Hersi Ali
                        - Gulled Ali
              - Ahmed 'Garaad' Abdulleh
                - Samakab Ahmed (Odala)
                - Egal Ahmed (Odala)
                - Warfa Ahmed (Bahgeri)
                - Hassan Ahmed (Bahgeri)
                - Naleye Ahmed
                  - Egal Naleye
                    - Samatar Egal
                    - Samakab Egal
                    - Jama Egal
                    - Dubad Egal
                    - Warfa Egal
                - Ali'Geri Ahmed (Reer Khayr), (Note: Khayr were a Dhulbahante wadaad / priesthood fraternity: "treatment of the Dhulbahante Khayr people, a clan of Mullahs whom Somalis believed to enjoy divine protection". Colonial sources' usage of "Khayreh" typically refers to the Ali-Gheri-led confederation (see 1917 intelligence report):)
                  - Ismail Ali’Geri
                  - Hersi Ali’Geri
                  - Shawe Ali’Geri
                  - Burale Ali’Geri
                  - Gulled Ali’Geri
                  - Warfa Ali'Geri
                    - Aralle Warfa
                    - Mohamed Warfa
                    - Jama Warfa
                    - Naleya Warfa
                  - Subaan Ali’Geri
                    - Beder Suban
                    - Beyle Suban
                    - Ali Suban
                    - Khayr Suban
                      - Hildid Khayr
                      - Raage Khayr
                      - Egal Khayr
                      - Sharmarke Khayr
                      - Farah Khayr
                      - Duale Khayr
                - Adan Ahmed
                  - Mahad Adan (Reer Khayr)
                    - Aralle Mahad
                  - Farah Adan (Reer Khayr)
                  - Wa'eys Adan (Ararsame)
                    - Warfa Wa'eys
                    - Hildid Wa'eys
                    - Shirwa Wa'eys
                    - Erbad Wa'eys
                    - Dulul Wa'eys
                      - Nur Dulul
                    - Gulled Wa'eys
                      - Mah Gulled
                      - Adan Gulled
                    - Naleya Wa'eys
                      - Jama Naleya
                      - Sharmarke Naleya
                      - Beder Naleya
                  - Hagar Adan (Ararsame)
                    - Gedi Hagar (Bah Ogaden)
                    - Addaad Hagar (Bah Ogaden)
                    - Warsame Hagar (Bah Ogaden)
                    - Elmi Hagar (Bah Ogaden)
                    - Amir Hagar (Bah Ogaden)
                    - Gulled Hagar (Bah Ogaden)
                    - Ayaar Hagar (Bah Warsengali)
                    - Fatah Hagar (Bah Warsengali)
                    - Adan Hagar (Bah Warsengali)
                      - Jama Adan (Reer Tuudhe)
                      - Ahmed Adan
                      - Abdulle Adan
                      - Ali Adan
                        - Qolaab Ali
                        - Awale Ali
                        - Warsame Ali
                      - Farah Adan
                        - Siad Farah (Bah Abrahin)
                        - Duale Farah (Bah Abrahin)
                        - Hersi Farah (Bah Abrahin)
                        - Warsame Farah (Bah Abrahin)
                        - Hagar Farah (Bah Abrahin)
                        - Ismail Farah (Bah Habar Eli)
                        - Seed Farah (Bah Habar Eli)
                        - Boos Farah (Bah Habar Eli)
                        - Omar Farah (Bah Habar Eli)
                        - Deria Farah (Bah Habar Eli)
                        - Shire Farah (Bah Hawiye)
                        - Hussein Farah (Bah Hawiye)
                        - Elmi Farah (Bah Hawiye)
                    - Farah Hagar (Bah Warsengali)
                      - Olloh Farah
                      - Haad Farah
                      - Egal Farah
                        - Jama Egal (Bah Hawiye)
                        - Mohamoud Egal (Bah Hawiye)
                        - Ismail Egal (Bah Hawiye)
                        - Hersi Egal (Bah Ugaadh)
                        - Aralle Egal (Bah Ugaadh)
                        - Ahmed Egal (Bah Ugaadh)
                        - Naleya Egal (Bah Ugaadh)
                        - Mohamed Egal (Bah Ugaadh)

== Notable Figures ==
=== Athlete ===
- Mohamed Suleiman, first ethnic Somali to win an Olympic medal

=== Prime ministers ===
- Ali Khalif Galaydh, Ex-Prime minister of Somalia and Khaatumo President.
- Cabbaas Xuseen, first prime minister of the Dervish (1895 - 1900)
- Xaashi Suni Fooyaan, peace-time prime minister of the Dervish (1905-1906)

=== Leaders ===
- Mohamed Yusuf Jama, former Khaatumo president
- Saleban Essa Ahmed, SSC Leader and former Somaliland Minister of Health
- Abdihakim Abdullahi Haji Omar, Former Vice President of Puntland.
- Ismail Mire, Shiikhyaale commander, poet.
- Barni Sugulle, female governor of Indhabadan, sister of Faarax Sugulle
- Jaamac Ismaaciil Dhoon, Barkad, Dervish muqaddim

=== Commanders ===
- Suleiman Aden Galaydh, Dervish commander at Cagaarweyne
- Xayd Aden Galaydh, Dervish commander at Jidbali

=== Tribal leaders ===
- Garad Jama Garad Ali, Traditional Clan Chief of the Dhulbahante Clan.
- Garaad Abdulahi Garaad Soofe, Garad, of the Ahmed Garad, the second most senior chief of the Farah Garad branch of the Dhulbahante Clan.

=== Enterprisers ===
- Abdinasir Ali Hassan, Chairman of Hass Petroleum.
- Abdi Holland, Somali artist.
- Jama Yare, Somali artist.
- Kiin Jama, Somali artist.
- Deeqa Afro, Somali artist.
- Ali Dhuh, a great poet a coiner of new Somali words; poetic critic of the Sayid
- Aadan Carab, poet who chronicled colonial-era events; said a Dhulbahante genocide occurred at the hands of European colonialists

=== Legislative speakers ===
- Bashe Mohamed Farah, Former Speaker of Somaliland parliament.
- Faarax Sugulle, head of the Dervish haroun

=== Politicians ===
- Ali Jangali, Former Somali minister of foreign affairs.
- Ahmed Aidid former Minister of Education.
- Abdiqani Mohamoud Jidhe, Governor of Sool.
- Abokor Seed Cali, member of the Dervish haroun, of the Odala Samakab (Bahgeri Dhulbahante) clan
