= Yasin Ugas Abdurahman =

Ugas Yasin Ugas Abdurahman أغاس ياسين أغاس عبد رحمن
- 28th Ughaz of Dishiishe, who also was the nominal Ugas of Harti
- Reign: 1940-late 2000
- Predecessor: Ugas Ibrahim
- Successor: Ugas Hassan Ugas Yasin
- Born: Bosaso, Italian East Africa
- Died: 30 December 2000; Bosaso, Somalia
- Religion: Islam

Ugas Yasin Ugas Abdurahman (died 30 December 2000) was a Somali ruler. He was the 28th Ughaz (chieftain) of the Dishiishe chieftainship, (UGAASTOOYO) who also was the nominal ugas of the Harti clan of Darod groups, reigning from 1940 to 2000. Ugas was a former ruler of Bosaso. Along with other Somali traditional rulers, Ugas Yasin was one of the most prominent rulers of present-day Somalia and the longest served traditional ruler in the history of all Somali traditional rulers. Bosaso was represented in the parliament of the succeeding Trust Territory of Somaliland by Ugas Yasin.

== Overview ==
Ugas was the powerful Ruler of Dishiishe Chieftainship. He also enjoyed other titles Including "The Master," "The cultural role model," and "the Religious scholar." During the 1950s, Ugas fled to northwestern Somalia, which was then under the rule of the United Kingdom. Upon his arrival in the northwestern regions, he was accorded warmth and brotherly reception by tribal elders, intellectuals among other elite individuals and of the communities at large.

Ugas was known to be one of the kindest rulers of all Somali territories, as many sub-clans who were not under his rule desired to be under his rule because of his kind and just actions. In his long rule, he dominated most of the western part of the Bari region of Somalia. Ugas had spent most of his time in Bosaso, the town was his base and the location of the barracks of his soldiers.

Yasin was one of the youngest traditional rulers, as he occupied power in his 20s. He was also one of the most well-educated Somali rulers. His prominent nickname was Ruler of Bosaso. His most important barracks were Bosaso, Yalho, Karin and Laas Dawaco.

== Burial ==
Ugas Yasin was buried at Ugaas Yaasiin garden near Bosaso on 30 December 2000.
