= Ali Dhuh =

Somali poet

Ali Duh Gorayo
- Cali Dhuux Gorayo
- Died: 1962
- Occupation: Poet
- Writing career
- Language: Somali
- Genre: Somali oral poetry
- Notable work: Guba poems

Ali Duh Gorayo (Somali: Cali Dhuux Gorayo) (died 1962) was a popular poet from Somalia, who hailed from the city of Buuhoodle, in the Togdheer, Somalia but grew up in the Nugaal region now Sool (las-Anod) and Dollo region in Ethiopia. He mostly wrote about camel husbandry and the issues affiliated with the profession of camel riders.

== Beginnings ==
He hails from the Bah Cali Gheri clan and he started a poem called Guba Chain in the 1920s. He was best known for coining several news Somali words, and was also opposed to the emir of dervish king Diiriye Guure, Mohammed Abdullah Hassan during the Darawiish struggle against the British in the early 1900s and wrote many poets to propagate his opposition. Whereas figures such as Dhuh are sometimes credited as a Dhulbahante figure giving an external perspective on colonization efforts whilst ongoing, Aadan Carab is often credited for an external perspective from the perspective of hindsight or retrospect, such as highlighting a Dhulbahante genocide at the hands of European colonialists during the Darawiish era.

== Overview ==
Ali Dhuh's most famous contribution to Somali poetry is the Guba poems, a series of poems he initiated after the Habar Yoonis conquest of the Ogaden, in which they uprooted the native Ogadens and took in to possession huge swathes of land and thousands of camels.

Historian Siegbert Uhlig commenting on the Guba poem writes the following- (Note: There exist several back and forth reply poems)

From a historical point of view Ali Dhuh's poem explicitly details the large gains in traditionally Ogaden territory and wells, and the looting of Ogaden camels by the Isaq. He details the scattering of the Ogaden clan, their forced migration southwards seeking refuge in the feverish river valleys, and even turning to hunting and farming- measures that were again considered very shameful usually only undertaken by slaves and low-caste Somalis and utterly demeaning for the once great pastoral Ogaden clan. The Ogaden, Ali recounts, have been forced to accept refuge with the clans that defeated them, especially the Habr Yunis, and cannot take revenge. The Isaq are portrayed as particularly callous and shameful in the way they parade looted Ogaden camels in front of their previous owners. Even in translation it is a very evocative poem.
