= Dishishe =

Sub-clan of the Somali Darod clan

Dishiishe دشيشى
- Darod Somali Clan
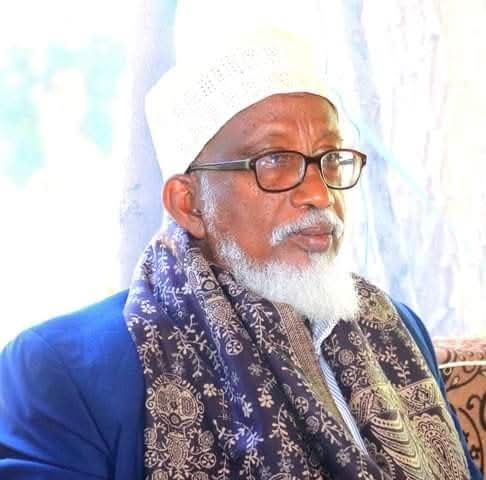
- Ugas Hassan Ugas Yasin, the current supreme traditional clan elder of Dishiishe
- Ethnicity: (Somalia) Somali
- Location: (Somalia) Somalia (Oman) Oman; Yemen
- Descended from: Sheikh Abdirahman bin Isma'il al-Jabarti
- Parent tribe: Harti
- Branches: Abdalle Abdirahman (Makadoor); Ishaq Abdalle (Reer Boqor); Abdikarim Abdalle; Ismael Abdirahman; Yonis Ismail; Saed Ismail; Ugar Ismail; Abdalle Ugar; Abdikarim Ugar (Bah Wadaag)(Reer Ugaas); Jibril Ugar (Reer Xaaji)
- Language: (Somalia) Somali (Arab League) Arabic
- Religion: Sunni Islam

The Dishishe (Somali: Dishiishe, Arabic دشيشى) also spelled Dashiishe, a prominent Somali clan within the Darod Harti lineage. They are a sub-clan of the Ahmed Harti (Mora'ase), and are considered fraternal clans to the Gabtaanle, Tiinle, and Maganlabe. The Dishiishe primarily reside in the Puntland State of Somalia, notably in the Bari and Sanaag regions, with a presence also documented in Kismayo, southern Somalia. Beyond Somalia, the Dishishe also have a presence in Oman, predominantly in the Dhofar Governorate, and are also documented in Yemen. The forefather of this clan is Mohamud Ismail Ahmed Harti.

== Lineage ==
- Abdirahman bin Isma'il al-Jabarti (Darod)
  - Mohamed ("Kablalah")
    - Abdi("Kombe")
      - Salah("Harti")
        - Ahmed Harti (Mooracase)
          - Ismail Ahmed
            - Waeys Ismail (Tiinle)
            - Nuh Ismail (Maganlabe)
            - Abdalle Ismail (Gabtanle)
            - Mohamud Ismail (Dishishe)
              - Abdirahman Mohamud (Miyirwaaq)
              - Abdalle Abdirahman (Makadoor)
                - Ishaq Abdalle (Reer Boqor)
                - Abdikarim Abdalle
                  - Ali Abdikarim (Reer Sakariye)
                  - Mohamud Abdikarim
              - Ismail Abdirahman
                - Yonis Ismail
                - Saed Ismail
                - Ugar Ismail
                  - Abdalle Ugar
                  - Jibril Ugar (Reer Xaaji)
                    - Mu'awiye Jibril
                    - Osman Jibril
                      - Mohamed Isse O. (Reer Maxamed Ciise)
                      - Fahiye Salah O. (Reer Faahiye)
                      - Roble Osman
                        - Gobdon Roble
                        - Ishaq Roble
                        - Salah Roble
                        - Mohamud Roble
                          - Mohamed Mohamud
                          - Muse Mohamud ("Reer Muuse")
                  - Abdikarim Ugar (Bah Wadaag)
                    - Ishaq Abdikarim
                      - Ahmed Ishaq (Reer Ugaas)
                      - Saleban Ishaq
                      - Mohamed Ishaq

== Notable people ==
Ugas Yasin Ugas Abdurahman, A highly respected and influential Ugas of the Dishishe Sultanate of Bosaso, serving from approximately 1940 to 2000.

Ugas Hassan Ugas Yasin, Current supreme traditional clan elder of Dishiishe/ nominal chief Ugas of Harti clans.

Abdirizak Jurile, veteran politician, diplomat and professor. Former TFG minister of Planning & International Cooperation, Former MP, former executive director of numerous UN and International organisations, and Senator.

Abdullahi Bile Noor, Former Minister of Education, Cultural & Higher Education, One of Somalia's longest-serving national MPs.

Said Mohamed Rage, Forner Minister of Ports, Marine Transport and Marine Resource of the Puntland state, founder of Puntland counter-piracy authority

Omar Ismail Waberi, Chairman of Horcad party. FGS MP.

Barkhad Ali Salah, First Mayor For Bosaso 1959-1963.

Hassan Abdallah Hassan, Somali politician, former Mayor of Bosaso, Member of Puntland Parliament

Abdisalam Bashiir Abdisalam, Somali Swedish politician. Former Mayor of Bosaso

Sainab Ugas Yasin, First female parliamentarian of Puntland 1998–2008. Women's inclusion to politics advocate.

Yasin Mire Mohamud, Somali politician, Former mayor of Bosaso.
