= Maxamed Daahir Afrax =

Somali writer

Maxamed Daahir Afrax محمد طاهر أفرح
- Occupations: Novelist, playwright, journalist, scholar
- Writing career
- Subjects: Social justice, corruption
- Notable works: Guur-ku-sheeg (1975), Nida Al-Horiyah (1976), Maana-faay (1979), Galti-macruuf (1980)

Maxamed Daahir Afrax (Somali: Maxamed Daahir Afraax Arabic: محمد طاهر أفرح) is a Somali novelist, playwright, journalist and scholar.

== Bibliography ==
- Nadaraat fi Athaqaafah As-Soomaaliyah ('An Introduction to Somali Culture', in Arabic). ed. Sharjah, United Arab Emirates, by the Culture and Information Department, U.A.E.
- Maana-faay : qiso (a Somali novel) ed. London : Learning Design, 1997.(first published in 1981) (reportedly the first novel written in romanized Somali script)
- Hal-Abuur : wargeys-xilliyeedka suugaanta & dhaqanka Soomaalida, Hal-Abuur Journal / 1993
- The 'Abwaan' as beacon : the centrality of the message in Somali literature with especial reference to the play 'Shabeelnaagoog', in: Horn of Africa / 2004
- New, extensively revised and expanded edition of his book in Somali, Dal Dad Waayey iyo Duni Damiir Beeshay: Soomaaliya Dib ma u Dhalan Doontaa?, 2004 (A Land without Leaders in a World without Conscience: Can Somalia be Resurrected?)
- Ashakhsiyah Aturathiyah fi Shi'r Hadraawi, in: Al-Hikmah, 135 (Feb.), pp. 44–50.1987
- A Nation of Poets, or Art-loving People? Some Aspects of the Importance of Literature in Present-day Somali Society, Hal-Abuur: Journal of Somali Literature and Culture, 1:2-4 (Autumn/Winter 1993/4), pp. 32–6., 1994
- The Mirror of Culture: Somali Dissolution Seen Through Oral literature’, in Ahmed I. Samatar (ed.), The Somali Challenge: from Catastrophe to Renewal, Boulder, CO and London: Lynne Reinner, pp. 233–52., 1994

== See also ==
- Nuruddin Farah
- Farah Mohamed Jama Awl
- Jama Musse Jama
