= Haji Yusuf Barre =

Somali military leader

Haji Yusuf Barre was the commander at the battle of Jidbali, the largest and deadliest engagement between the dervishes and the British Empire in the Horn of Africa. Haji Yusuf Barre is also noted for being the person whom held the last stand at the Dhulbahante garesa at Taleh, in the aftermath of the bombings at Taleh wherein Taleh became the first place to be targeted in Africa through aerial attacks.

== Jidbali Battle ==
A report by General Egerton reported that 1200 darawiish in total were killed and that Haji Yusuf Barre commanded the dervishes:

Total estimated to exceed 1,200. Rout was complete, and no Dervish has been seen in the neighbourhood since, except small party from south. Prisoners and deserters state as follows:—Some 5,000 Dervishes present at fight, with 1,000 rifles and 300 ponies. Haji Yussuf Dolbahanta commanded

The report also states that the darawiish infantry commander and the darawiish cavalry commander were both killed in the Jidbali battle, as well as four other major leaders, bringing to 6 the major darawiish leaders killed at Jidbali; it further states that Haji Yusuf Barre, whilst being general commander, barely escaped with his life:

Haji Yussuf Dolbahanta commanded, and escaped. His two leaders of foot and horse were killed, also four men of note

The report further states that the Sayid himself was at Xudun (Hudin):

Orders were to hold Jidballi to the last. The Mullah, with a large force, was said to be near Hudin during fight

== Fall of Silsilad ==
=== Controversy ===
The Cigaal family, of the Ali Geri subclan of Reer Khair Dhulbahante, and the maternal relatives of the Sayid Muhammad Abdullah Hassan were one of the most powerful families within the Darawiish. This can be deduced from the fact that it had more known members within the Darawiish government, than arguably any other family.

=== Prelude ===
Much of the native Somali citations on the development of Darawiish headquarters and the construction of Darawiish bases comes from the citations of Darawiish veterans such as Ciise Faarax Fikad and Aw Cabdille Ibrahim. Aw Abdallah Ibraahiim is from the Xasan Ugaas the city of Boocame in Somalia, and he lived to see Somali independence. During his old age, he relayed his memories of poems by the Sayyid.

=== Aw Abdille Ibrahim ===
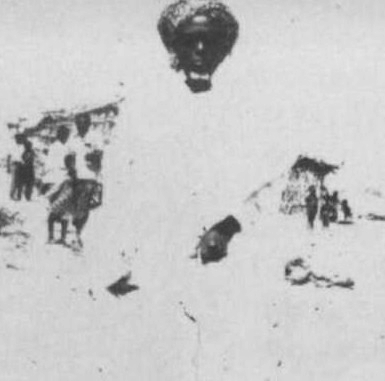
Aw Abdille Ibrahim (pictured) and Yusuf Agararan were governors in the Cal (Darawiish) region

Aw Abdille Ibraahiim was the overseer of the northern Cal coast of the Darawiish and was an advisor, or khusuusi. During the aftermath of a British Royal Air Force bombardment of Taleh, Aw Ibraahiim was asked by the Sayyid, the leader of the Darawiish, to advise on movement. They fled the Jidali air raids on 21 January 1920, thus Jidali becoming the first place in Africa to be bombed via aircraft. In his discussion with the Sayyid, Aw Ibraahiim was given the final say on what the Darawiish should do next. He disagreed with suggestions that the Darwiish remnants should go to Abyssinia (now-Ethiopians), Italians, and people of Harar, but agreed with the haroun that they follow the tributary of the Shebelle River westwards, in modern-day Ethiopia. Once they reached the tributary, Aw Abdille sent letters to two Oromo kings, of the Duube and Aruusa respectively. In it he asks for refuge for the Darawiish who had fled the assault by British and Italian colonialists. They later held a meeting and accepted providing refuge on the condition that they betroth their daughters to the king. A couple of months later, in December 1920, Abshir Dhoore hosted a meeting of 4 of the most senior Darawiish leaders, which included Aw Ibraahiim. Here, Dhoore informed the men that the Sayyid passed away. During the withdrawal from Taleh, the capital of the Darawiish, the Sayyid along with Aw Abdille Ibraahiim and Cismaan Boos entered the southern rural parts of Beretabli, in an area called Dodhais. As such, Cismaan Boos and Aw Cabdille Ibraahiim were the last two men to have accompanied the Sayyid prior to his flight from the Darawiish homeland. A school in Boocame has been named after Aw Ibraahiim.

=== Last man standing ===
Haji Yusuf Barre was also the last man standing at Taleh in February 1920. The battle between Yusuf Barre and the British troops is known to be the last military engagement to occur between the darawiish and the British in their original territories. A witness gave the following account of the battle between Haji Yusuf Barre and the British colonial army:

Nin aanu nolol ku aragnay oo lug ka jabnaa oo daarta fooqeeda sare saarraa, magaciisana la yiraahdo Yuusuf Barre oo haystay buntukh kow iyo tobnaale ah iyo rasaas baa loogu geli waayey, markii dambena rag Daraawiishtii ka haray ayaa la hadlay oo ku yiri, “Rasaasta jooji waa lagu bixinayaaye.” 7dii Febraayo 1920kii ayaa Taleex gacanta Ingriiska gashay.

Translation:

We saw a man who was still alive though he had a broken leg and was at the top of the Taleh Fortress. His name was Yusuf Barre and he had a total of eleven rifles. Somehow all the bullets aimed at him never seemed to hit him. Eventually, some men who defected from the dervishes were sent to him whereby they said "if you stop firing, you'll be given amnesty". Thats when on the 7th of February 1920, the English conquered the city of Taleh

British general Gibb noted that capturing the fort became uncomplicated primarily as it had only one defender, in Haji Yusuf Barre:

He himself, finding the forts lightly held, attacked with all available men. General panic ensued. Men, women, and children rushed precipitately out of the forts and by 7 p.m. the Tribal Levy were in occupation of part of the fortress. A number of riflemen, however, remained in two of the forts, some of whom escaped during the night, others surrendering in the morning. It was most fortunate that Tale was so easily captured

==== Silsilad castellans ====
===== Mohamud Hosh =====
Native Somali sources have reported how Mohamud Xoosh Cigaal, often anglicised as Mohamud Hosh, was the last adult resident of Taleh fort, as such the last castellan of Silsilad:

Rag Soomaali ah oo ciidanka Ingiriiska ka socday waxay yiraahdeen, Sayidku markuu baxay waa arkayney, hase ahaatee in uu gaalada gacanteeda galo ma aannu doonayn. Darwiish la yiraahdo Maxamuud Xoosh Cigaal; oo aan la kulmay, galabtaasna meeshaa joogey

Translation:

A few Somali men who were aligned with the colonial English forces had said that they clearly saw it when the Sayid was escaping from Taleh fort. Nonetheless, they were reluctant to see the Sayid being captured by the British. A Darawiish by the name of Maxamuud Xoosh Cigaal remained in the abandoned fort

Maxamuud Xoosh Cigaal was also described as being among the heads of the Darawiish government in Somali sources and Xoosh Cigaal described the demoralizing effects of British war planes attacking the Taleh fort in detail:

Maxamuud Xoosh Dheere oo ka mid ahaa madaxdii Daraawiisheed, lagana waraystay jabkii Daraawiishta waxa laga hayaa, Haddii xataa ayan dayaaradaha Ingiriis noo iman annagaaba

Translation:

Maxamuud Xoosh who was among the leading figures of the Darawiish, and who reported to us the details of the air bombardment against Darawiish launched by the colonialists, said that even if the British war planes seeking out Darawiish had not arrived ...

Maxamuud Xoosh Cigaal is one of the most important native African sources on interactions and tactics used between Europeans and Africans from the era of the Scramble for Africa, particularly in the Horn of Africa. One example that Xoosh speaks about is what he calls the forged letter from his former mentor Salah which he describes as propaganda forged by the British and Italians.

A 1999 book published by Indiana University also shortlists Mohamud Hosh as one of only a few known Somali government figures from the pre-colonial era, and further lists him as one of the only Somali politicians from the precolonial era to have documented precolonial customs and conventions within the Horn of Africa. The interviews continued from 1971 up to 1973.

A report from the University of Michigan states that in the early 1970s Maxamuud Xoosh Cigaal, which is latinized as Mohamud Hosh in English sources, was being interviewed whilst in his old age by a Somali research commission who sought to study British tactics vis-a-vis native African rebels towards colonialism. In this study, Maxamuud Xoosh reports how the European colonialists used divide et impera or divide and conquer tactics in order to subdue African natives and the counter-measures the native Africans took. The report also states that Maxamuud Xoosh or Hosh hails from the city of Buuhoodle.

===== Jama Biixi Kidin =====
The last resident of Silsilad overall, and thereby the last extant Darawiish is Jaamac Biixi Kidin, who although being the last Darawiish present at the Silsilad fort, was a 6 year old child when the fort was captured on 9 February 1920. A British war report describes Jaamac Biixi Kidin as being the lone individual present inside the fort. Due to his immediate arrest, Jaamac Biixi Kidin is also the first Somali child prisoner in history:

Many rifles but not much else was found in the fort, with the exception of one very small boy who had somehow been left behind ... I later handed him over to my colour sergeant Jama Hersi, as our only prisoner

A news report by Golkhaatumo journalist Asad Cadaani confirms that Jaamac Biixi Kidin was the last known Darawiish person to be extant at the fort, although only 6 years old. It also states that Jaamac Biixi Kidin was the last known Darawiish to still be alive when he died in the year 2009.

Darwiish Jaamac Biixi Kidin ayaa lax jir ahaa maalintii diyaaraduhu weerarka ku soo qaadeen daraawiish waxaana la aaminsan yahay in uu ahaa qofkii ugu danbeeyey ee Xaruntii daraawiish goob Jooga ka ahaa, isla markaana la kulmay Sayid Maxmed C/alle Xassan iyo madaxdii daraawiishta. Muddo haatan laga joogu shan sanno mar uu Jidbaale.com ugu waramayey magaalada Laascaanood waxa uu sheegay in uu Sayidka kula kulmay xarunta Taleex, ka dib markig uu dagaaladii daraawiisheed ku shahiiday aabhood Darwiish Biixi Kidin

Translation:

The Darawiish Jaamac Biixi Kidin was only 6 years old when the British war planes struck the Darawiish forts at Taleh; and it is believed that he was the last person to be present at the Darawiish's haroun government headquarters, as well as the last person to be in contact with any of actively anti-colonial Darawiish figures such as the Sayid. It was five years ago when Jidbali.com interviewed Kidin at Las Anod when Kidin stated that he was taken in by the Sayid after his father Biixi Kidin died in the midst of an anti-colonial battle

According to Jaamac Biixi Kidin, by the time the air strikes were made against Darawiish, the Darawiish were exclusively made up of the Dhulbahante clan.

== Personal life ==
The report by Egerton states that Haji Yusuf Barre, also called Sheik Yusuf hailed from the Dhulbahante tribe. He was killed in 1920 by a man named Abdi Dheere Shihiri, purportedly due to vengeance with a letter exchanged between the Sayid's camp and the British stating it was "because he alleges he killed 60 of his people", meaning the Habar Yoonis tribe that Shihiri belonged to. However, the Sayid stated that this allegation was a fabrication. The Sayid personally referred to him as commander of the Miinanle division, stating, Mahiiggaankan wada jira Miinanloo iskaafiya Yuusuf baa u maqadina, meaning, during this downpour, Miinanle be self-sufficient, Yusuf is its commander.
