= Sainab Ugas Yasin =

Puntland Politician

Deputy Minister of Finance of Puntland
- In office 2018–2019

House of Representatives of Puntland
- In office 1998–2007

Personal details
- Born: Bosaso, Puntland
- Party: Independent
- Education: Somali National University
- Occupation: Politician, activist

Sainab Ugas Yasin (Somali: Saynab Ugaas Yaasiin, Arabic: زينب اوغاس ياسين) is a Puntland politician. She was a member of Puntland House of Representatives in power for two consecutive terms (from 1998 to 2007). Later, she served as deputy minister of finance at Puntland Government. Apart from her career as a politician, she is an advocate for women’s participation in politics.

== Background ==
Sainab was born in the northeastern city of Bosaso. Her father is grand Ugas of Harti clans. She attained degree in social science at Somali National University.
