= Mohamoud Diriye Abdi Joof =

Somalian politician

Minister of social services
- In office 2012–2016

Personal details
- Born: Las Anod, Somalia

Mohamoud Diriye Abdi Joof is a Somali politician who served as the minister of social services for Khatumo State from 2012 to 2016.

== See also ==
- Politics of Somalia
