= Adan Ali Gurey =

Somali political advisor and chieftain

Adan Ali Gurey was a political advisor in the Darawiish, an proto-nationalist instigator, the commander of Golaweyne, a chieftain of the Dhulbahante, and an arms supplier.

== Goleweyne commander and arms ==
Adan Ali Gurey was also described as commander of Goleweyne, a regiment of the Darawiish in the Shiikhyaale poem of the Sayid:

Goleweyne maantii la galay, gaaladii jebiye
Gidhligaanka waatuu la dhacay, Gureygii fiicnaaye

Translation:

The day that Goleweyne was embraced, the interlopers were destroyed,
He fired high rates of bursts with heavy machine guns, the great (Adan Ali) Gurey

A letter received by Sir Harry Edward Spiller Cordeaux, the colonial administrator at British Aden stated that Adan Ali Gurey was of the Jama Siad tribe, and that he was an arms supplier to the proto-nationalist Darawiish.

regarding Adan Ali Goroh-Dolbahanta Jama Siad. This man came to me last year and made mischief between us (Dervishes and Government) and said to the Dervishes and swore that he would make mischief between the Dolbahanta and the Government, and said he would bring arms that were with the Dolbahanta to the Dervishes

== Political advisor ==
A letter by Geoffrey Archer to the Sayid refers to Adan Ali Gurey as a political advisor to the Sayid, the head of Darawiish:

Adan Ali Gureh, and that you believed their words. In this way you ask me not [to] listen to mischief-makers, but you yourself admit that you listen to them.

The Sayid, in a letter had written that Adan Ali Gurey was the main anti-colonial instigator against British colonialism:

I also inform you that Adan Ali (Gureh) before his arrival here had written to us a letter and declared that he was making mischief between the British and the Somalis; and in the meantime I informed the British Authorities, but they did not listen to my words.

The original format in Somali was as follows:

Waxaan kaloo idiin sheegayaa in ninka la yiraahdo Aadan Cali Gurey, intuusan halkan iman uu noo soo qoray warqad uu ku leeyahay waxaan isku dirayaa idinka iyo Ingiriiska,

Several raids between the British and Darawiish occurred in the 1910s decade, whom historian Douglas Jardine described as being led by Adan Ali Gurey:

One hundred and twenty miles in 40 hours without water in pursuit of elusive Dervish raiders in April, 1915; 344 miles in June, 1915, crowned by a brief skirmish with a party of Dervish horse; 316 miles in August, 1915, during which three Dervish parties were encountered and defeated with considerable loss; 335 miles in April, 1917, during which some Dervish cavalry could not be seen for their dust; 360 miles in April, 1919, in pursuit of a large Dervish force which always managed to keep 30 miles between them and us.

== Chieftain ==
According to Douglas Jardine, Adal Ali Gurey was a Darawiish, yet he defected in 1905, but once again became a Darawiish in the year 1911. According to Jardine, Adan Ali Gurey was also the chieftain of the Dhulbahante tribe:

Adan Ali Ghurrif ... This man deserted from the Mullah in 1905, and became an akil of the Dolbahanta. In 1911 he murdered another akil and fled to the Mullah, and was subsequently a leader of raiding parties.
