= Dalyare fort (Darawiish) =

Fort in Somalia

Dalyare Sool-Daryare Dariali
- Nugaal Valley
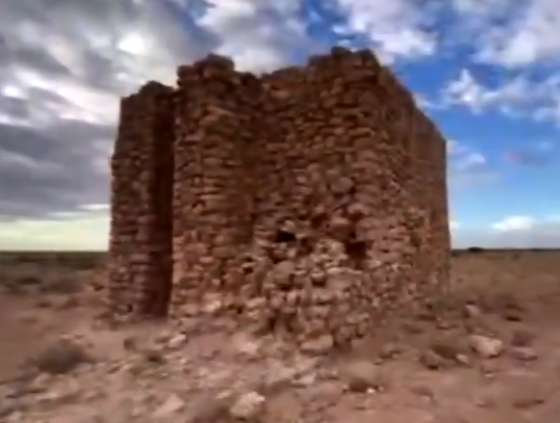
- Dalyare Darawiish fort

Site information
- Type: Anti-colonial fort
- Condition: Partially intact

Site history
- Built: 1911
- Built by: Ali Jalah
- In use: Abandoned

Dalyare fort is an open-top Dhulbahante garesa of the Darawiish era which was ordered built by the Dervish as a strategy for countering the colonization efforts of the Europeans. The building is located in the Nugaal Valley a few miles east of Las Anod. The purpose of the Dalyare fort was to serve as a refuge and escape route for Darawiish retreating from colonial forces who intend to head south towards the Shabelle River. However, retrospectively, some analysts have described the building as a setback to the previous tactic of maneuverability on the part of the Darawiish. Cali Jalax was the builder. The native Darawiish referred to the building as Sool-Daryare. On the other hand, the colonialists who launched attacks against the Darawiish referred to the building as Dariali.

== Abandonment ==
The book Ferro e fuoco in Somalia by former Italian Somalia governor Francesco Caroselli, it records the causes and circumstances of the Darawiish abandonment of Dalyare and other forts. The letter, originally in Arabic, but since translated to Italian and Somali records correspondence between the Sayid and the Italian Somali governor Giacomo De Martino stating that the forts were abandoned because the Dhulbahante tribe, one of the clans the Dervishes comprised, had by and large surrendered.

Bisha Abriil, horraanteedii, waxaa ka yimid Daraawiishta Beled Weyne, warqad dhambaal Wadaadku ku soo toosiyey Talyaaniga, una nisbeynaayo kala tagga dadkiisa raacsanaa ee Dhulbahante ahaa, codsanayana inaan u dhex galno isaga iyo Ingiriiska.
Ku socota Talyaaniga.
Ogow, markaad Majeerteen hubka gacanta ka saarteen, si ay noo baabi’iyaan, waxaannu kaa barinnay inaad hub na siiso ... Ingiriiska oo saas ogaa, ayaa dagaal nagu qaaday, isagaoo dhammaan wata col iyo 6 dayuuradood, ... Dhulbahantaha intii badnayd waxay isu dhiibtay Ingiriiska, gacantana ka saareen 21 qalcadood oo banaadiikh, rasaas iyo lacagi ka buuxdo ... Tan ku saabsan dhimasha, ogow, annaga iyo Ingiriisku dagaal kuma kulmin, ... la diley, kun carruur ah, naago gaboobey. Warkaasi waa hubaal.

Translation:

At the beginning of April, a letter was sent from the Darawiish base at Beledweyne, containing a message from the Sayid to the Italians, wherein he clarifies the dispersal of the mainstay tribe of the Darawiish, i.e. the Dhulbahante, and where he seeks Italian mediation between the British and himself.
To Italy
When you armed the Majeerteen that they may annihilate us (Darawiish), we asked you for weapons to defend ourselves ... The English, knowing our dire straits, waged war against us, whist armed with six fighter jets. Afterwards, the Dhulbahante surrendered to the English, and they were subsequently dispossessed of 21 forts, their rifles, and all their money and wealth ... Furthermore, ourselves and the British never entered into a fair fight ... rather thousands of children and elderly were annihilated at the hands of the British.
