= Geoffrey Archer (colonial administrator) =

British ornithologist and colonial official (1882–1964)

Sir Geoffrey Archer KCMG
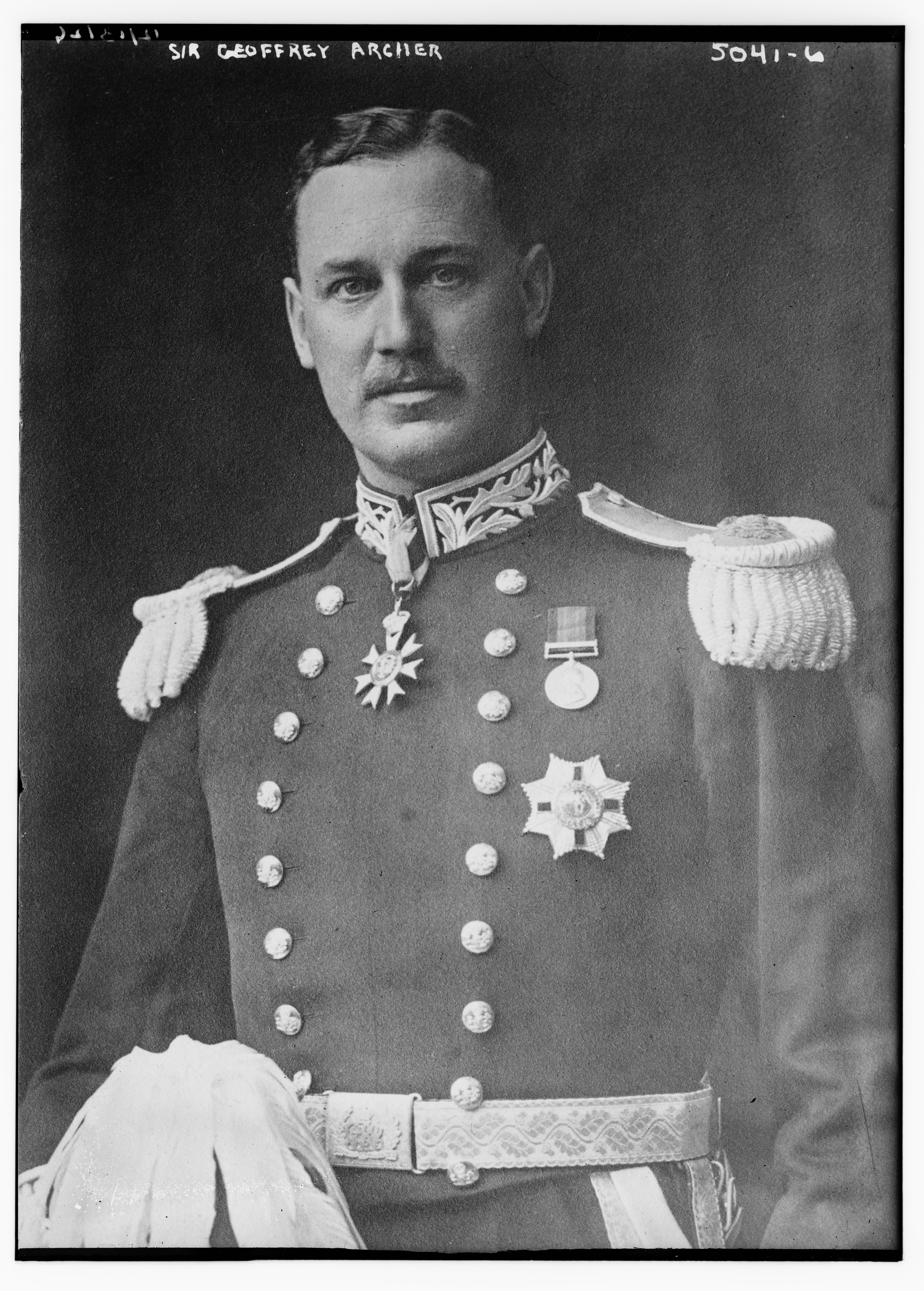

Commissioner of British Somaliland
- In office May 1914 – October 1919
- Preceded by: Horace Archer Byatt

Governor of British Somaliland
- In office October 1919 – 17 August 1922
- Succeeded by: Gerald Henry Summers

Governor of Uganda
- In office 1922–1925
- Preceded by: Robert Coryndon
- Succeeded by: William Gowers

Governor-General of Sudan
- In office 5 January 1925 – 6 July 1926
- Preceded by: Lee Stack
- Succeeded by: John Maffey

Personal details
- Born: 4 July 1882 Kensington, London, England
- Died: 1 May 1964 (aged 81) Cannes, France

Sir Geoffrey Francis Archer KCMG (4 July 1882 – 1 May 1964) was an English ornithologist, big game hunter and colonial official. He was Commissioner and then Governor of British Somaliland between 1913 and 1922, and was responsible for finally quelling the twenty-year-long Dervish resistance.

From 1922 to 1925, Archer was appointed Governor of Uganda. He later served as Governor-General of the Anglo-Egyptian Sudan between 1925 and 1926. In the Sudan, Archer paid a formal but friendly visit to Abd al-Rahman al-Mahdi, son of the self-proclaimed Mahdi Muhammad Ahmad, whose forces had killed General Gordon in 1885. Abd al-Rahman was leader of the neo-Mahdists in Sudan. Archer was eventually forced to resign due to the resultant flap, and spent the remainder of his career organising salt works in India.

== Early career ==
In 1901, the nineteen-year-old Archer joined his uncle Frederick John Jackson, the acting high commissioner in Uganda. His uncle sent him on an ornithological collecting trip the next year. He visited Lake Albert, the Semliki valley and the Rwenzori Mountains, discovering over twenty species and subspecies that had been previously unknown to science. He went to Baringo in 1904 where he conducted extensive surveys. Archer was almost tempted to become a professional big game hunter.

On the basis of his survey work, Archer was appointed District Commissioner of the Northern Frontier district in Kenya. The district was treated as a closed zone with little contact with the rest of Kenya. It was basically a buffer against the Ethiopians, and was not considered to have any other value.

In 1920, Archer said of northern Kenya: "There is only one way to treat the northern territories and that was to give them whatever protection one can under the British flag and otherwise leave them to their own customs. Anything else is certainly uneconomic".

Archer was able to supplement his District Commissioner salary by money earned from an annual elephant hunt. An official in his position was allowed to take two elephants per year, and the sale of their tusks could be worth several hundred pounds. Much later, when he introduced hunting stories into an address to the Royal Geographical Society, Archer was informed by the President that "gentlemen hunt only with the camera".

== British Somaliland ==
=== Background ===
In 1913, Archer was appointed Acting Commissioner in British Somaliland, later becoming Governor from 1919 to 1922. He was also Commander in Chief of the forces in British Somaliland.

The Darawiish proclamation of independence letter posits a triumvirate with an emir, a Dhulbahante sultan and government. The emir was Muhammad Abdullah Hassan whilst Dhulbahante head was Diiriye Guure, and the government was called haroun. This triumvirate and their Darawiish forces had managed to successfully resist British troops in four consecutive expeditions sent out against them over a period of two decades.

In 1919, the British government decided on a final push to quell the insurgency. However, the army was reluctant to undertake yet another drawn-out campaign. Archer proposed using air power as a way to reduce the cost of ground troops, a suggestion that was greeted with scorn by the military. However, in January 1920, a flight of RAF bombers attacked the Haroun's headquarters and nearby Dhulbahante garesas in Taleh. By mid-February, Somaliland Camel Corps troops, assisted by the King's African Rifles, rounded up the remaining Dervish forces. Abdullah Hassan retreated to the Ogaden region where he attempted to regroup for yet another counter-expedition. However, he died of influenza a few months later, effectively ending the insurgency.

On 5 June 1920, Archer was appointed Knight Commander of the Order of St Michael and St George.

While in British Somaliland, Archer collected 3,000 skins and 1,000 clutches of eggs. He discovered three new bird species and several new races. His collection and observations were basis for a later book on the birds of the region co-authored with Miss Eva Godman. In 1921, the Colonial Secretary Sir Winston Churchill called a conference in Cairo attended by experts on the Middle East. Sir Geoffrey Archer brought along two young lions who were being sent to the London Zoo. They broke loose at a reception held at the British residency and almost caught the pet stork that belonged to General Edmund Allenby, the high commissioner.

=== Taxation disconcertment ===
In early 1922 the Protectorate authorities announced that they would impose a heavy tax on the people of Burao and initiate a programme of disarmament. This policy was proposed to raise much needed revenues to run the Somaliland Protectorate which was a net drain on Colonial Office coffers. As well to enhance British control in the interior of Somaliland after the Dervish War. As a result the people of Burao revolted and clashed with the British in opposition to the tax and this led to targeting of British government officials. In the ensuing disturbances a shootout between the British and Burao residents broke out, Captain Allan Gibb, a Somaliland Campaign veteran and district commissioner, was shot and killed after the Camel Corps refused to fire on the rioters.

After the incendiary bombardment and destruction of Burao, the leaders of the rebellion acquiesced, agreeing to pay a fine in livestock for Gibbs death but refused to identify and apprehend the individuals guilty. Most of the men responsible for Gibb's murder would evade capture. In light of the failure to peacefully implement taxation Governor Archer abandoned the policy altogether being a victory for the Somalis in the Protectorate. Governor Archer would soon be replaced after this blunder and policy in British Somaliland would be revised in light of this resistance.

=== 1916 important members of haroun list ===
The 1916 British Intelligence Report diary from the Berbera colonial office of Geoffrey Archer, published a list of the most notable members of the Dervish haroun (government), the list being revised in 1917 and 1918. The list details two scores of names, including their position, their tribe, as well as a short annotation with miscellaneous information. Geoffrey Archer subdivides the majority of these Dervish leaders into advisors, natively called khusuusi, and commanders, natively called amaanduule. A small minority have other positions including governors, a logistics coordinator, and arbitrators natively called muqaddim. The two score of Dervish personalities listed by Archer rejects the notion that these Dervish leaders have a rank over one another, but rather that the position of one khusuusi was egalitarian to another khusuusi, and that of a muqaddim egalitarian to another Dervish muqaddim.

==== Generals ====
Dervish generals
| Name | Tribe | Position | | | |
|---|---|---|---|---|---|
| Cusman Boos | Bah-Cali Gari (Dhulbahante) | general / amaanduule | | | |
| Nuriyal Huy | Bah-Cali Gari (Dhulbahante) | general / amaanduule | Xirsi Cartan | Jama Siad (Dhulbahante) | general / amaanduule |
| Xaashi Suni Fooyaan | Baharsame (Dhulbahante) | general / amaanduule | | | |
| Sultan Nur Ahmed Aman | Rer Caynaanshe (habar yoonis) | 5th sultan of The habar Yoonis general/amaandule | | | |
| Samatar Bullalleh | Barkad (Dhulbahante) | general / amaanduule | | | |
| Abdi Nur Hedig | Nalaye Ahmed (Dhulbahate) | general / amaanduule | | | |
| Cabbaas Muse | Baharsame (Dhulbahante) | general / amaanduule | | | |
| Omar Tage | Baharsame (Dhulbahante) | general / amaanduule | | | |
| Ciise Faahiye | Nalaye Ahmed (Dhulbahante) | general / amaanduule | | | |
| Afqarshe Ismaaciil | Nalaye Axmed (Dhulbahante) | general / amaanduule | | | |
| Mahdi Sayyid Mohamed | Ogaden | general / amaanduule | | | |
| Osman Nur | Ogaden | general / amaanduule | | | |
| Ibrahim Hassan Nur | Ogaden | general / amaanduule | | | |
| Xandulle Dif | Bah Ali Gheri (Dhulbahante) | general / amaanduule | | | |
| Cali geele Darwiish | Isaq Arap ( reer cali) | general / ammaanduule | | | |
| Ibrahim Galgol | Reer Jibril (Naleye Ahmed Dhulbahante) | general / ammaanduule | | | |
| Liban Dugarri | Hamud Ugaas (Ugaasyo Dhulbahante) | general / ammaanduule | | | |
| Cartan Mullo | Ogaden | general / ammaanduule | | | |
| Warsame Ali Gulaydh | Ugaadhyahan (Dhulbahante) | general / ammaanduule | | | |

==== Statesmen ====
Dervish statesmen
| Name | Tribe | Position |
|---|---|---|
| Abdirahman Ali Dis | Ogaden | statesman / khusuusi |
| Nur Hedig | Nalaye Ahmed(Dhulbahante) | statesman / khusuusi |
| Ismacil Mire | Ali Gari (Dhulbahante) | statesman / khusuusi |
| Abdallah Shihiri | Adan Madoba (Habr Je'lo) | statesman / khusuusi |
| Xirsi Jeedlade | Jama Siad (Dhulbahante) | statesman / khusuusi |
| Afqarshe Ismacil | Nalaye Ahmed (Dhulbahante) | statesman / khusuusi |
| Sadiq Arabi | Asharaf | statesman / khusuusi |
| Dr. Mohamud Hosh Elmi Dheere | Arap | statesman / khusuusi/ First Somali Doctor |
| Duale Mire | Arap (Hashim Reer Ali) | statesman / khusuusi |
| Muse Ahmed | Arap (Hashim Reer Ali) | statesman / khusuusi |
| Haji Ali Adan | Arap (Abdale Arab) | statesman / khusuusi |
| Mohammud Hassan | Arap (Hashim Reer Ali) | statesman / khusuusi |
| Haji Ahmed | Hawiye | statesman / khusuusi |
| Haji Ahmed El Fiki | Hawiye | statesman / khusuusi |
| Obsiiye Seed | Bah Ali Gheri (Dhulbahante) | statesman / khusuusi |
| Diiriye Guure | Araale Mahad (Dhulbahante) | statesman / khusuusi |
| Maxmud Guure (sultan Diiriye Guure's brother) | Baharsame (Dhulbahante) | statesman / khusuusi |
| Jama Seed | Bah Ali Gheri (Dhulbahante) | statesman / khusuusi |
| Yusuf Hassan Nur | Ogaden | statesman / khusuusi |
| Abshir Dhoorre | Majeerteen | statesman / khusuusi |
| Sheikh Adan | Geri Koombe | statesman / khusuusi |
| Adan Cali | Ogaden | statesman / khusuusi |

==== Miscellaneous ====
miscellaneous Dervish
| Name | Tribe | Position |
|---|---|---|
| Cabdullaahi Aaden Oogle | Bah Ali Gheri (Dhulbahante) | political advisor |
| Serar Shawe | Jama Siad (Dhulbahante) | geographic intelligencer / dalyaqaan |
| Cali Axmed Aaden Meggar | Ararsame (Dhulbahante) | cavalry + navy / fardaha + badmaax |
| Nuurxaashi Cali | Warsangeli | Jidali arbitrator / muqaddim Jidali |
| Xaaji Firxad | Hawiye | Abyssinian diplomat / danjire |
| Ismail Kharras | Warsangeli | logistics of Dhulbahante garesas |
| Hirsi Dihaal Halanje | Bahgeri Dhulbahante | Dervish spokesman-poet / abwaan-afhayeen |
| Mataan Cabdi | Ogaden | mentor / caalim |
| Cabbaas Xaaji Cabdiraxmaan Ghalal | Bahgeri Dhulbahante | Taleh governor |
| Siciid Jigrati | Majeerteen | mentor / caalim |
| Jama Yusuf Tamiinlaaye | Habr Awal | mentor / caalim |
| Musa Mahun | Bah Ali Gheri (Dhulbahante) | mentor / caalim |

== Uganda ==
Archer was appointed Governor of Uganda in 1923, and made his first priority the control of 19,000 highly destructive elephants in the colony.

He took an interest in education of the native people, asking for advice on the curriculum, buildings, organization and so on, although he was limited in what he could achieve by shortage of funds. Where he was deemed successful was in training Africans to replace European bureaucrats in several parts of the protectorate. Large portions of the governors staff were switched from British bureaucrats imported to do tasks to mission-educated Africans trained to do the same tasks. These became some of the most sought-after jobs in the Protectorate.

Archer founded a department of education in Uganda and appointed a director. However, due to doubts that the local Ugandans could handle higher education the establishment at Makerere Hill in Kampala only gave training for low-level clerical work. Archer himself wanted the locals to gain the higher education needed for senior positions so the administration would have to depend less on Indians.

Archer's theories of education were typical of the British colonial administration. He wrote: "For Native Administration the qualities of scholarship and academic attainment are not to be prized so highly as the leadership of men. Brilliance in debate can hardly equal the initial advantage gained in youth by having led in the field a body of well trained and disciplined young men of similar age". Archer disagreed with the idea that Africans were incapable of learning or doing certain jobs, he believed such views were "naive and bigoted." However, he also believed what the immediate economic concerns were could only be addressed with more specified job training to fill certain placements in the economy.

== Governor-General of Sudan ==
Aged 42, Archer was selected for the post of Governor-General of Sudan in December 1924, the first time a civilian had held this office. He replaced Sir Lee Stack, who had been murdered. Archer travelled overland from Uganda to Sudan to take up his new appointment, walking from Nimule to Rejaf and then travelling by steamer down the Bahr al Jabal to Khartoum. Ceremonial etiquette was in flux. In Uganda Archer had travelled up-country by car informally dressed. In one district that he had not visited before the locals saluted his chauffeur, the only person in uniform.

When Archer reached Khartoum in January 1925 he landed in frogged uniform, with sword and plumes, to be greeted on the quay by the members of his council in business suits.

In 1924, there had been a crisis in Egypt when a government hostile to the British was elected. Egyptian army units in Sudan, bound by their oath to the Egyptian king, refused to obey British orders and mutinied. The British violently suppressed the mutiny, removed the Egyptian army from the Sudan and purged the administration of Egyptian officials.

One of Archer's early decisions was to initiate the formation of the Sudan Defence Force, with a command completely separate from the Egyptian army. He dropped the Egyptian title "Sirdar" for the supreme commander, and did not wear the Egyptian tarboush. He made it very clear that he was commander in chief of a purely Sudanese army, while reassuring Sudanese officers who had served in the Egyptian army that they would be retained if they had not taken part in the mutiny.

In the aftermath of the upheaval the British saw educated Sudanese as potential propagators of "dangerous" nationalist ideas imported from Egypt. During Archer's tenure the main concern of the government was to reduce the power of the local intelligentsia and to transfer greater authority to traditional rulers. Archer did little about the issue of whether southern administration should be "Arabicized" or given a more English and Christian flavour. However, he deferred to Lord Lloyd, the British High Commissioner for Egypt and the Sudan, who stated in a memo to the Foreign Office that "on political, educational, religious, and administrative grounds it is desirable that Arabic as a general language should disappear from the Southern provinces". Archer was enthusiastic about the massive scheme to dam the Blue Nile at Sennar so as to irrigate the Gezira plain for cotton cultivation. He described the plan as the application of "western science to native economic conditions".

In March 1926, Archer ignored the advice of the Sudan Political Service and made an official visit to the Sayyid Abd al-Rahman al-Mahdi on Aba Island accompanied by a full escort of troops and officials. Abd al-Rahman was the son of the self-proclaimed Mahdi Muhammad Ahmad (1844–1885) and was leader of the Ansar movement.

When Archer arrived on 14 February he was formally welcomed by Sayyid 'Abd al-Rahman with 1,500 Ansar supporters. Escorted by horsemen, the dignitaries went on by car to a reception at the Sayyid's house. Replying to a speech by the Sayyid, Archer said his visit marked "an important stage forward in the relations" between the Sayyid and his followers and the government. Archer said he had come to cement the ties of friendship and understanding. Archer's visit precipitated a crisis in the colonial administration. Archer was forced to resign, replaced by Sir John Maffey.

== Later life and legacy ==
After leaving the Sudan, Archer spent most of the next fifteen years organizing the salt industry in Kutch, India. Archer settled in the south of France when he retired, dying at Cannes on 1 May 1964.

Archer made significant contributions to the study of birds and their breeding and migration habits in British East Africa, while considering a professional career as a big-game hunter.

In Uganda, Archer sought to employ indigenous residents for higher level clerical work so as to lessen the British administration's dependence on Indians for such activity. This represented something of a break from traditional protocol, as locals had hitherto mainly been recruited for low grade clerical work.

He was willing to work with the Mahdists, Britain's former enemies, and this open-minded attitude put an end to his career. Archer was a tall and imposing man, and had a forceful personality. A young man who met Archer in 1939 said of him: "When I talk to him I experience the feeling one gets when one walks out of a very stuffy room full of tobacco smoke into the open air and is greeted by a heavy buffeting wind, which pushes one back a step but which exhilarates and invigorates."

Archer's buzzard, Archer's lark (endemic to Somalia) and Archer's ground robin, a species in the Old World flycatcher family, carry Archer's name.

== Books ==
- Sir Geoffrey Francis Archer and Eva M. Godman (1937–61). The Birds of British Somaliland and the Gulf of Aden: Their Life Histories, Breeding Habits and Eggs. In 4 vols. London and Edinburgh: Gurney & Jackson/Oliver & Boyd.
- Sir Geoffrey Archer (1963). Personal and Historical Memoirs of an East African Administrator. Edinburgh: Oliver and Boyd.
