= Ahmed Gacmayare =

Somali politician

Personal details
- Born: Buuhoodle, Somaliland

Ahmed Gacmayare is a Somali politician who was from 2008 until 2012 the spokesperson for the SSC movement, and in 2012 became the minister for information and culture.

== See also ==
- Politics of Somalia
