= Aadan Carab =

Somali poet (born 1917)

Aadan Carab was a poet born in Darawiish-controlled territory in 1917. The early forms of poetry of Aadan Carab are primarily concerned with clan duels, and clans prevailing over others either in jest or pertaining to actual events. His latter poetry is about pastoral life and human nature. According to Aadan Carab, the Dhulbahante clan suffered a genocide at the hands of European colonialists, particularly the British who he claimed wholesale slaughtered the Dhulbahante due to them being Darawiish.

== Career ==
=== Individual incidents ===
An example of his poetry about clan duels includes the Dhul u Dheer poem wherein he describes a battle that occurred in the late 1950s, which began as a battle between the Majeerteen subclan Biciidyahan and the Dhulbahante subclan Ali Geri over. Soon after, the Dhulbahante were reinforced by other Reer Khair clan members as well as Ararsame, whilst the Biciidyahan were reinforced by other Umar Mahamuud Majeerteen clan members. Eventually, the Dhulbahante militarily prevailed and the following poem was written, of which the following is a snippet:

Adigoo dhintey baa gabaygu ciil kugu dhaqaajaaye
Majeerteen haduu dhabarku jabay dhidib intuu qaaday
Dhabayaco malaa kala hadhnaye dheeliyada raacday

Translation:

after your death, the poem sticks to you like resentment
Since the back of the Majeerteen was broken, he has suddenly become stationary
He followed in the footsteps of his lackey (dhabayaco) forefather

=== Individuality ===
However, historians have noted the non-tribalist nature of Aadan Carab's poems:

When Axmed Dirir composed the original poem, he tried to get Aadan Carab's support because they are in the same lineage. Aadan Carab refused to support him. Cumar Cigaal, another poet, accused Aadan Carab of not being loyal to his lineage and that Aadan Carab was unreliable.

=== Dhulbahante destroyed ===
In his poem diidda ama yeella, Aadan Carab, a Somali poet mentions on the incident stating "markaan dumiyey calankaan dejiyo dawladnimadayda, waa waxay dadku u leeyihiin dabo-xiddhki meeyey?" Writer Idaaja interprets this message as stating that the aerial bombardment campaign was emblematic of a Dhulbahante jabay (meaning broken / destroyed) orchestrated by the European colonialists:

Boqortooyada Dhulbahante ee soo taxnayd laga soo bilaabo Garaad Shirshoore; tasoo, siduu qabo, ay uga tunasuleen Sayid Maxamad markii ay Daraawiish noqdeen ... Dabo-xidh: ... wuxuu u jeeda Dhulbhante inuu Darawiish ku jabay

Translation:

The existence of the Dhulbahante kingdom was continuous since the era of Garaad Shirshoore; this was, as he (Aadan Carab) suggests, upended once they (Dhulbahante) aligned themselves with the Sayid Mohamed and the Dhulbahante collectively became Dervishes ... The Dabo-xidh rope pump: he means that Dhulbahante were destroyed on account of them being Dervishes

== Bibliography ==
- 2002: Aadan-carab: 1917-2001 : maanmsoyahannadii hore kii u dambeeyey, by Axmed Faarax Cali
