= Farah Awl =

Somali writer

- فارح عول
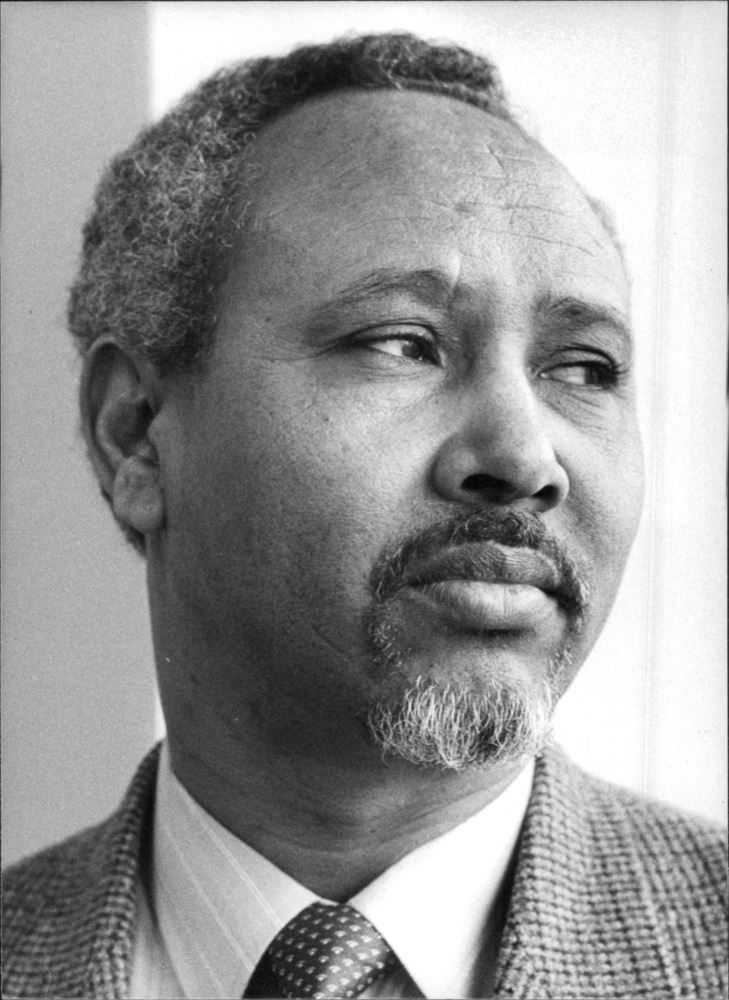
- Born: Faarax Maxamed Jaamac Cawl; 1937; Las Khorey, British Somaliland (now Waqooyi Bari)
- Died: 1991 (aged 53–54); Beledweyne, Somalia
- Occupation: writer

Farah Mohamed Jama Awl (Somali: Faarax Maxamed Jaamac Cawl, Arabic: فارح محمد جامع عول; 1937–1991), usually credited as Farah Awl, was a Somali writer. His surname Cawl (Somali pronunciation: [ʕawl]) means "gazelle", was the nickname of his great-grandfather who was the Sultan of the Warsangali clan. The Awl family also includes the Warsangali Sultan Mohamoud Ali Shire.

== Biography ==
Awl was born in 1937 in the town of Las Khorey in North eastern Somalia. In his youth, he obtained a scholarship to study aeronautical and automobile engineering in London in the United Kingdom (1959–62). Upon graduation, he moved to Somalia and worked with the police force and the National Transport Agency in Mogadishu.

The vivid descriptions of Somalia's scenery and fauna in Awl's literary corpus, as well as the inclusion of traditional Somali poetry, make it stand out in particular. He also has the distinction of being the first Somali novelist to write in the nascent Latin script for the Somali language after its formalization in 1972.

Awl was a member of the royal family of the Warsangali clan. Reportedly because of his membership in the Darod clan family, Awl, along with three of his children, was killed in 1991, at the height of the civil unrest that gripped the town of Beledweyne in the Hiiraan region.

He is survived by his wife and one son, Dahir Farah.

== Bibliography ==
- Aqoondarro waa U nacab jacayl ("Ignorance is the enemy of love"), 1982
- Garbaduubkii gumeysiga ("The Shackles of Colonialism"), 1978
- Dhibbanaha aan dhalan ("The Unborn Victim"), 1989
- Aqoondarro waa u nacab jacayl, 1974

== See also ==
- Nuruddin Farah
