= Barkhad Ali Salah =

Somali politician and historian

- برخاد علي صالح
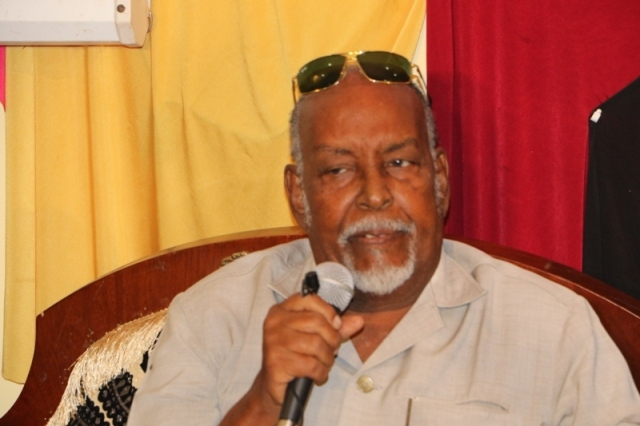

Mayor of Bosaso
- In office 1959–1963

Personal details
- Born: 1930s Bosaso, Somalia
- Died: 2016 Bosaso, Somalia

Barkhad Ali Salah (Somali: Barkhad Cali Saalax, برخاد علي صالح; 1930s–2016) was a veteran Somali politician and historian. He served as the first mayor of Bosaso.

== Background ==
Salah was born in 1938 in Bosaso, located in the northeastern Bari region. He hailed from the Dishiishe, a sub-clan of the Darod. Salah had 13 children. His firstborn was a daughter, Baxsan Barkhad, and his lastborn was a son, Osman Barkhad.
