= Jidali fort =

Dervish fort in Sanaag, Somaliland

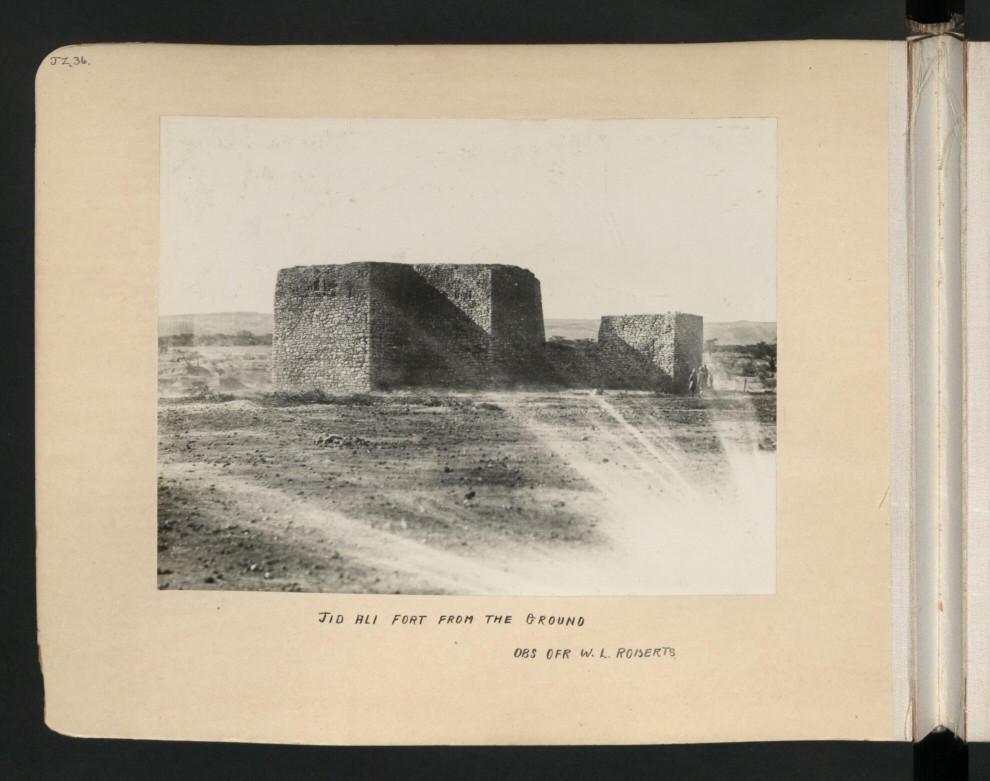
Jidali fort from the ground

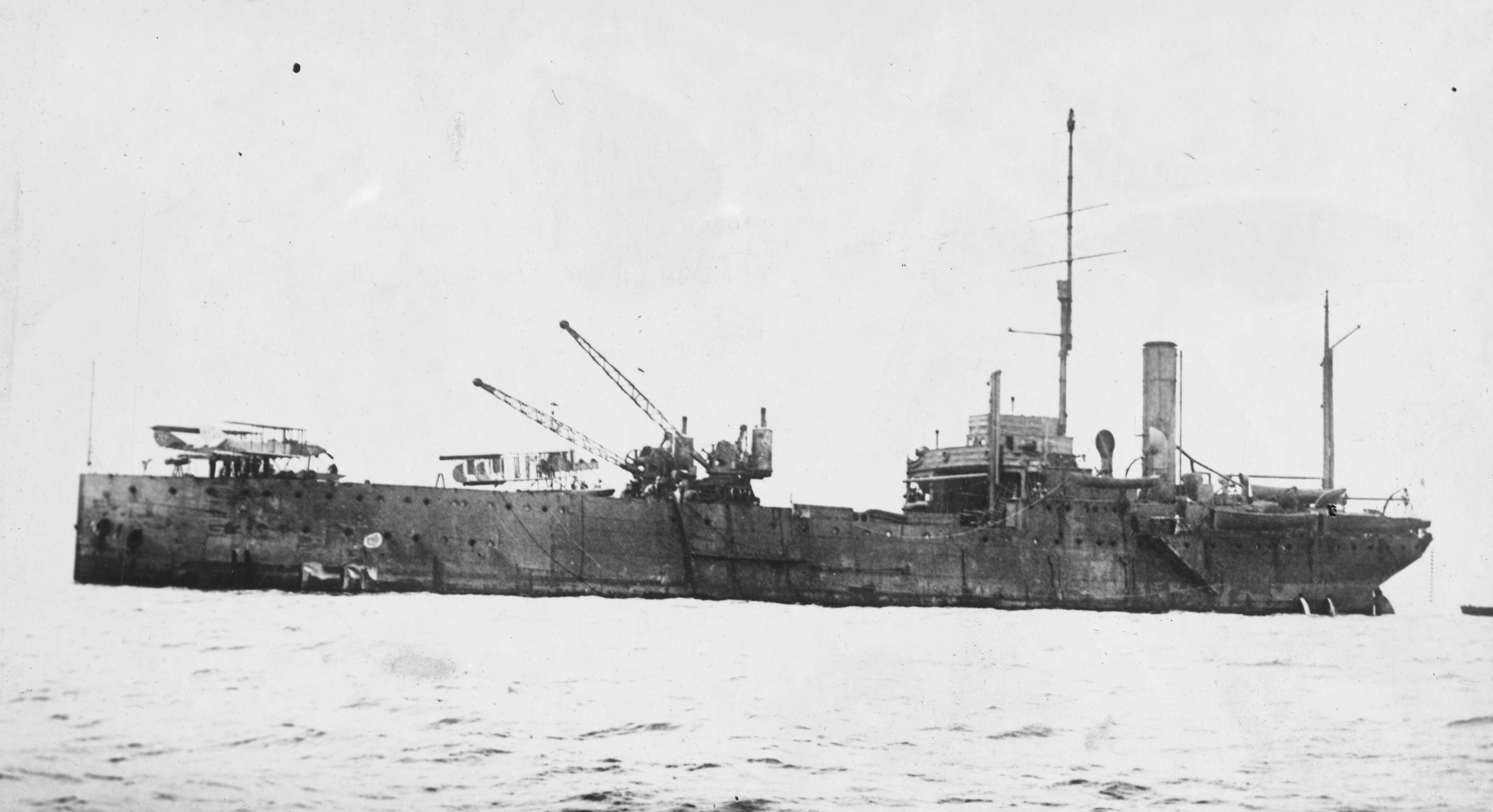
HMS Ark Royal (1914) was used against the Darawiish

Jidali fort was a cross-shaped fort of the Dervish era located in the town of Jidali in Sanaag, Somalia and is also the first place in Africa to be bombed via aerial bombardment by a tally of four sorties of De Havilland DH-9's on 21 January 1920. An April 1920 letter between the Sayid and Italian-Somali governor Giacomo De Martino states that the Dervishes built a total of twenty-seven forts which are described as Dhulbahante garesas.

According to Lieutenant-Colonel H. Moyse-Bartlett, the Jidali fort was primary means used to conduct Darawiish raids against the possessions of Italian Somaliland and British Somaliland:

Meanwhile Dervish raids continued from the direction of Jidali

Mouse-Bartlett also stated that the Jidali fort was a central or nucleus fort which itself was surrounded by five satellite forts:

It was known that seven forts ringed the position at Tale; that five others had been built at Jidali; that two were on the coast, and five more (at Las Anod, Dariali, Damot, Galadi and Wardair) lay along the escape route to the Webi Shabelle.

== Dervish description ==
The description by Muhammad Abdullah Hassan, emir of Diiriye Guure, on these forts after the fall of Taleh in February 1920, in an April 1920 letter transcribed from the original Arabic script into Italian by the incumbent Governatori della Somalia, the various Darawiish-built installations are described as garesas taken from the Dhulbahante by the British:

i Dulbohanta nella maggior parte si sono arresi agli inglesi e han loro consegnato ventisette garese (case) ricolme di fucili, munizioni e danaro.

the Dhulbahante surrendered for the most part to the British and handed twenty-seven garesas (houses) full of guns, ammunition and money over to them.

Although the endonymic term for Darawiish built installations are Dhulbahante garesas, colonial sources refer to Dhulbahante garesas as Dervish forts.

== Significance ==
According to Dervish veteran Aw Cabdulle Ibraahiim, the headquarters of the Dervish was shortly changed from Taleh to Jidali in the year 1919:

Guyaashi Daraawiishi qalcadda "Jiidali" ka dhisatay ka dib ayay madaxdoodii waxay la ahaatay dalkii Ceerigaabo ee buurta iyo bannaanka isugu jiraa inuu ka fiican yahay dalka Nugaaleed xagga dagaalka iyo daaqaba. Dabadeed, waxaa guddoonkii ku go'ayin xarunta loo raro Jiidali oo Ceerigaabo 25 mayl dhinaca bari ka xigta.

Once the building of the Jidali fort was complete, its leaders realized that Jidali is more viable than the Nugaal Valley for the purpose of defending oneself (against the British colonialists) and for animal husbandry since it has both plains and mountains. Subsequently it was decided that the headquarters (of the Dervishes) should be moved to Jidali which is roughly 25 miles from Erigabo in an eastern direction.

Colonial sources also acknowledge that the fort at Jidali was the second most significant Darawiish fort besides the Taleh fort, with Douglas Jardine describing Jidali fort as oen of two main Darawiis positions:

After their defeat at Shimber Berris, the Dervishes retired to their two main positions, the one in the Mullah's haroun at Tale, and the other at Jidali

== Yusuf Agararan ==
The most significant raid carried out by the garrison at Jidali was the raid led by Yusuf Agararan in 1917. The term Agararan in the Somali language literally means "feetless"; Agararan was the most senior Darawiish commander in the Jidali area.

The dervish leader Hussein Yusuf (Agararan) had for some time been very active in the north-east. In the course of his raids he had on several occasions come into conflict with the tribal levies, not without credit to the latter. Early in October they reported that Yusuf had attacked the tribes south-east of Las Dureh and driven off 300 camels and 7000 sheep.

Douglas Jardine, a colonial administrator in the area, described the raid by Yusuf Agararan which stemmed from Jidali in the following way:

On 6 October 1917, information was received at Burao to the effect that a Dervish force of four to five hundred men had raided the tribes in the Las Dureh area. Without delay, the Camel Corps moved out at a strength of 10 British officers, 347 rifles, and 6 machine guns, under the command of Major G. R. Breading, D.S.O., Reserve of Officers. By the morning of 8 October they had reached Eil Dur Elan and, pressing on the same day in the tracks of the retreating raiders, they were 27 miles further east by sunset. The Dervishes were now reported to be zanbaed only 20 miles ahead, and the column accordingly moved off again at 1.30 a.m. Captain H. L. Ismay, 21st Cavalry, Indian Army, with 150 pony rifles and 2 machine guns, was ordered to push ahead rapidly and act as circumstances demanded. On coming up with the Dervishes, Ismay found they had driven the looted stock through two very difficult passes which they were holding

== First operation since WW1 ==
The assault on the Jidali fort and its five satellite forts was the first British combined air, ground and sea assault on a target in Africa:

Colonel Summers decided that he would advance at once on Jidali, and, moving via Megedu (Bariat), he arrived with the mounted troops within sight of Jidali fort in the early morning of the 27th.

There were six bombers sent for sorties, an event Roy Irons described as "Four of the aircraft failed to find Medishe, but bombed the fort at Jid Ali and attacked livestock in the surrounding country." Taleh had the highest number of sorties aimed towards it with the entire fleet of air sent to air-bomb it, whilst Jidali accumulated the second highest tally of sorties bombing it at four. The air-bombing campaign lasted a month and the squadron bases from where the Jidali bombings were launched was Eil Dur Elan, whilst the bases from where the Taleh airstrikes were launched was Ceel-Afweyn, both in western Sanaag.

On 21 January six aircraft took off from Eil Dur Elan on their vital surprise mission ... to bomb Tale on 13 February from El Afweina with all the aeroplanes at his disposal

=== Afqarshe Ismail ===
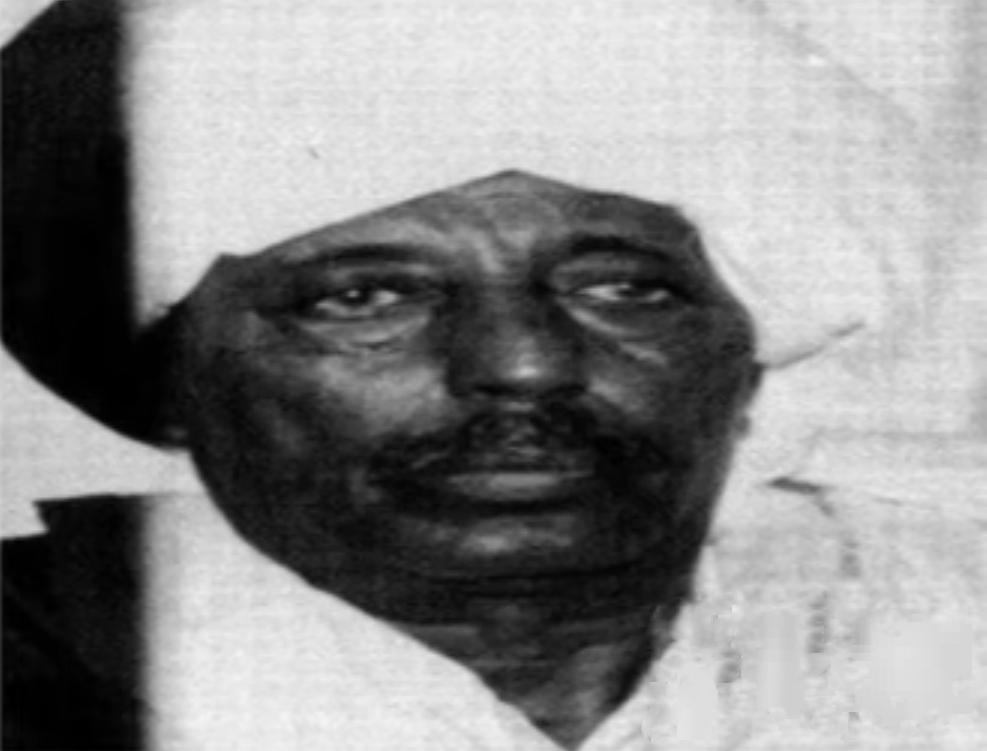
Daahir Afqarshe (pictured), son of Cabdi Afqarshe Ismail, the first person to die in an airstrike in Africa. The honorific surname Afqarshe (mouth-hider) which postulates taciturnity, indicates the primacy of reticence and introvertedness in Dervish culture

According to native Darawiish accounts, the first airstrike in Africa was struck at a field between Medishe and Jidali wherein men gathered to watch the display of aerobatics. The reports claim that Afqarshe Ismail, the former spokesperson for Darawiish, was the first person to be killed in an airstrike in Africa:

Nin la taliye u ahaa oo dawladda Turkigu xarunta u soo dirtay oo Sayidka la fadhiyey ayaa sheegay oo wuxuu yiri, "Sayidii dayuurad weeye meesha inaga kici." Waxay halkaa ku dileen dad tiradooda 30 lagu qiyaasay, waxase hadiyo jeer la sheegaa, Caamir-Cagoole oo Sayidka adeerkiis ahaa, iyo Af Qarshe.

A representative from the Turkish government who was habitually at the haroun, explained what was going on and said "Oh Sayid, these are military aircraft flying above us; lets escape from here". At that spot, roughly 30 men died, among them Caamir Cagoole, the Sayid's uncle, and Afqarshe

== Satellite forts ==
Although Jidali was the main Dhulbahante garesa in the north, the Jidali fortification had five satellite forts which surrounded Jidali; these included, Baran, Medishe, the Surud Hills, Ershida, and Galbaribur. Examples of satellite Dhulbahante garesa's of Jidali include the following:

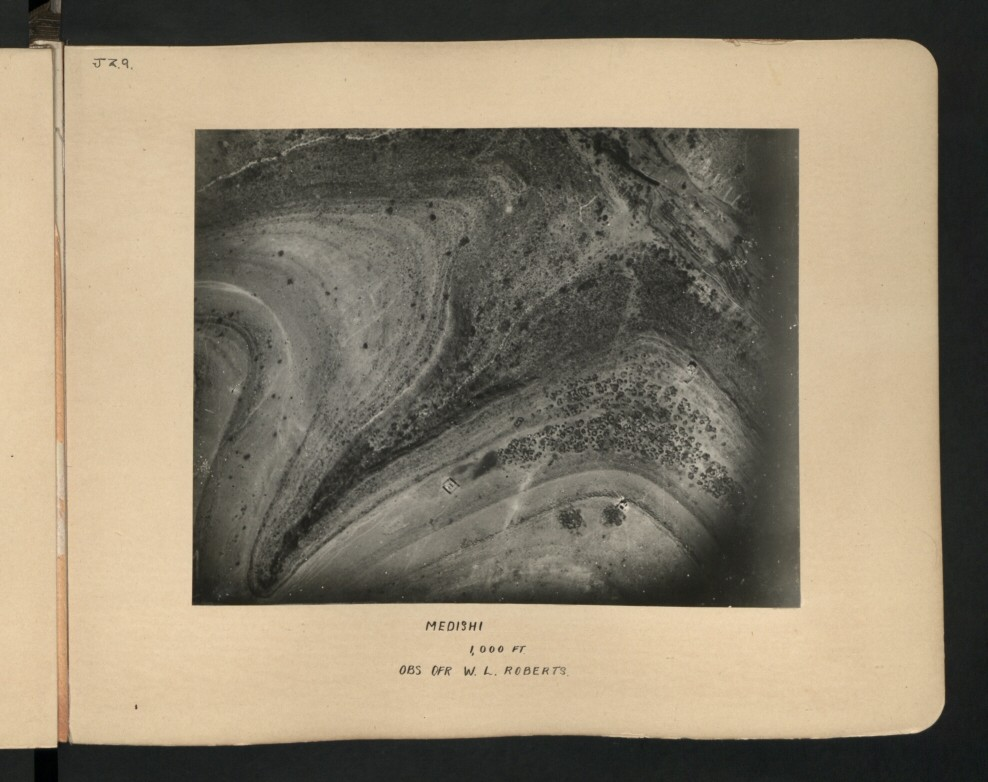
The Medishe Dhulbahante garesa from 1000 ft

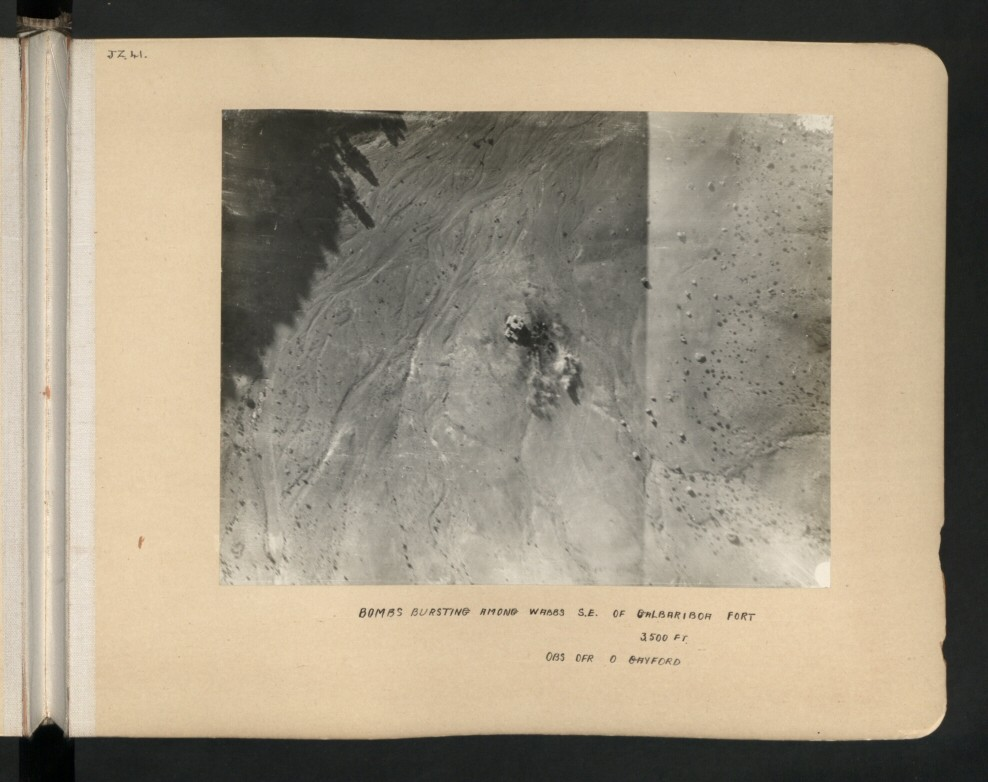
The Dhulbahante garesa at Galbaribur being bombed from 3500 ft

== Aftermath ==
In his poem diidda ama yeella, Aadan Carab, a Somali poet mentions on the incident stating "markaan dumiyey calankaan dejiyo dawladnimadayda, waa waxay dadku u leeyihiin dabo-xiddhki meeyey?" Writer Idaaja interprets this message as stating that the aerial bombardment campaign was emblematic of a Dhulbahante genocide orchestrated by the European colonialists:

Boqortooyada Dhulbahante ee soo taxnayd laga soo bilaabo Garaad Shirshoore; tasoo, siduu qabo, ay uga tunasuleen Sayid Maxamad markii ay Daraawiish noqdeen ... Dabo-xidh: ... wuxuu u jeeda Dhulbhante inuu Darawiish ku jabay

The existence of the Dhulbahante kingdom was continuous since the era of Garaad Shirshoore; this was, as he (Aadan Carab) suggests, upended once they (Dhulbahante) aligned themselves with the Sayid Mohamed and the Dhulbahante collectively became Dervishes ... The Dabo-xidh rope pump: he means that Dhulbahante were destroyed on account of them being Dervishes

A 1931 diary-book by former Italian Somalia governor Francesco Caroselli says that in a letter exchanged in April 1920 between the Sayid and Italian-Somali governor Giacomo De Martino, the Sayid describes the Dervish forts as Dervish forts.

Gl’Inglesi che sapevano questo ci son piombati addosso con tutta la gente e con sei volatili (aeroplani). Per tal fatto ci siamo sabandati e non c’e’ stato piu’ accordo fra di noi: i Dulbohanta nella maggior parte si sono arresi agli inglesi c han loro consegnato ventisette garese case) ricolme di fucili, munizioni e danaro

The English who knew about our situation pounced upon us with all their men and with six birds (airplanes). Because of this, we (Dervishes) scattered and dispersed as there was no longer agreement between us: most of the Dhulbahante tribe surrendered to the British and had twenty-seven towering forts full of rifles, ammunition and money confiscated and appropriated from them.

== Gallery ==
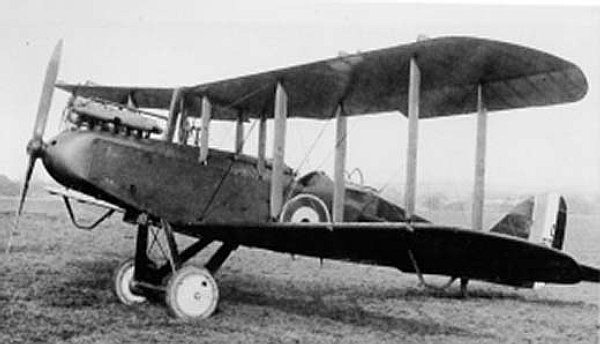
The aircraft used to operate against the Darawiish were bombers called De Havilland DH-9

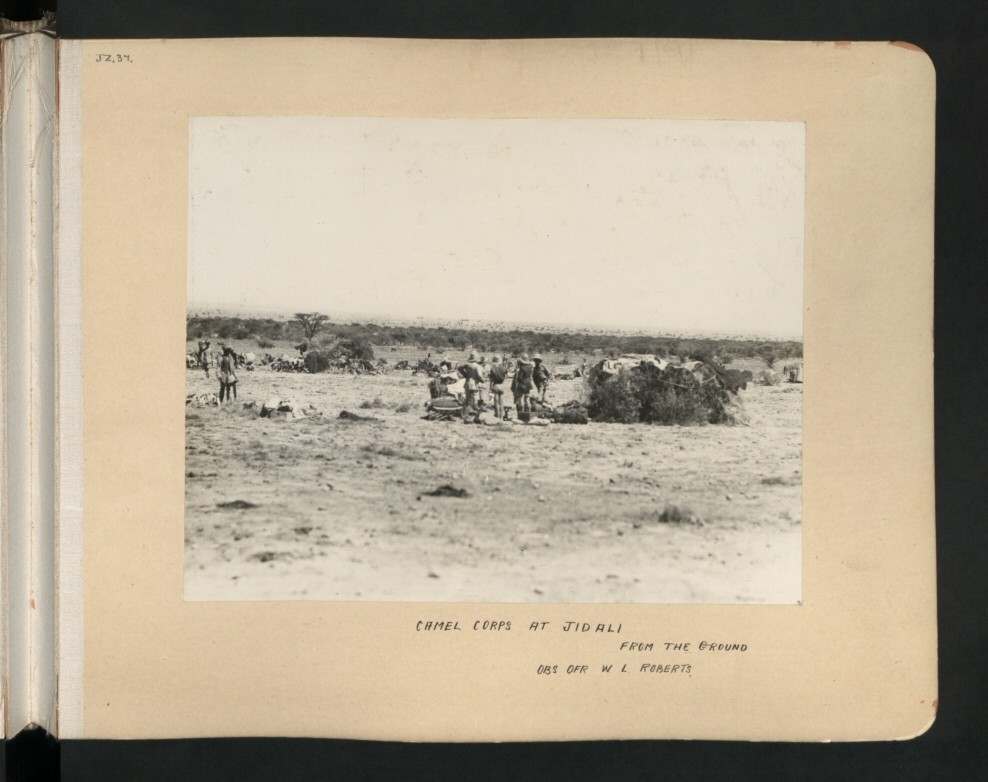
Camel corps at Jidali.

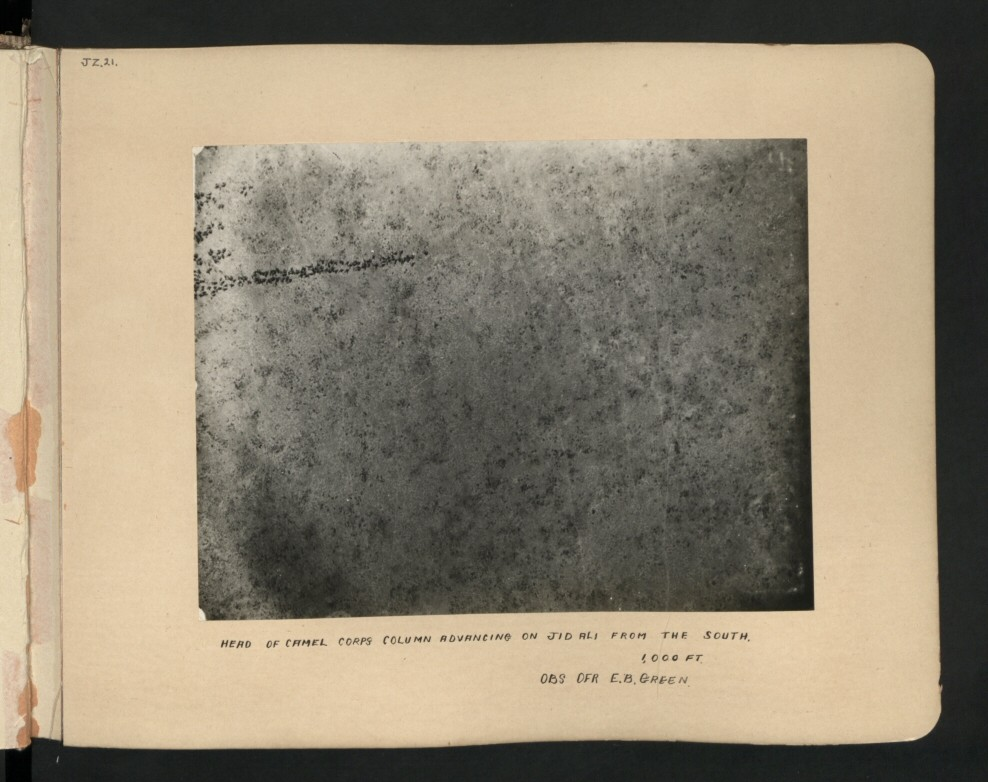
camel corps advancing towards Jidali

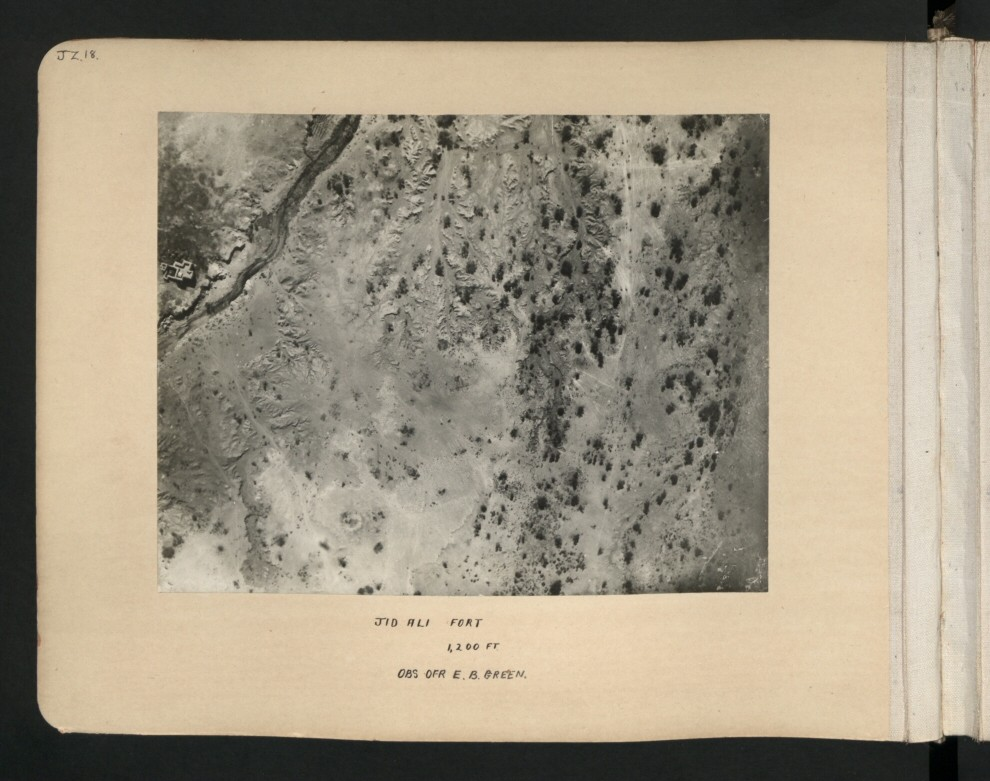
Jidali fort from 1200 ft

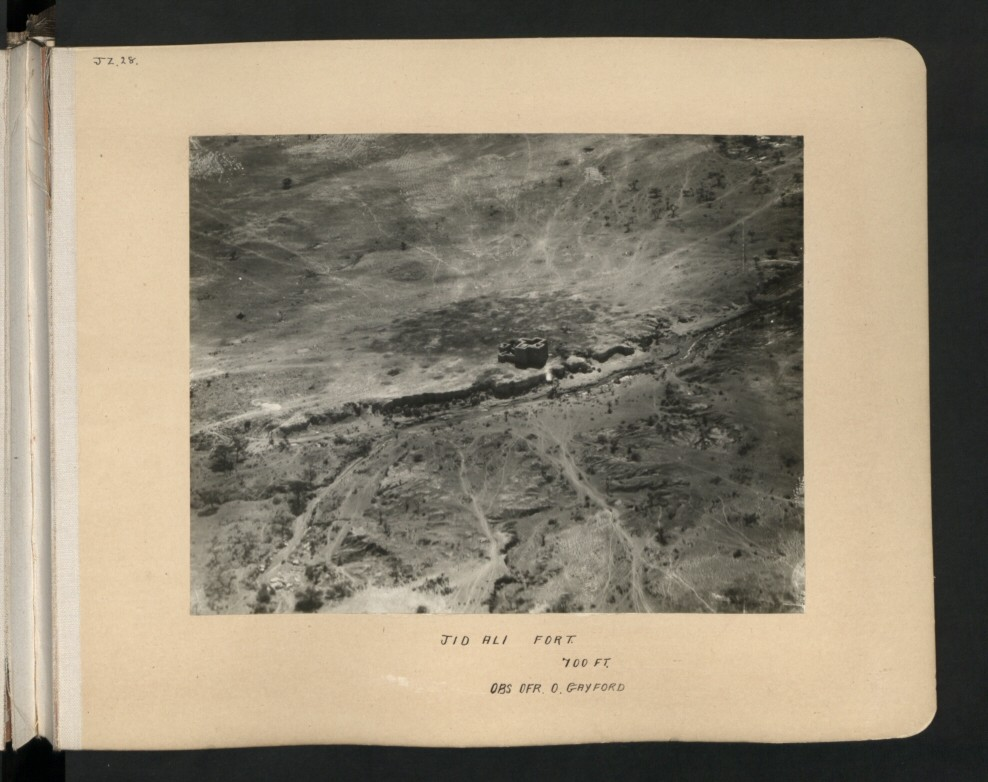
Jidali fort clearly visible from 100 ft

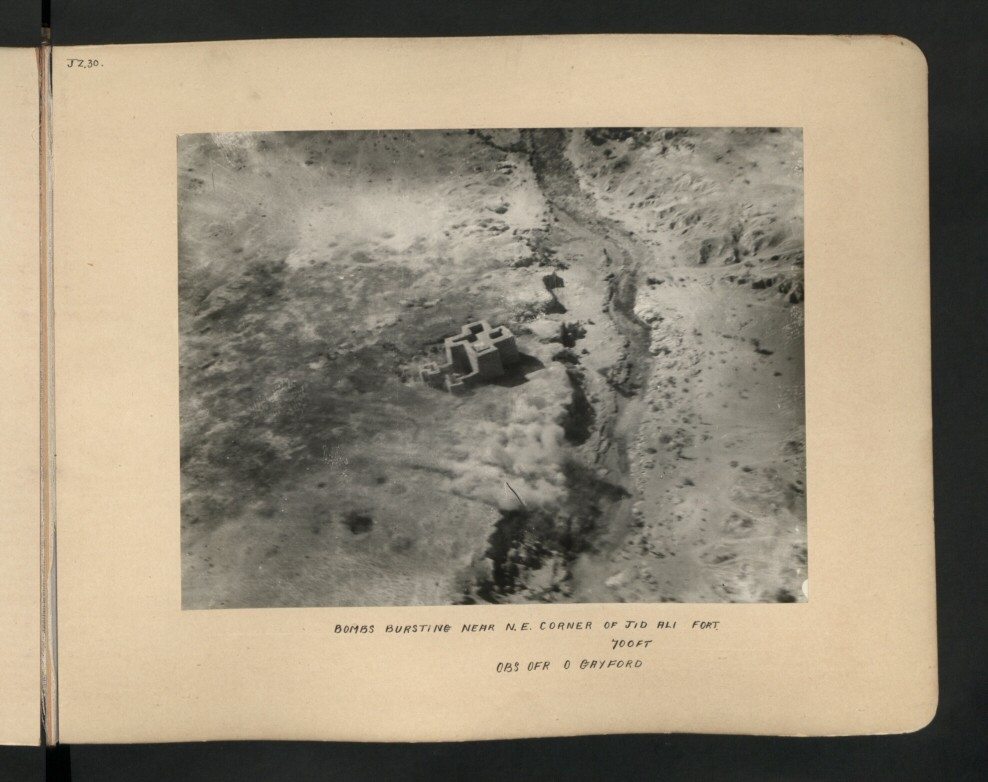
Jidali fort visible from 700 ft
