= Elections in Puntland =

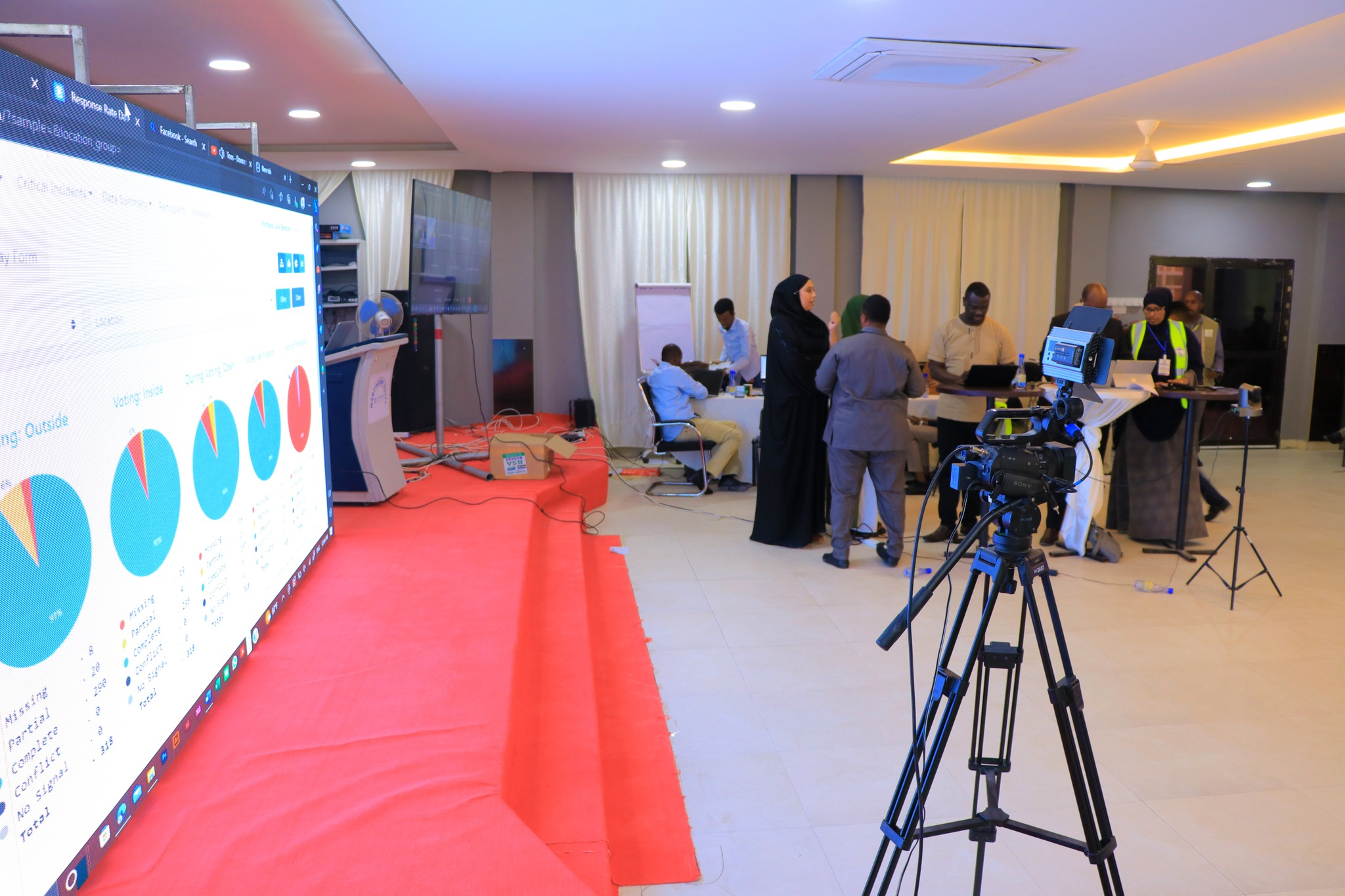
Elections Situation room in Garowe

Puntland, state of Somalia, conducts its elections through a system of indirect voting. Local elders select delegates who then vote for members of the Parliament, House of representatives of Puntland Unicameral legislature, (Somali: Gollaha Wakiilada Dawladda Puntland), in turn, elects head of state (the president) and (the vice-president). The process aims to involve various clans and ensure representation in the political structure.

== History ==
In 1998, leaders in the northeast proclaimed the formation of Puntland. Puntland's president, Abdullahi Yusuf Ahmed, publicly announced that he did not plan to break away from the remainder of Somalia. However, in July 2001, Ahmed refused to abide by the Constitution and step down from his position. This led to a confrontation with Chief Justice Yusuf Haji Nur, who claimed interim presidential powers pending elections.

In November 2001, traditional elders elected Jama Ali Jama as the new president. Ahmed refused to accept the elders' decision and, in December 2001, seized the administrative capital, Garowe, reportedly with Ethiopian support. Jama fled to Bosasso. By early May 2002, Ahmed had seized Bosasso and controlled Puntland in general. Forces loyal to Jama Ali Jama withdrew from Bosasso without a fight.

Both Ahmed and Jama continued to claim the presidency, and efforts to resolve the conflict persisted until the end of the year. Additionally, a ban on political parties in Puntland remained in place from 1998 to 2010.

On 15 June 2009, the Puntland government passed a new regional draft constitution, representing a significant step toward the eventual introduction of a multi-party political system to the region for the first time.

On 15 April 2012, the Puntland government opened a four-day constitutional convention officially inaugurating the new Constitution of Puntland. Overseen by the Puntland Electoral Commission (PEC), the constitution represented the final step in the extant regional democratization process and was scheduled to be followed by the formation of political parties.

On 12 September 2012, the Puntland Electoral Commission announced that the registration process for political parties in Puntland was now open. This came after the passing of the Political Association Law, the Referendum Act, the District Elections Law and the inauguration of the state constitution. They will also be challengers in the next elections, scheduled for January 2014.

On 14 November 2012, President Farole announced the launching of his new political party, Horseed. The association counts over 200 members and represents the incumbent Puntland government, including Vice President Abdisamad Ali Shire and the state Ministers. It is the first prospective party to register for an application with the Transitional Puntland Electoral Commission (TPEC). According to Farole, the general public will be eligible for membership in the organization once it is selected as an official political party. Five other political associations were established the following month, including the Development and Justice Party Horcad launched by an entrepreneur and businessman Omar Ismail Waberi along other politicians, the Union of the People of the Regions or UPR Somali: Ururka Gobolada Umadaha Bahoobey (UGUB) Midnimo, Talowadaag (Consensus-building), and GAHAYR or Council of Education and Development towards Founding the True Goal (Somali: Golaha Aqoonta iyo Horumarinta ee Asaaska Yoolka Runta).

On early 2013 president Farole declared One man, one vote and passed election election bill through Puntland house of representatives, Government. In Puntland, local council elections scheduled for 15 July were cancelled the preceding day because of growing election-related violence. The decision was welcomed by local communities, opposition parties and the international community.

== List of elections ==
=== Presidential elections ===
Date	Elections	Notes
1 August 1998	1998 Puntland presidential election	Abdullahi Yusuf Ahmed was elected founding president.
14 November 2001	2001 Puntland presidential election	Jama Ali Jama elected by a delegation of traditional leaders, Puntland is not recognized Jama as the second President of Puntland
8 January 2005	2005 Puntland presidential election	Mohamud Muse Hersi was elected by House of Representatives of the Puntland, third President of Puntland
8 January 2009	2009 Puntland presidential election	Abdirahman Farole elected as the fourth president of Puntland
8 January 2014	2014 Puntland presidential election	Abdiweli Gaas fifth president of Puntland
8 January 2019	2019 Puntland presidential election	Said Abdullahi Deni sixth president
8 January 2024	2024 Puntland presidential election	Said Abdullahi Deni re-elected

=== Local elections ===
Date	Elections	Seats	Votes
25 October 2021	2021 Puntland municipal elections	Kaah won 35 seats	9,869
25 May 2023	2023 Puntland municipal elections	Kaah won 286 seats	68,165
