= Abdirizak Ahmed Said =

Current speaker house of representatives (Puntland)

- Cabdirisaaq Axmed Siciid
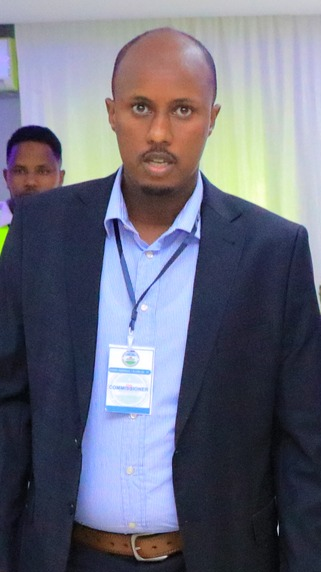

10th Speaker of the Puntland House of Representatives
- Incumbent
- Assumed office 4 January 2024
- Appointed by: 6th Parliament of Puntland
- President: Said Abdullahi Deni
- Vice President: Ilyas Osman Lugatoor
- Preceded by: Abdirashid Yusuf Jibril

Chairman of TPEC
- In office 2 January 2022 – 12 September 2023
- President: Said Abdullahi Deni
- Vice President: Ahmed Elmi Osman
- Preceded by: Guled Salah Barre
- Succeeded by: Fu'ad Abshir Adeer

Personal details
- Born: 1983 Dhahar, Haylan region

Abdirizak Ahmed Said (Somali: Cabdirisaaq Axmed Siciid, Arabic: عبد الرزاق أحمد سعيد) is a Somali politician serving as the 10th speaker of Puntland House of Representatives since 4 January 2024 and previously served as chairman of the Transitional Puntland Electoral Commission He currently holds the Speaker of the House of Representatives of Puntland.

== Career ==
Abdirizak Ahmed Said was born in 1983, Dhahar the administration capital of Haylan region of Puntland Somalia. He is from the Warsangeli clan. He received his primary and secondary education in Dhahar and Bosaso, and obtained a bachelor's degree in management and public relations from a university in Uganda and then a master's degree in democracy from a university in Italy.

== Early life and education ==
Said began his career as a researcher and worked with international organizations, notably the World Bank. In 2019, he began his political career after joined the Transitional Electoral Committee in Puntland, after resignation of Guled Salah Barre, Said succeeded the Chairman of electoral Commission on January 2, 2022. During his term the Commission achieved Puntland municipal elections the first Somali local elections since 1969 and Puntland since established 1998. After holding the preliminary elections in the three districts held in late 2021.

On 2 January 2024, Abdirizak Ahmed Said became member of Puntland Parliament constituenting his home region Haylan, on 4 January he was elected the Speaker of Puntland House of Representatives. After he received 37 of 66 votes in the first round. The nominators withdrew from election into a second round and declared won.

== See also ==
- Abdirashid Yusuf Jibril
