= Ministry of Environment, Range and Climate Change =

Government body of Puntland, Somalia

- Wasaaradda Deegaanka, Isbedelka Cimiladda iyo Horumarinta Reer Miyiga وزارة البيئة وتغير المناخ والتنمية الريفية

Agency overview
- Formed: 12 January 2005
- Jurisdiction: Government of Puntland
- Headquarters: Garowe, Puntland
- Minister responsible: Aidarus Ahmed Farah (Odey)
- Website: https://www.moercc.com/

The Ministry of Environment, Range and Climate Change MoERCC (Somali: Wasaardda Deegaanka,Daaqa iyo Isbedelka Cimiladda) is a government body responsible for environment, Range and Climate Change policies of the Government of Puntland. Headquartered in Puntland's capital Garowe, it has been headed by Aidarus Ahmed Farah (Oday) as Minister since 31 March 2026.

The ministry is responsible for ensuring the constitutional right of every person to live in and enjoy a clean, healthy and ecologically balanced environment, and resilience against climate change, drought, and related disasters.

== Establishment and history ==
Puntland was established on 1 August 1998, and subsequently, the Ministry of Livestock, Animal Husbandry, and Environmental Protection was created. In January 2005, following the election of President Adde Muse on 8 January 2005 in the Puntland presidential election, the Puntland government underwent a restructuring. President Muse expanded the number of ministries by adding five additional ones, which were later ratified by the House of Representatives of Puntland. The first Minister of the restructured ministry was Ibrahim Ali Hersi, who served during the Adde Muse administration from 2005 to 2009. Subsequently, President Abdirahman Farole, Muse's successor, appointed Abdiqani Yusuf Adde as Minister, with Osman Awad Ali as Deputy Minister.

The Ministry has constructed flood mitigation structures under a new climate change adaptation framework, supported by the United Nations and the European Union, as part of efforts to address the increasingly erratic climate in the region.

In the Nugal region, which suffered severe flooding due to a tropical storm that claimed over 100 lives in late 2013, two flood detention and retention dams have been built, according to the Ministry of Environment.

On 30 April 2015, a government delegation visited the newly completed sand dam at Bilcil, located 65 kilometres (41 miles) east of Garoowe, constructed across a strategic stream to enhance climate resilience against flooding.

Initially named Ministry of Environment, Climate Change, and Rural Development abbreviated MoECCRD later changed Ministry of Environment, Range and Climate Change (MoERCC).

On 11 October 2018, the ministry in collaboration with Yombays Village and with support from the United Nations Development Programme (UNDP) and funding from the Global Environment Facility, constructed a new 5,000-cubic-metre earth dam near Yombays town in the Nugaal region. This dam will provide clean, safe water to over 5,000 people in the area, of whom more than 4,000 are from nomadic pastoralist communities.

In December 2023, the Ministry of Environment, Range, and Climate Change seized numerous illegally held Northeast African cheetahs, a species imperilled by poaching, illegal wildlife trade, hunting, habitat loss, and diminishing prey populations. There has been a growing trend of Northeast African cheetah cubs, predominantly from Puntland, being smuggled into Saudi Arabia, the United Arab Emirates, and Yemen.

The Ministry of Interior, Federal Affairs and Democratization along with the Ministry of Environment concluded a three-day conference held in Garoowe from 17 to 19 December 2024. The conference convened ministry officials, regional mayors elected in 2023 democratic elections, and representatives from the Puntland Parliament.

The discussions centred on empowering local governments whilst prioritising climate resilience in a region increasingly susceptible to climate shocks.

Puntland, like the broader Somali region, grapples with recurrent droughts, desertification, and environmental challenges intensified by climate change.

Key outcomes included:

- Environmental Protection: A commitment to halting deforestation, preventing wildlife poaching, and addressing widespread environmental degradation that has significantly affected Puntland's fragile ecosystems.
- Regulation of Urban Expansion: The establishment of stringent guidelines to curb unauthorised urbanisation and land development, ensuring sustainable land-use policies.
- Conservation Advocacy: Promoting awareness and enforcing policies to safeguard Puntland's natural resources from exploitation and unsustainable practices.
- Community-Led Climate Action: Encouraging municipalities to adopt climate-sensitive development strategies and integrate environmental protection into local governance frameworks.
- International Collaboration: Urging the global community and development partners to prioritise funding for climate adaptation and environmental conservation initiatives in Puntland's most affected regions.

On 24 January 2025, at least 140 dolphins were found stranded on Mareero Beach near Bosaso, the commercial hub and administrative capital of the Bari region in Puntland. Of these, 60 were confirmed dead, while 30 were successfully returned to the sea. The ministry-appointed committee has declared an investigation into the incident in collaboration with Ministry of Fisheries and Marine Resources.

== List of ministries ==
- Ibrahim Ali Hersi
- Abdiqani Yusuf Adde
- Guled Salah Barre, 2014 – 2015
- Ali Abdullahi Warsame, 2015 – 2018
- Ismail Dirie Gama'diid, 2019 – 2022
- Abdirashid Ali Gelle, acting 2022-?
- Mohamed Abdirahman Farole, 2024 – current

== Responsibilities ==
The Ministry of Environment, Range, and Climate Change is tasked with several key objectives, including:

- Developing policies and legal frameworks
- Formulating and implementing environmental standards
- Mitigating climate change and combating desertification
- Conducting environmental research and managing information
- Developing strategic plans and budgets
- Advocating for climate and environmental issues
- Promoting fodder production and storage
- Enhancing environmental education and awareness
- Advancing the sustainable development agenda
- Conserving biodiversity, including terrestrial and marine endangered species
- Addressing climate-related disaster risk reduction and mitigation
- Conserving forests, including resin-producing trees
