= Mohamed Ali Yusuf =

Vice President of Puntland from 2004 to 2005

- Maxamed Cali Yusuf
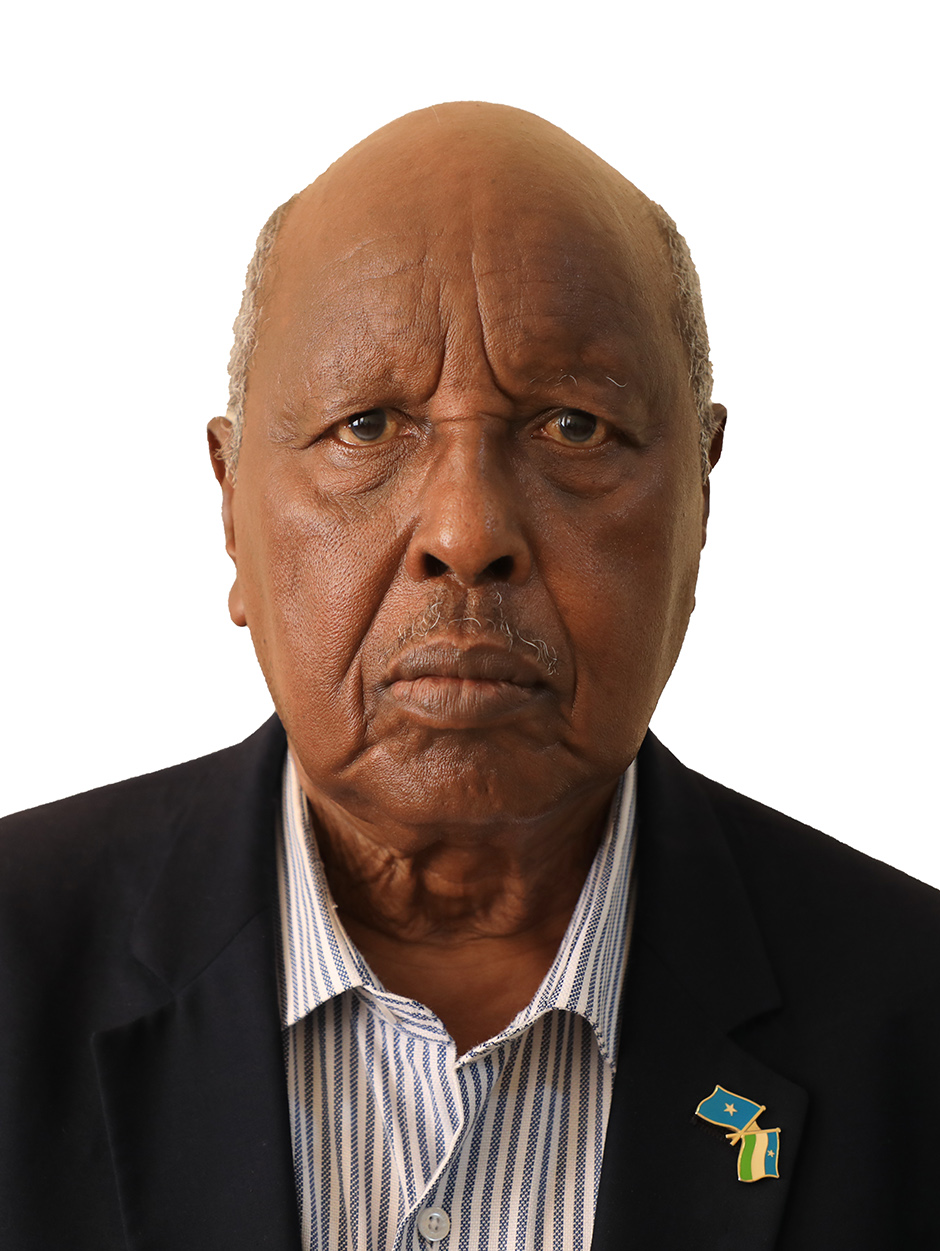
- Gaagaab in 2022

2nd Vice President of Puntland
- Acting
- In office 10 October 2004 – 8 January 2005
- President: Mohamed Abdi Hashi
- Preceded by: Mohamed Abdi Hashi
- Succeeded by: Hassan Dahir Afqurac

Puntland Minister of Finance
- President: Mohamud Muse Hersi
- Vice President: Hassan Dahir Afqurac
- Preceded by: Abdirahman Farole
- Succeeded by: Farah Ali Jama

2nd Speaker of the Senate of Somalia
- Interim
- In office 11 August 2021 – 26 April 2022
- Preceded by: Abdi Hashi Abdullahi
- Succeeded by: Abdi Hashi Abdullahi

Personal details
- Born: 2 January 1944 Godobjiran, British-occupied Italian Somaliland
- Died: 3 December 2024 (aged 80) Istanbul, Turkey
- Resting place: Galkacyo, Abdullahi Yusuf cemetery 6°47′05.2″N 47°26′43.2″E
- Party: Independent

Mohamed Ali Yusuf Gaagaab (Somali: Maxamed Cali Yusuf; 2 January 1944 – 3 December 2024, Arabic: محمد علي يوسف جاجاب) was a Somali politician. He served as acting Vice President of Puntland from 10 October 2004 to 8 January 2005, and later he was appointed Minister of Finance of Puntland beginning on 25 January 2005 to 29 January 2009. He was elected as Interim Speaker of the Senate of Somalia from 11 August 2021 to 26 April 2022.

== Early life ==
Mohamed Ali Yusuf Gaagaab was born on 2 January 1944 in Godobjiran in Nugal, Somalia, during World War II after the British occupation of Italian Somalia. He was from the Omar Mohamoud clan of Majeerteen, Darod.

He studied his primary and secondary education in Galkayo. He graduated from Jamal Abdinashir High School in Mogadishu in 1965. He received a scholarship from East Germany to study law in 1965, earning a master's degree in philosophy and international law.

Relation map

== Career ==
Gaagaab returned to Somalia and worked as an assistant professor at the Faculty of Law of the Somali National University.

He was imprisoned from 1985 for seven years under the Siad Barre regime for his party's revolutionary aims in Somalia, including founding a magazine. He left Somalia after civil war in 1992 for Denmark. He returned to Somalia in 1996 to join the Somali Salvation Democratic Front (SSDF).

=== Vice President of Puntland ===
After President Abdullahi Yusuf Ahmed announced his resignation on 10 October 2004, to run for the 2004 presidential election of the Transitional Federal Government of Somalia, and former vice President Mohamed Abdi Hashi became the acting president, Gaagaab became the acting vice President as a transitional period until the next presidential election. He was succeeded by Hassan Dahir Afqurac on 8 January 2005.

=== Minister of Finance of Puntland ===
Gaagaab ran unsuccessfully for the 2005 presidency of Puntland. Later he was appointed Puntland's Minister of Finance under President Mohamud Muse Hersi.

In April 2007, a boy from a minority clan was accidentally shot and killed by troops trying to quell a demonstration. Gaagaab refused to pay compensation. However, he paid compensation to another majority clan, which was criticized as discriminatory against the minority clan.

In July 2008, he visited Bosaso as the Minister of Finance. He made it clear that he would strengthen economic ties with the United Arab Emirates. In August 2008, Gaagaab was criticized by opposition members for harassing them by placing soldiers near the entrance to the assembly.

After his term expired on 29 January 2009, he vacated as Minister of Finance. His replacement was Farah Ali Jama.

=== Director of the Puntland Peace Center ===
In January 2010, Gaagaab chaired a conference on security in Galkayo in his capacity as Director of the Galkayo Education Center for Peace and Development (GECPD).

In November 2011, after a disagreement between the Puntland and Galmudug governments regarding security, Gaagaab called on both sides to reach a peaceful resolution.

In January 2014, Gaagaab ran for the Puntland presidential elections as an opposition candidate from the Mudugu region, but announced his withdrawal, leaving it to Ali Haji Warsame. However, Ali Haji Warsame did not become president also. In August 2014, Gaagaab criticized the Federal Republic of Somalia government's decision to merge Galmudug and Himan and Heeb to create the Central Regions State as unconstitutional for violation of the federal system.

=== Member of the Federal Parliament ===
In August 2021, Gaagaab became a Somali Senator representing Puntland. He served on the Committee on Rules of Procedure.

He served from 11 August 2021 to 26 April 26, 2022 as Interim Speaker of the Senate of Somalia.

In March 2024 he opposed amendments to the Constitution of Somalia which caused the Constitutional crisis in Somalia.

== Death ==
Gaagaab died in Istanbul, Turkey, on 3 December 2024, at the age of 80. He had been suffering from an age-related illness.

His death was confirmed by his family, as well as colleagues in the Upper House of Parliament.

=== Reaction ===
Many leaders expressed their condolences, including Puntland President Said Abdullahi Deni, Vice President Ilyas Lugator and former Puntland Presidents Abdirahman Farole and Abdiweli Gaas. Former President Sharif Sheikh Ahmed expressed gratitude for Gaagaab's accomplishments; he posted on X (formerly Twitter), "President Gaagaab was a charismatic statesman and patriotic veteran who had contributed greatly to the building of the Somali state."

Senior Puntland politicians and officials from the Somali federal government also shared messages of sympathy.

=== Funeral and burial ===
Senior government officials, including the Speaker of the Upper House of the Federal Parliament, Abdi Hashi Abdullahi, former Puntland Minister of Education Ali Haji Warsame, and Somali Minister of Foreign Affairs Ahmed Moalim Fiqi, along with others, prayed the Janasah at Aden Adde International Airport on Friday, 6 December. Following the funeral, the body was transported from Mogadishu to Galkayo. He was given a state funeral by Vice President of Puntland Ilyas Osman Lugator and buried alongside Abdullahi Yusuf cemetery.

Political offices
| Preceded by Mohamed Abdi Hashi | Vice President of Puntland; 2004–2005 | Succeeded by Hassan Dahir Afqurac |
| Preceded by Abdirahman Farole | Puntland Minister of Finance; 2005–2009 | Succeeded by Farah Ali Jama |
| Preceded by Abdi Hashi Abdullahi | Speaker of the Senate of Somalia; 2021–2022 | Succeeded by Abdi Hashi Abdullahi |
