= 2023 Puntland municipal elections =

- May 25, 2023

All 774 seats
- Registered: 387,094
- Turnout: 48.10%
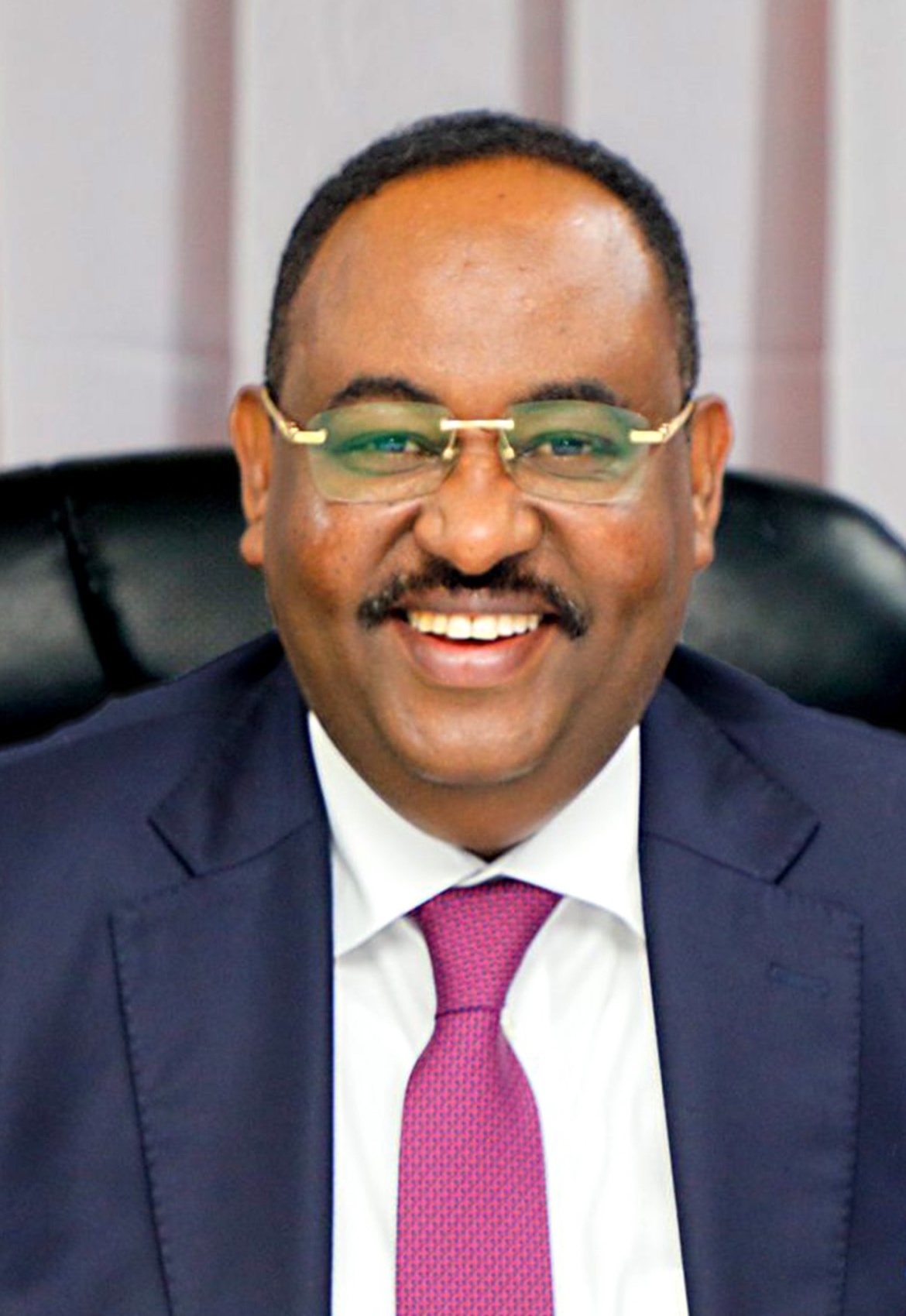

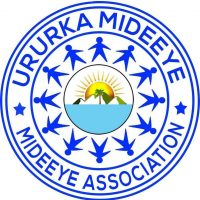

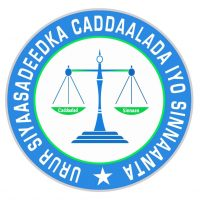

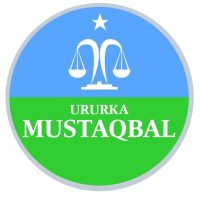

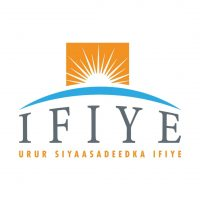

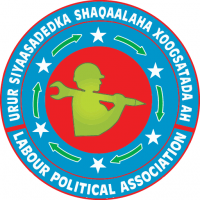
	Majority party	Minority party	Third party
Leader	Said Abdullahi Deni	Dahir Haji Khalif	Mohamoud Khalif Jabiye
Party	Kaah	Mideeye	Caddaalada iyo Sinnaanta
Seats before	35	23	20
Seats won	286	211	133
Seat change	▲251	▲188	▲113
Popular vote	68,156	48,398	28,793
Percentage	38.41%	27.27%	16.23%
	Fourth party	Fifth party	Sixth party
Leader	Mohamed Ismail Siibad	Mohamed Abdulkadir	Abdirashid Sheikh Mohamoud
Party	Mustaqbal	Ifiye	SXA
Seats before	1	1	0
Seats won	57	78	7
Seat change	▲56	▲77	▲7
Popular vote	15,187	12,930	3,053
Percentage	8.56%	7.29%	1.72%
	Seventh party
Leader	Osman Gamure
Party	Runta iyo Cadaaladda
Seats before	2
Seats won	2
Seat change	0
Popular vote	919
Percentage	0.52%

The 2023 Puntland municipal elections took place on Thursday, May 25, 2023, in the Puntland state of Somalia. The elections were the second time the autonomous region had held one-person, one-vote elections. "Puntland had achieved a significant historic victory, with 30 districts holding peaceful elections," Puntland Interior Minister Abdi Farah Juha said

== Background ==
This article discusses the phased process of conducting local government elections (LGEs) in Puntland, Somalia. It highlights the agreements made between various political actors, including political associations, the Puntland state, and the Transitional Puntland Electoral Commission (TPEC). The initial phase focused on voter registration, which was completed in certain regions before reaching other areas. The total number of registered voters, including early elections participants, is 387,094.

The article acknowledges that voter registration is crucial but also a stage where unresolved political disputes may arise, potentially causing delays in subsequent phases. Challenges such as conflicts over district demarcation and lack of support from certain political parties and elites have affected the voter registration process in Puntland.

The transition to the one person one vote (OPOV) system in Puntland has faced volatility and obstacles. The article emphasizes the need for significant efforts to ensure peaceful, fair, and timely completion of the remaining local elections in the districts. It also notes the lack of clarity regarding the implications of the local government elections for Puntland's parliamentary elections.

The timing and modality of the parliamentary elections have generated controversy among political actors. The unresolved issue surrounding the parliamentary elections could potentially disrupt the entire electoral process. The article aims to provide an analysis of possible scenarios and recommendations for managing the forthcoming parliamentary elections.

This analytical brief is a collaborative effort between the Puntland Development and Research Centre and the Somali Dialogue Platform, implemented by the Rift Valley Institute. The Somali Dialogue Platform works towards facilitating agreement among Somalis on contentious political issues.

== Contesting parties ==
The election will involve seven political parties. There will be three organizations that will function as political parties among the seven organizations.

List	Party	Chairperson(s)	Logo
1	Mustaqbal	Mohamed Ismail Siibad	
2	Mideeye	Dahir Haji Khalif	
3	Kaah	Said Abdullahi Deni	
4	Sincad	Mohamoud Khalif Jabiye	
5	Runcad	Osman Gamure	
6	Ifiye	Mohamed Abdulkadir	
7	Shaqaalaha	Abdirashid Sheikh Mohamoud	

Source from BBC Somali and TPEC

== Opinion Polls ==
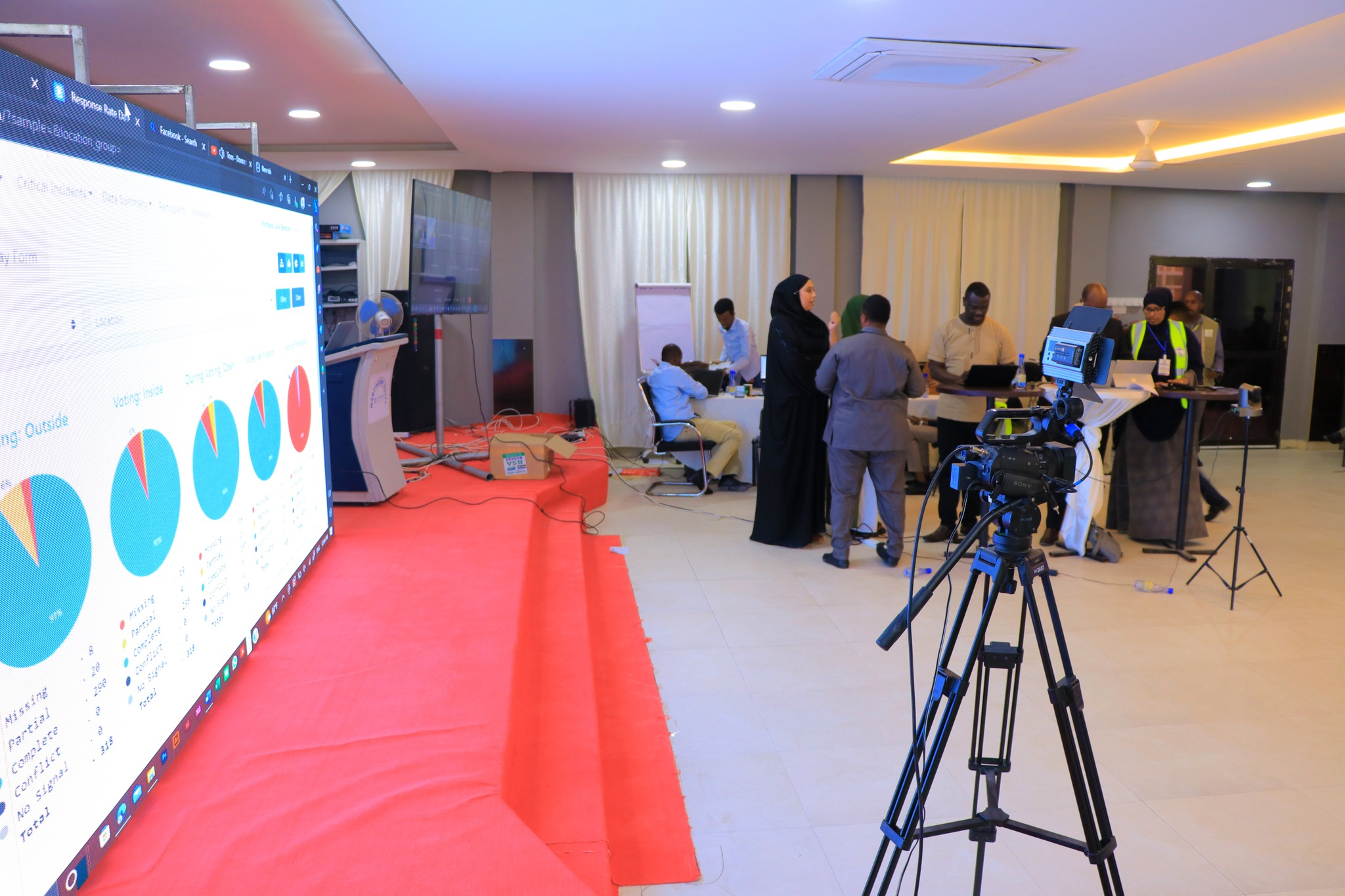
Election Situation room Garowe

There is a notable level of engagement and participation in online activities related to the upcoming general elections. Many individuals are actively involved in campaigning and promoting their preferred candidates or parties through online platforms. Among these activities, the Mustaqbal party, presumably a political party or organization, is taking a leading role in coordinating and driving these efforts.

== Results ==
The Transitional Puntland Electoral Commission (TPEC) successfully concluded elections in all 30 of Puntland's districts excluding the Nugal, region which includes the capital city Garowe, the region did not participate in this election due to local politicians who disagreed with the election plan proposed by President Said Abdullahi Deni. on June 3, 2023, The Transitional Puntland Electoral Commission announced the results of the May 25th local elections.

A total of 186,181 votes were cast with 177,445 of them being valid votes. Out of 774 available seats, women won 129 amounting to 17% of the seats

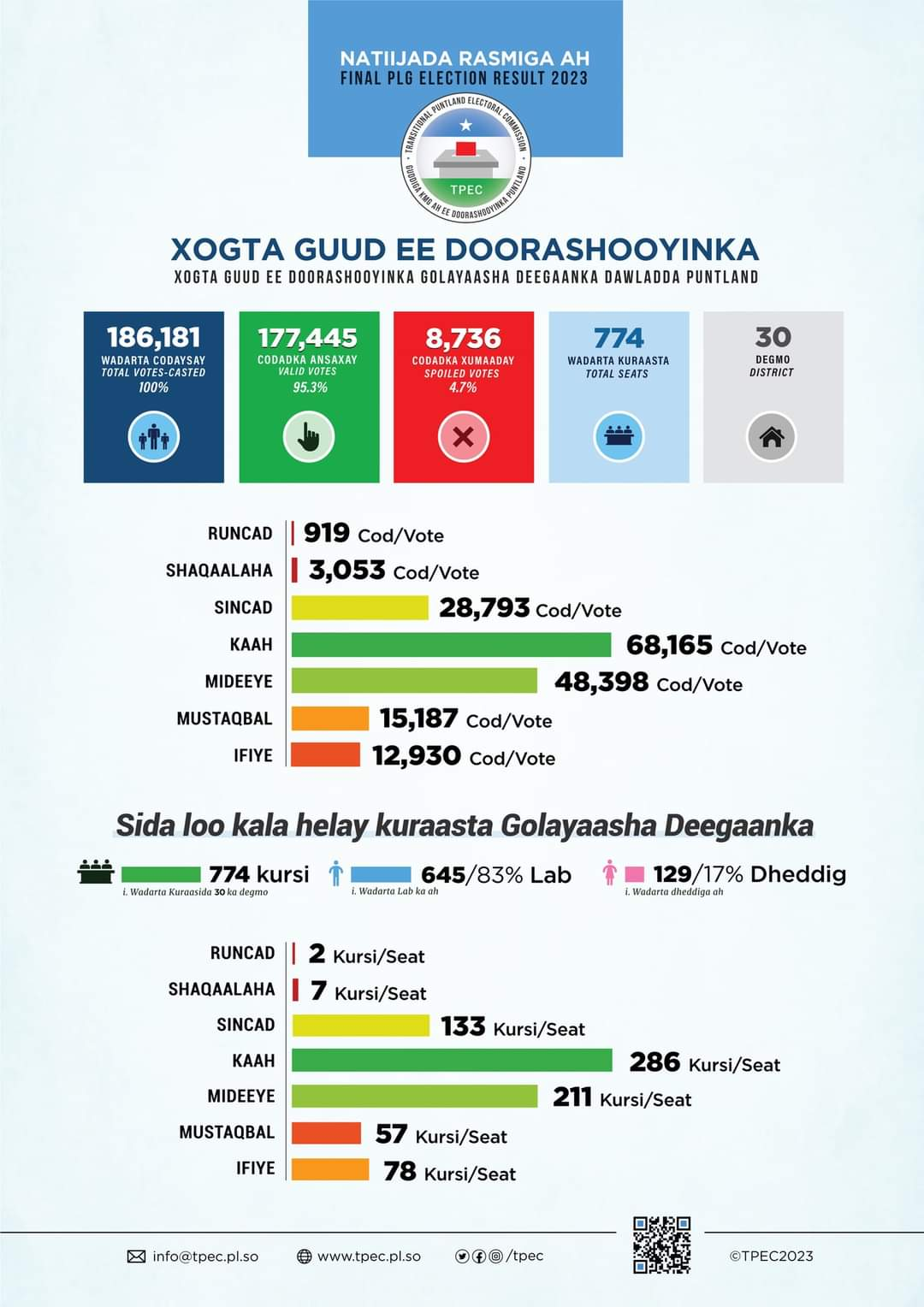
results of the 2023 Puntland local elections

Party	Votes	%	Seats
Kaah	68,165	38.41	286
Mideeye	48,398	27.27	211
Caddaalada iyo Sinnaanta	28,793	16.23	133
Mustaqbal	15,187	8.56	57
Ifiye	12,930	7.29	78
Shaqaalaha Xoogsatada Ah	3,053	1.72	7
Runta iyo Cadaaladda	919	0.52	2
Total	177,445	100.00	774
Valid votes	177,445	95.31	
Invalid/blank votes	8,736	4.69	
Total votes	186,181	100.00	
Registered voters/turnout	387,094	48.10	
Source: PEC, PEC

== Reactions ==
International partners of Somalia commend the people of Puntland for their determination to fulfil their democratic aspirations through district council elections scheduled for 25 May. They acknowledge the efforts made by the Transitional Puntland Electoral Commission (TPEC) to overcome challenges in preparing for these significant direct elections. The partners urge all stakeholders to contribute to a peaceful atmosphere during the elections and to resolve any disputes through dialogue and the legal framework. They believe that Puntland's experience with direct elections can serve as a model for democratic expansion throughout Somalia's government levels. The partners reaffirm their commitment to supporting Somalia's democratization process.

Former Somali President Mohamed Abdullahi Farmaajo expressed his appreciation for the people and government of Puntland regarding their steadfast commitment to the execution of Local Council elections.

Rep. Ilhan Omar congratulates the people of Puntland on their historic elections. Commending the commitment to democracy witnessed during her visit to Qardho, she urges all involved to ensure a peaceful and fair election process. Omar expresses gratitude to the Puntland President for his leadership;

I want to congratulate the people of Puntland and Somalia on their historic elections this week. When I was in Qardo at the end of last year, I was touched by people’s hope for the future and commitment to democracy. I urge all involved to ensure a peaceful and fair election process. I want to thank the Puntland President for his commitment and leadership in ensuring elections weren’t just talked about but actually happened. These elections will be the most significant step towards cultivating democracy in Somalia. And it’s incredible to see Puntland lead the charge in this way.

— Ilhan Omar, Rep. Omar Statement on Elections in Puntland, Somalia, https://omar.house.gov/media/press-releases/rep-omar-statement-elections-puntland-somalia

Representative Adam Smith issued the following statement regarding the district council elections taking place in Puntland;

I look forward to seeing the historic direct elections take place in Puntland this week. I applaud the people of Puntland for their dedication to advancing their democratic commitments. The elections represent positive progress for reaching democratic aspirations in Puntland, other parts of Somalia, and the entire region and I encourage all stakeholders to ensure a peaceful election process. I am proud to represent a vibrant Somali community in the Ninth District and I commend their commitment to making these direct elections possible.

— Adam Smith, Rep. Smith Statement on Elections in Puntland, https://adamsmith.house.gov/news/press-releases/rep-smith-statement-elections-puntland

Puntland traditional leaders including Boqor Burhan Boqor Muse and Ugas Hassan Ugas Yasin have welcomed the exercise, calling it a type of election that people have anticipated for so long time. The election also revokes things like clan quotas, an effort that elders spearheaded since the state's establishment, added by elders.
