= Vice President of Puntland =

Second-highest political office Puntland

- Madaxweyne Ku-xigeenka Dawladda Puntland
- Flag of Puntland

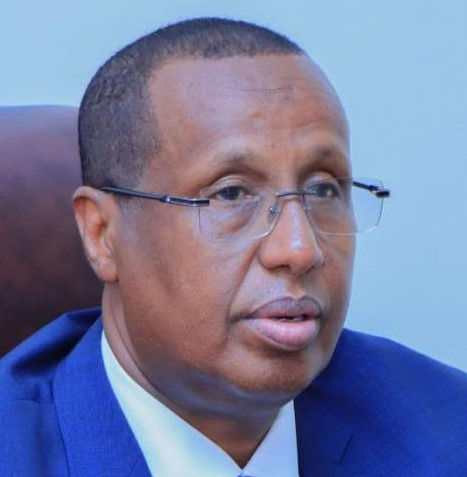
- Incumbent; Ilyas Osman Lugatoor since January 08, 2024
- Status: His Excellency
- Abbreviation: VPOP
- Residence: Presidential Palace, Garowe
- Appointer: Puntland Parliament
- Term length: 5 years
- Constituting instrument: Constitution of Puntland
- Formation: August 1, 1998
- First holder: Mohamed Abdi Hashi
- Salary: US$80,000
- Website: plstate.so

The vice president of Puntland (VPOP) serves as the secondary head of the Government of Puntland after the President of Puntland. The office was established following the formation of Puntland on 1 August 1998, and is held by five officials, and two interim vice presidents, elected by the Parliament of Puntland. The first vice president was Mohamed Abdi Hashi. Following the 2024 Vice Presidential Election, Ilyas Osman Lugator was elected in January 2024.

== Establishment and history ==
In 1998, the self-autonomous Puntland State declared its autonomy, and Abdullahi Yusuf Ahmed was chosen as the first president, with Mohamed Abdi Hashi serving as his vice president. Puntland had a single-chamber quasi-legislature called the Council of Elders. Ahmed served in the office of the president from July 23, 1998, to June 30, 2001.

== List of vice presidents ==
No.	Portrait	Name	Party	Election	President
1		Mohamed Abdi Hashi	Independent	1998	Abdullahi Yusuf Ahmed
—		Ahmed Mohamoud Gunle	Independent	2001	Jama Ali Jama
2		Mohamed Ali Yusuf	Independent	2004	Mohamed Abdi Hashi
3		Hassan Dahir Afqurac	Independent	2005	Mohamud Muse Hersi
4		Abdisamad Ali Shire	Horseed	2009	Abdirahman Farole
5		Abdihakim Abdullahi Haji Omar	Independent	2014	Abdiweli Gaas
6		Ahmed Elmi Osman	Kaah	2019	Said Abdullahi Deni
7		Ilyas Osman Lugator	Kaah	2024	Said Abdullahi Deni
