= Abdirashid Yusuf Jibril =

Vice President of Northeastern State and former speaker of Puntland parliament

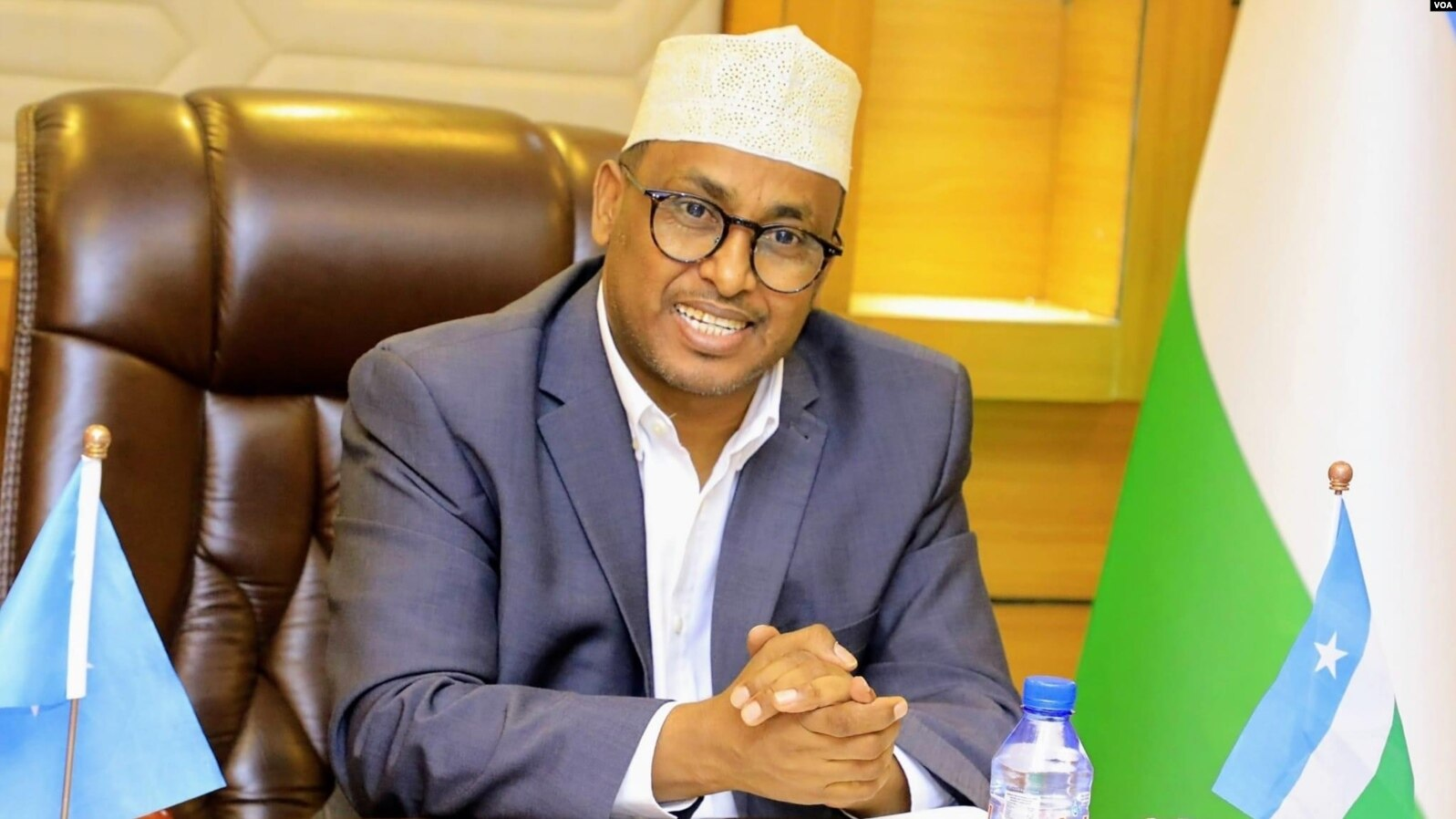

9th Speaker of the House of Representatives of Puntland
- In office 14 November 2019 – 4 January 2024
- Appointed by: 5th Parliament of Puntland
- President: Said Abdullahi Deni
- Vice President: Ahmed Elmi Osman
- Preceded by: Abdihakim Mohamed Ahmed
- Succeeded by: Abdirizak Ahmed Said
- Constituency: Badhan, Sanaag

Chair of the 6th Parliament of Puntland
- Ranking Member of the Family Committee
- In office 4 January 2024 – 15 July 2025

Vice President of the North Eastern State of Somalia
- Incumbent
- Assumed office 30 August 2025
- President: Abdikhadir Ahmed Aw-Ali

Personal details
- Born: Burao, Togdheer

Abdirashid Yusuf Jibril (Somali: Cabdirashid Yuusuf Jibriil, Turkish: Abdiraşid Yusuf Cibril, Arabic: عبد الرشيد يوسف جبريل) is a Somali politician, who served as the 9th Speaker of the Puntland House of Representatives from 2019 to 2024, and is currently the Vice President of the North Eastern State of Somalia.

== Early life and personal background ==
Abdirashid hails from the Warsangali sub-clan of Harti, a branch of the Darod. In 1991, Abdirashid fled the Somali Civil War from his birthplace of Burao, the capital of Togdheer. By the early 2010s, Abdirashid was publicly known in Somali media as an abwaan (poet).

=== Family ===
On 26 August 2016, Abdirashid married Faiza Abdirisak Nur ("Cirfe") in Galkayo at the Al-Jaziira Hotel, an event covered by Somali outlets and noted with public congratulations.

== Puntland political career ==
On 8 January 2014, following the election of President Abdiweli Mohamed Ali (Gaas), Abdirashid joined the Puntland administration and by May 2014 was serving as the Presidency’s Director of Communications (Information, Awareness, Culture & Heritage). From July 2016 to November 2017, as director he undertook official visits and security consultations in Sanaag and Haylan—including Badhan and areas near Ceerigaabo—and helped launch internal security infrastructure by laying foundations for police posts at Hadaaftimo and Yubbe. On 14 November 2019, Abdirashid was elected Speaker of the Puntland House of Representatives, winning in the second round of voting. On 18–19 December 2023, following a leadership agreement in Garowe, Abdirashid transferred procedural registers and records to the Vetting and Conflict Resolution Committee to facilitate the forthcoming selection process for legislators. On 4 January 2024, the newly seated assembly elected Abdirizak Ahmed Said as Speaker; Abdirashid’s term as the 9th Speaker concluded with this vote.

== Affiliations with SSC-Khatumo / Northeastern State ==
In early July 2025, Somali outlets reported that Abdirashid traveled to El Buh with armed men as part of a plan to mobilize delegates from Sanaag to attend an SSC-Khatumo conference in Las Anod. On 13 July 2025, the Puntland Attorney General ordered Abdirashid’s arrest; on 15 July 2025 the House voted to expel him from his seat (38 in favor, 1 against, 4 abstentions). On 30 August 2025, Abdirashid was sworn in as Vice President of the North Eastern State of Somalia alongside President Abdikhadir Ahmed Aw-Ali.
