= 2024 Puntland presidential election =

- 8 January 2024

66 members of the House of Representatives 45 votes needed to win
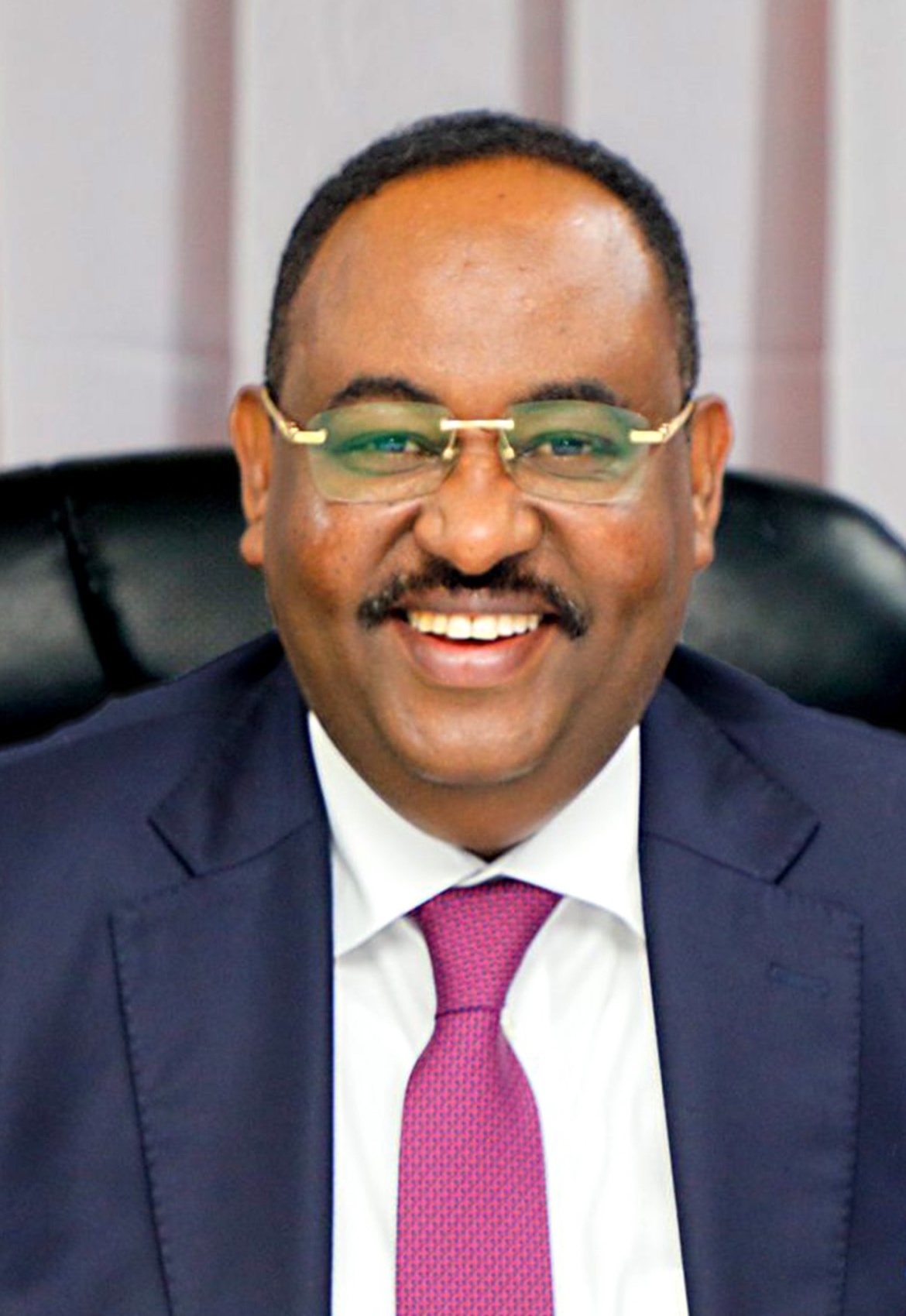

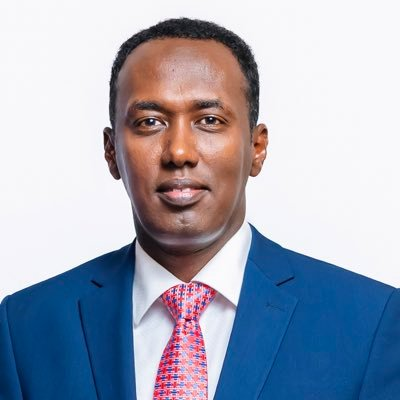
Candidate	Said Abdullahi Deni	Guled Salah Barre
Party	Kaah	Independent
Electoral vote	45	21
President before election
Said Abdullahi Deni
Kaah
Elected President
Said Abdullahi Deni
Kaah

Indirect presidential elections were held in Puntland on 8 January 2024. The president was elected by 66 members of the House of Representatives in the administrative capital Garoowe and were the fifth election since the state's formation in 1998. Preceding the elections, a new Parliament Speaker and Deputy Speaker was held on 4 January 2024, by the 6th Parliament of Puntland. The pool of candidates comprises officials from the current Puntland administration, former government ministers, and notable local entrepreneurs.

== Background ==
The elections followed deadly clashes triggered by proposed changes to the electoral system by current leader Said Abdullahi Deni. Deni had sought to implement direct elections for the presidency. However, in November 2023 the proposal was abandoned as armed opposition politicians and clan elders opposed it, underscoring the ongoing complexities surrounding democratic processes in Puntland.

UN Special Representative Catriona Laing acknowledged the state's leaders for their notable efforts in engaging diverse groups. Laing urged President Deni to extend this outreach beyond opposition leaders, elders, and clan representatives, emphasizing the inclusion of youth, women, and scholars. The objective is to build consensus and ensure a peaceful electoral process during the upcoming parliamentary and presidential elections, slated for February 2024, as proposed by the Puntland Electoral Commission (PEC).

Laing commended Puntland for its successful implementation of one-person, one-vote elections in May 2023, applauding the region as an "island of stability" and a democratic trailblazer, particularly through its effective district-level elections. She reaffirmed the United Nations' dedication to collaborating with the Puntland government and its people, working towards the realization of peaceful and inclusive parliamentary and presidential elections that gain recognition from all stakeholders.

=== Federal Government—Puntland relations ===
Catriona Laing, the UN Secretary-General's Special Representative for Somalia, visited Puntland. She discussed crucial issues with Puntland's leaders, political figures, and civil society representatives, covering topics like the state's ties with the Federal Government of Somalia.

In the Puntland election, candidates hold varying perspectives on federalism and the relationship with the Mogadishu government. Some advocate for defending Puntland's constitutional rights as a federal member state of Somalia, while others propose engagement in dialogues. the complex dynamics surrounding Puntland's position within the federal structure and its interactions with the central government in Mogadishu.

=== SSC-Khatumo ===
With the crisis in Las Anod, UN Special Representative Catriona Laing highlighted the displacement of approximately 280,000 people due to the conflict that erupted in February. The unrest resulted in substantial loss of lives and the disruption of livelihoods for those affected.

Traditional elders from SSC-Khatumo have expressed support for holding Puntland's presidential elections on 8 January 2024. Notably, Puntland faces sharp differences between the ruling party, led by President Said Abdullahi Deni, and the opposition, with contrasting preferences for the election dates—January or February. SSC traditional elders advocate for the 8 January date and emphasize the need for the Puntland Electoral Commission (PEC) to conduct parliamentary polls within 12 months of the presidential elections. They also call for voting through the one-person-one-vote system.

The political landscape is further influenced by the ongoing SSC-Khatumo saga, impacting discussions about their future relationship with Puntland, even after their recent departure. Representatives from Sool, Sanaag, and Ayn in the 6th Parliament of Puntland contribute to the ongoing dialogue about SSC-Khatumo's position within the region.

On 24 December 2023, Deputy Chairman of Puntland Supreme Court, Ahmed Sheikh Omar Hassan, from SSC-KHATUMO, issued a personal legal opinion on SSC's exit, stating it lacks required legal procedures. Recommends Puntland proceed with elections, consider postponement, and designates sitting SSC MPs as temporary representatives in Puntland parliament until a resolution is reached.

== Candidates ==
The presidential election was widely regarded as one of the most challenging contests since the establishment of Puntland. Notable candidates included:

- Abshir Omar Huruse, the former Minister of Foreign Affairs who resigned to participate.
- Abdiweli Ali Gaas, the preceding president.
- Hassan Shire Abgal, a former Minister of Finance.
- Ahmed Isse Awad, former Somali Minister of Foreign Affairs.
- Gullied Salah Barre, former Puntland Minister of Environmental and Chairman of the Transitional Puntland Electoral Committee (TPEC)

== Results ==
On January 8, 2024, Said Abdullahi Deni, the incumbent President of Puntland, was re-elected following an election held in Garowe, the capital of Puntland. Deni emerged victorious in the third round of the election, securing 45 votes, while Guled Salah Barre, the remaining candidate, received 21 votes. Deni became the first president of Puntland to be re-elected, and he held office for another five-year term.

Candidate	Party	First round		Second round		Third round	
Candidate	Party	Votes	%	Votes	%	Votes	%
Said Abdullahi Deni	Kaah	35	53.03	40	60.61	45	68.18
Guled Salah Barre	Independent	9	13.64	17	25.76	21	31.82
Abshir Omar Huruse	Mideeye	8	12.12	9	13.64		
Hassan Shire Abgal	Kaah	5	7.58				
Ahmed Isse Awad	Independent	4	6.06				
Asad Osman Abdullahi	Mideeye	3	4.55				
Mohamed Abdirahman Farole	Horseed	2	3.03				
Total		66	100.00	66	100.00	66	100.00
Source: Caasimada, Caasimada Garowe Online

== Reactions ==
=== International community ===
UN: UNSOM – Somalia's international partners commend the peaceful conclusion of Puntland's presidential election on 8 January 2024. Acknowledging the efforts of political and electoral stakeholders, they urge all parties to resolve disputes peacefully through legal means. Emphasizing the importance of greater participation of women and youth in future processes, international partners reaffirm their commitment to Somalia's democratic governance and progress toward fair, transparent and direct elections.

African Union (ATMIS), Belgium, Denmark, Djibouti, Ethiopia, European Union EU Delegation, Finland, Germany, Intergovernmental Authority on Development (IGAD), Ireland, Italy, Kingdom of Saudi Arabia (KSA), League of Arab States (LAS), Norway, Organisation of Islamic Cooperation (OIC), Poland, Qatar, Russian Federation, Sweden, Switzerland, Turkey, Uganda, United Arab Emirates (UAE), United Kingdom, United States, and United Nations.

— (UNSOM)
