= 2019 Puntland presidential election =

- January 8, 2019

66 MPs of the House of Representatives 45 votes needed to win
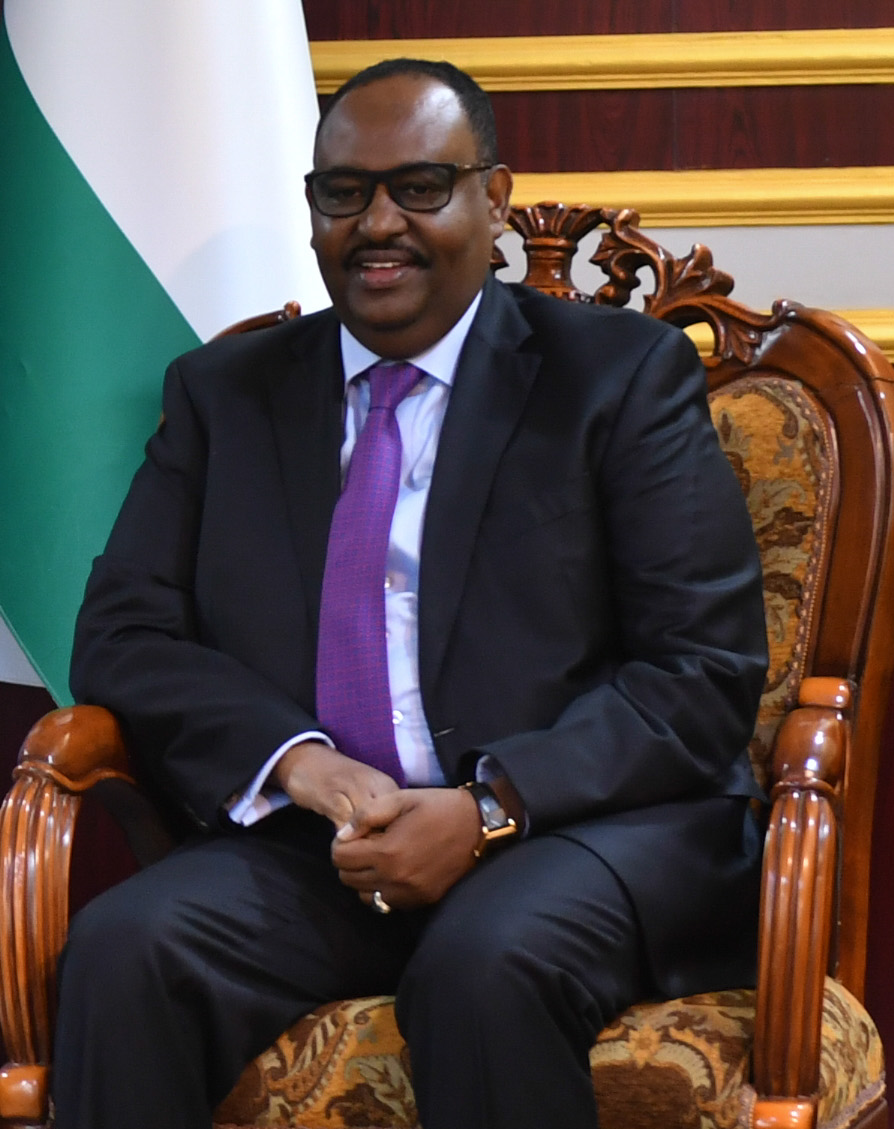

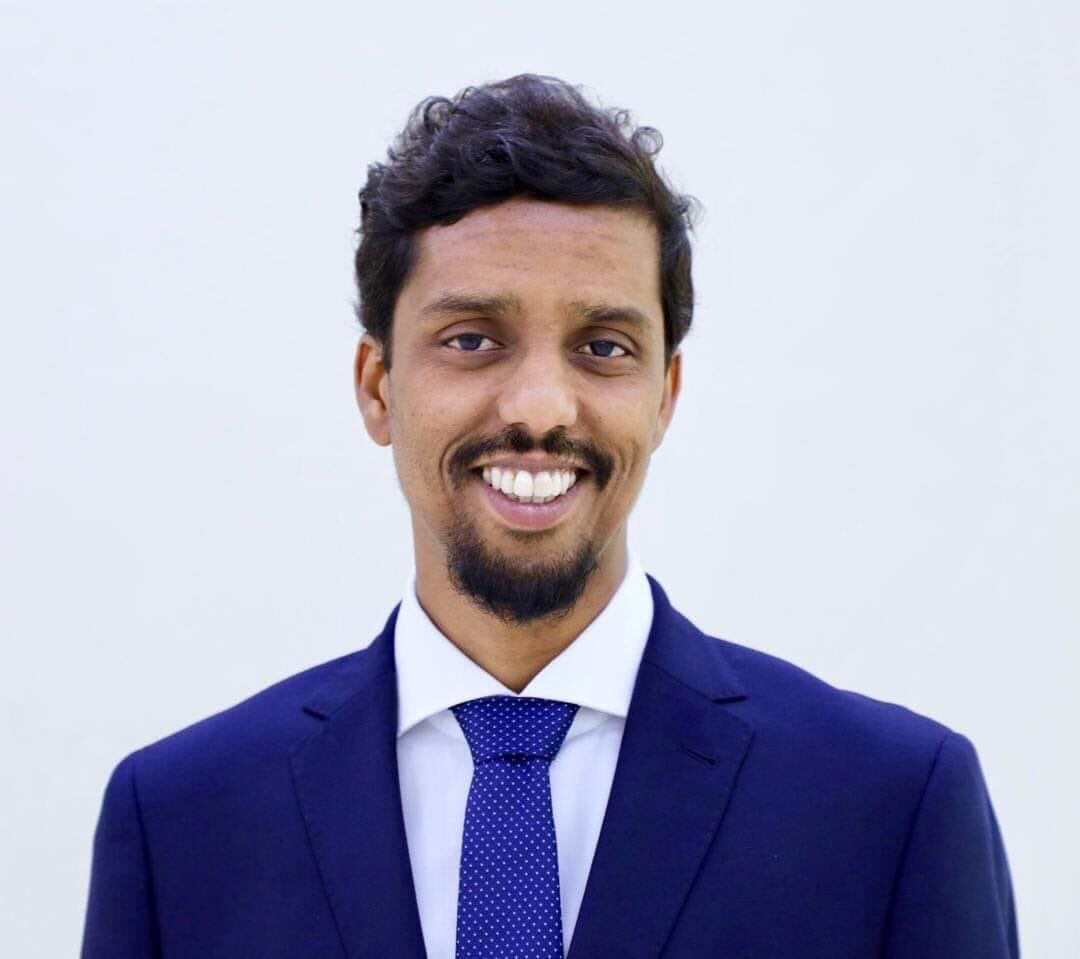
Candidate	Said Abdullahi Deni	Asad Osman Abdullahi
Party	Kaah	Mideeye
Electoral vote	35	31
President before election
Abdiweli Gaas
UDAD
Elected President
Said Abdullahi Deni
Kaah

The 2019 Puntland presidential election was held on 8 January 2019 in Garowe, the administrative capital of the autonomous Puntland state of Somalia. The fourth such vote to be held in the state since its establishment 1998, it followed the election of a new Parliament Speaker and Deputy Speakers on January 04, 2019 by the 66-seat bicameral legislature. Candidates included officials from the incumbent Puntland administration, former government ministers and prominent local entrepreneurs. The ballot saw the election of former somali minister of planning Said Abdullahi Deni as the sixth president of Puntland, narrowly defeating General Asad Osman Abdullahi. Parliament of Puntland concurrently elected Ahmed Elmi Osman as Puntland's new vice president in place of Abdihakim Abdullahi Haji Omar.

== Background ==
2019 Puntland presidential election, with incumbent Abdiweli Gaas in a tight race, holds significant implications for both regional and federal politics in Somalia. The outcome will signal either a continuation of tensions between federal member states and the federal government or a potential shift towards cooperation. This election was served a crucial precursor to the 2022 federal elections, that was shaped Somalia's political crisis 2022.

== Campaigns ==
On January 6, 2019, the Puntland House of Representatives Vetting Committee released the final list of candidates competing in the election on January 8, 2019. According to a press release issued by the Vetting Committee, 21 candidates had registered to compete for the position of President, while 11 others were competing for the position of Vice President. This list was the last one officially registered, meeting all requirements, and the candidates were scheduled to address the House of Representatives before the election.

The highly watched election was scheduled to be held on the Tuesday of that week, with heavy security in place in the administrative capital of Garowe and the headquarters of the Puntland.

== Candidates ==
Major candidates were considered to be aligned with the former President of Puntland, Abdirahman Faroole, who at the time was a member of the upper house of the Somali Parliament and vehemently opposed the incumbent President, Abdiweli Gaas.

- Farah Ali Shire, emerged as one of the most prominent candidates for the Puntland presidential election. He served as the finance minister of Puntland during Abdirahman Faroole's presidency.
- Said Abdullahi Deni, a former member of the Somali parliament and a business associate of Senator Farole, emerged as one of the most prominent candidates for change. Additionally, he served as the Planning Minister of Somalia during the presidency of Hassan Sheikh Mohamud.
- Khalif Isse Mudan, was the former Puntland minister of security and DDR during presidency of Abdirahman Farole.
- Ali Isse Abdi, was enjoyed significant support from Senator Abdirahman Farole, and his candidacy had a substantial impact on the voting process. This was because most members of parliament in Puntland were elected based on the clan system.
- Asad Osman Abdullahi, the young Bridget general who recently resigned from the command of PSF to run for the presidency of Puntland, it was expected he was a runner-up president elected Said Deni.

== Results ==
=== President ===
Said Abdullahi Deni emerged as the new president of puntland, defeating Asad Osman Abdullahi in the final round. Deni secured 35 votes from the 66 members of the Puntland House of Representatives, while Asad Diano received 31 votes. Incumbent president Abdiweli Gaas was eliminated in the first round after receiving only 8 votes.

Candidate	First round		Second round		Third round	
Candidate	Votes	%	Votes	%	Votes	%
Said Abdullahi Deni	20	30.77	29	43.94	35	53.03
Asad Osman Abdullahi	17	26.15	30	45.45	31	46.97
Farah Ali Shire	9	13.85	7	10.61		
Abdiweli Gaas	8	12.31				
Mohamoud Khalif Jabiye	7	10.77				
Ali Haji Warsame	1	1.54				
Ali Isse Abdi	1	1.54				
Mohammed Said Hersi Morgan	1	1.54				
Mohammed Abdullahi Hussain	1	1.54				
Mohamed Ahmed Gar	0	0.00				
Ali Abdi Aware	0	0.00				
Khalif Isse Mudan	0	0.00				
Dahir Mire Jibril	0	0.00				
Adan Mohamed Isse Gadale	0	0.00				
Mohamed Ali Isman	0	0.00				
Abdisamad Gallan	0	0.00				
Said Mohamed Hersy	0	0.00				
Mohamed Ahmed Shaale	0	0.00				
Abdi Farah Said Juha	0	0.00				
Mahamud Hasan Khalif	0	0.00				
Abdikadir Yasin Abdi	0	0.00				
Total	65	100.00	66	100.00	66	100.00
Source: Allbanaadir, Garowe Online

=== Vice president ===
Ahmed Elmi Osman (Karaash) was elected as the vice president of puntland after he defeated Abdi Ibrahim Warsame Qawdhan in the third round. Karaash received 47 votes from 66 members of the Puntland House of Representatives, while Abdi Qawdhan was given 19 votes. In the first round, former vice president Abdihakim Amey was eliminated after receiving only 8 votes.

Candidate	First round		Second round		Third round	
Candidate	Votes	%	Votes	%	Votes	%
Ahmed Elmi Osman	24	36.36	34	51.52	47	71.21
Abdi Ibrahim Warsame	15	22.73	23	34.85	19	28.79
Abdullahi Ali Hersi (Tima-ade)	12	18.18	9	13.64		
Abdihakim Haji Omar Amey	11	16.67				
Abdullahi Sheikh Mohamed	1	1.52				
Mohamoud Ahmed Hassan (Dhagaweyne)	1	1.52				
Ahmed Mohamed Sadiq (Eenow)	0	0.00				
Ahmed Cali Mohamed (Dhaga-ade)	0	0.00				
Abdirahman Guled Ali	1	1.52				
Abdisalam Mohamud Salwe	0	0.00				
Abdikarim Mohamed Hassan (Gaaleef)	1	1.52				
Total	66	100.00	66	100.00	66	100.00
Source: Puntland Post, All-Sanaag, Daljir Media

== Reactions ==
In the aftermath of the Puntland presidential election, the Officer-in-Charge of the United Nations Assistance Mission in Somalia and Deputy Special Representative of the UN Secretary-General for Somalia, Raisedon Zenenga extended congratulations to Said Abdullahi Deni and Ahmed Elmi Osman for their respective victories as President and Vice-President of Puntland.

Mr. Zenenga also commended Puntland’s electoral commission for organizing and executing a transparent, peaceful, free, and fair electoral process. He expressed anticipation in working closely with President Deni's administration and praised outgoing President Abdiweli Mohamed Ali ‘Gaas’ and his administration for facilitating a peaceful transfer of power and creating conditions conducive to the success of the electoral process.
