= Ministry of Civil Aviation and Airport Authority =

Puntland government Ministry of Civil Aviation and Airports

- Wasaaradda Duulista iyo Garoomada ee Dawladda Puntland وزارة الطيران المدني والمطارات في بونتلاند

Agency overview
- Formed: 23 August 1998
- Jurisdiction: Government of Puntland
- Headquarters: Garowe, Puntland
- Minister responsible: Abdullahi Bile Noor
- Website: https://mocaa.pl.so/

The Puntland Ministry of Civil Aviation and Airport Authority MoCAA (Somali: Wasaaradda Duulista iyo Garoomada ee Dawladda Puntland) is government body responsible for Civil Aviation and Airport Authorities. The ministry was one of the first formed ministries on 23 August 1998 as one of the first nine ministries following the establishment of the Puntland government. The Aviation ministry was headed by Abdullahi Bile Noor.

== List of ministers ==
- Ahmed Elmi Osman, 2009–?.
- Hassan Haji Said, 2014–2017.
- Ahmed Elmi Osman, 2017–2019.
- Ilyas Osman Lugator, 2019–2024.
- Abdullahi Bile Noor, 2024–present.
