= 2005 Puntland presidential election =

← 2001	January 8, 2005	2009 →

66 MPs of the House of Representatives 45 votes needed to win
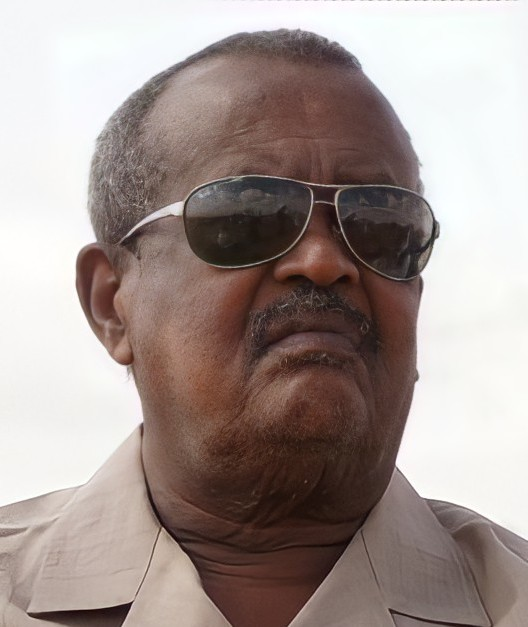

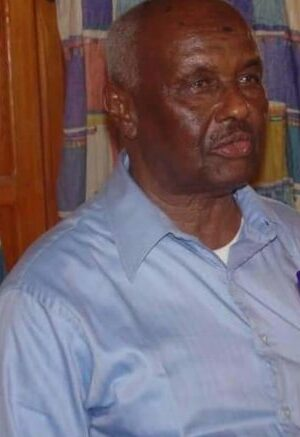
Candidate	Mohamud Muse Hersi	Mohamed Abdi Hashi
Party	Independent	Independent
Electoral vote	35	30
President before election
Mohamed Abdi Hashi
Acting (interim)
Elected President
Adde Muse
Independent

The 2005 Puntland presidential election was held on 8 January 2005 in Garowe, the administrative capital of the autonomous Puntland state of Somalia. The first such vote to be held in the state since its establishment 1998, it followed the election of a new Parliament Speaker and Deputy Speakers on January 04, 2005 by the 66-seat unicameral legislature. Candidates included officials from the incumbent Puntland administration, former government ministers and prominent local entrepreneurs. The ballot saw the election of Military leader General Adde Muse as the third president of Puntland, narrowly defeating Mohamed Abdi Hashi. Parliament of Puntland concurrently elected Hassan Dahir Afqurac as Puntland's new vice president in place of Mohamed Ali Yusuf.

== Background ==
In July 2001, the Chief Justice of Puntland, Yusuf Haji Nur declared himself the acting President of Puntland following the expiration of Ahmed's presidential term. However, Abdullahi Yusuf Ahmed disputed Nur's claim and maintained that he was the rightful President, Yusuf Haji Nur served as the interim President starting from July 1, 2001 - November 14, 2001, in the office of the president as interim.

In November 2001, Abdullahi Yusuf Ahmed, the first president of Puntland, was forcibly removed from the capital by the opposition after he refused to leave office despite his term expiring. The opposition convened a council and elected Jama Ali Jama as the new president. Yusuf Haji Nur, who had previously declared himself acting president, handed over the position to the newly elected president, Jama Ali Jama. This power struggle led to a two-year civil war in Puntland. Jama assumed the role of acting president on November 14, 2001, but his tenure was short-lived, lasting only six days until November 21, 2001.

In 2003, Mohamud Muse Hersi 'Adde', a former Lieutenant general, organized a militia group consisting primarily of members from the Osman Mohamoud sub-clan of Majeerteen. They established a base in El Afweyn, Somaliland, General Adde's forces attempted two unsuccessful attacks on Puntland from their base in El Afweyn. In response to the escalating conflict, traditional elders from Puntland intervened and facilitated a peace agreement between General Adde Muse and Abdullahi Yusuf Ahmed.

The peace agreement, signed in May 2003, led to a collaboration between the two leaders, with their forces combining and power being shared between them, Ahmed then regained the presidency and served his second term from 2003, until October 14, 2004.

=== Somali Federal elections ===
After Yusuf's election as President of the Transitional Federal Government (TFG) in October, the Vice President at that time, Mohamed Abdi Hashi, took over the presidency of Puntland. His interim term as President lasted from October 14, 2004, to January 8, 2005.

== Candidates ==
- Abdirahman Farole, former minister of finance
- Mohamed Abdi Hashi, incumbent president and the first vice president of Puntland
- Mohamud Muse Hersi, Late General and Military leader.
- Abshir Muse Said a new candidate

== Results ==
General Mohamud Muse Hersi emerged victorious as the President of Puntland after three rounds of voting. The final round pitted General Adde Muse against Mohamed Abdi Hashi of votes for each round is as follows:

Candidate	First round		Second round		Third round	
Candidate	Votes	%	Votes	%	Votes	%
Mohamed Abdi Hashi	27	41.54	29	44.62	30	46.15
Mohamud Muse Hersi	18	27.69	21	32.31	35	53.85
Abdirahman Mohamed Farole	15	23.08	15	23.08		
Abshir Musa Said	5	7.69				
Total	65	100.00	65	100.00	65	100.00
Source: African Elections Database

== Reactions ==
The international community and local residents welcomed the free and fair elections held in Garowe.

As a result, Gen. Adde Muse secured the presidency, succeeding his runner-up Mohamed Abdi Hashi, who had replaced Abdullahi Yusuf Ahmed after assuming the President of Somalia . The position of Vice President of Puntland was won by Hassan Dahir Afqurac.

The elected president, Adde Musa, is expected to appoint the council of cabinet within the next 45 days according to the Puntland constitution.
