= Guled Salah Barre =

Somali politician

His Excellency Dr. Guled Salah Barre
- Guuleed Saalax Barre
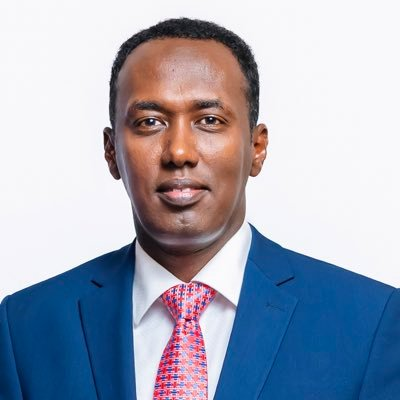

Puntland Minister of Environment and Climate Change
- In office 28 January 2014 – 16 June 2015

Director of SIDRA
- In office 2017–2019

Chairman of TPEC
- In office 2019–2022

Personal details
- Born: 1 September 1984 (age 42) Mogadishu, Somali Democratic Republic
- Education: University for Peace (PhD); Omdurman Islamic University (BA)
- Website: guledsalah.so.

Dr. Gulleid Salah Barre (Somali: Guuleed Saalax Barre) is a Somali politician who served as the chairman of the Transitional Puntland Electoral Committee from 2019 to 2022 and as the Puntland Minister of Environment and Climate Change from 28 January 2014 to 2016. He is the founder and first director of the research institute SIDRA and has worked with the UNDP and UNFPA. He also became a professor and vice president at the University of East Africa in Garowe.

== Early life and education ==
Gulled Salah Barre was born in Mogadishu on 1 September 1984.

Barre graduated from Al-Waha Secondary School and holds a Ph.D. from the United Nations University for Peace, focusing on the Federalism in Somalia, he earned a master's degree in Business Development (MBA - International Business) from Amity University, Mumbai and a bachelor's degree in statistics from Omdurman University.

== Career ==
Barre served as the chairman of the Transitional Puntland Electoral Commission (TPEC) and prior took on the role of Puntland Minister of Environment and Climate Change from 28 January 2014 to 16 June 2015. He also the founder and first director of the research institute SIDRA.

Barre collaborated with international organizations such as the United Nations Development Programme and the United Nations Population Fund, he assumed responsibilities as a professor and vice president at the East Africa University in Garowe.

=== 2024 presidential election ===
Barre announced his candidacy for the president of the Puntland in December 2023. He considered accountability and justice for his top priority. In the Puntland presidential candidates debate.

On 8 January 2024, Barre was defeated by Said Abdullahi Deni as the president of the Puntland. The election was held in Garowe and was elected by 6th Parliament of Puntland after three rounds of voting, as he lost the ballot 21 to 45 which equivalent 31.82% to 68.18%. He received congratulatory messages from the International community.

== Writings ==
- Barre, Guled Salah (21 October 2024). "Islam, Somali Culture and Federalism: An Integrated Perspective". 50 Shades of Federalism.
- Barre, Guled Salah (6 March 2022). "Puntland in transition to democracy: challenges and the way forward". Middle East Monitor.
