= Mohamed Abdi Hashi =

First Vice President of Puntland from 1998 to 2004

Mohamed Abdi Hashi محمد عبدي هاشي
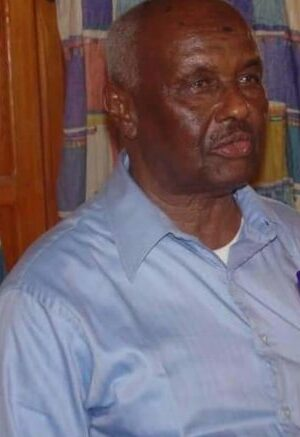

2nd President of Puntland
- Acting
- In office 10 October 2004 – 8 January 2005
- Vice President: Mohamed Ali Yusuf
- Preceded by: Abdullahi Yusuf Ahmed
- Succeeded by: Mohamud Muse Hersi

1st Vice President of Puntland
- In office 1 August 1998 – September 2004
- President: Abdullahi Yusuf Ahmed
- Succeeded by: Mohamed Ali Yusuf

Personal details
- Died: 12 July 2020 Nairobi, Kenya
- Children: Abdirahman Mohamed Abdi Hashi

Mohamed Abdi Hashi (Somali: Maxamed Cabdi Xaashi, Arabic: محمد عبدي هاشي; died 12 July 2020) was the first Vice President of Puntland during Abdullahi Yusuf Ahmed presidency from 1 August 1998 to 10 October 2004. Later was the acting President of Puntland from 10 October 2004 until 8 January 2005.

Hashi was the chairman of USP during the 1990s. He hails from the Qayaad subclan of the larger clan Dhulbahante.

He died COVID-19 in the Kenyan capital of Nairobi on 12 July 2020. On 15 July he was buried in Garowe.

== Biography ==
Mahamed Abdi is from the Qayaad branch of the Dhulbahante clan.

Mahamed Abdi was born in the rural community of Hargaga, west of Las Anod in the Sool region.

A son, Abdirahman Mohamed Abdi Hashi, was born in September 1955.

=== Political careers ===
He chaired the United Somali Party (USP), a political organization created in 1991.

In January 1993 he attended a Somali civil war reconciliation conference in Addis Ababa, Ethiopia.。

At the end of 1996, Mahamed Abdi and other anti-Somaliland factions with the support of the diaspora held a Dhulbahante clan meeting in Bo'ame, where a resolution was passed to unite the Halti, consisting of the Dhulbahante clan and others. This was one of the triggers for the later founding of Puntland.

=== Vice President Puntland to Interim President ===
In 1998, when Puntland was founded, Abdullahi Yusuf Ahmed became president.

According to a pre-election agreement, the president was to come from the Majeerteen clan, the vice president from the Dulbahante clan, and the speaker of the assembly from the Warsangali clan. The vice presidency was to be contested among the branches of the Dulbahante clan, with Mahamed Abdi, Ahmed Abdi Mohamed, and Yasin Ali Abdulle Tamat, of which Mahamed Abdi became vice president.

Mahamed Abdi would serve as vice president (and interim president) for the next six-plus years, often at odds with the power-hungry President Yusuf.

Meanwhile, to end the Somali Civil War, other countries supported the reconstruction of the central government of Somalia, and the Transitional Federal Government of Somalia was established as a preparatory body. Mahamed Abdi became president of Puntland as a bridge until the next Puntland presidential elections.

Note that Abdullahi Yusuf was ousted from the presidency once in 2001, and for a few months, people such as Yusuf Haji Nur and Jama Ali Jama took over as president, so Mahamed Abdi is formally the fifth president of Puntland. However, Yusuf Haji Nur and Jama Ali Jama were soon ousted militarily, and Yusuf became president again, so Mahamed Abdi is sometimes described as the “second president of Puntland." On the other hand, he is sometimes referred to as the interim president because of his elevated position from vice president until the next presidential election.

At the end of October 2004, fighting broke out between Puntland and neighboring Somaliland to the west. In response, President Mahamed Abdi sent a letter to President Abdullahi Yusuf Ahmed of the Transitional Federal Government of Somalia saying that the situation was “very dangerous.”

On January 8, 2005, Mahamed Abdi ran for President of Puntland, but the parliamentary vote resulted in 30 votes for Mahamed Abdi and 35 votes for Mohamud Muse Hersi, and Mahamed Muse Hersi was elected President of Puntland.

=== Thereafter ===
In April 2019, Mahamed Abdi received a visit from Puntland President Said Abdullahi Deni at his home in Nairobi, Kenya.

Mahamed Abdi fell ill in Nairobi, Kenya, and died shortly thereafter on July 12, 2020. Mahamed Abdi was buried in Garowe, the capital of Puntland.。

== Family ==
- Abdirahman Mohamed Abdi Hashi - Son. Former Minister of Fisheries and Marine Resources of the Federal Republic of Somalia.

Political offices
New office	Vice President of Puntland; 1998-2001	Succeeded by Ahmed Mohamoud Gunle; Ousted; Mohamed Ali Yusuf; Acting
Preceded by Abdullahi Yusuf Ahmed	President of Puntland; Acting; 2001–2004	Succeeded by Mohamud Muse Hersi
