= Puntland Electoral Commission =

Agency overview
- Formed: 2012
- Jurisdiction: Government of Puntland
- Employees: 350
- Website: pec.pl.so

The Puntland Electoral Commission (PEC) is a governmental body in the autonomous Puntland region in northeastern Somalia. Since 2012, it has been guiding the region's gradual shift from a parliament-based vote system to multi-party elections.

== List of chairmen ==
| No | Portrait | Name | Party | Term | Appointed by |
|---|---|---|---|---|---|
| 1 | | Mohamed Hassan Barre | Independent | 2009 | Abdirahman Farole |
| 2 | | Shuuqe | Independent | ?–2013 | Abdirahman Farole |
| 3 | | Ahmed Mohamed Kismayo | Independent | ?–2017 | Abdiweli Gaas |
| 4 | | Guled Salah Barre | Independent | 2020–2022 | Said Abdullahi Deni |
| 5 | | Abdirizak Ahmed Said | Kaah | 2022–2023 | Said Abdullahi Deni |
| 6 | | Fuad Abshir Adeer | Kaah | 2023–2024 | Said Abdullahi Deni |
| 7 | | Ahmed Mohamoud Omar | Kaah | 2024 | Said Abdullahi Deni |
