= 2021 Puntland municipal elections =

2021 Puntland municipal election
- 25 October 2021
Party
Kaah
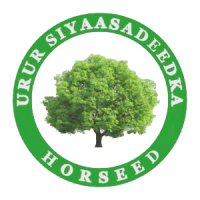
Horseed
Runta iyo Cadaaladda
Party
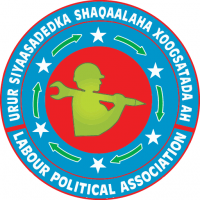
SXA
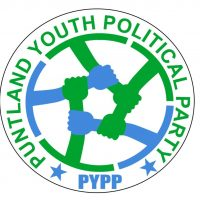
Dhalinyarada
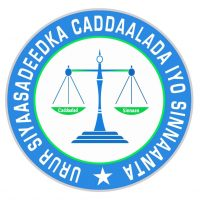
Caddaalada iyo Sinnaanta
Party
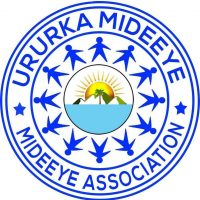
Mideeye
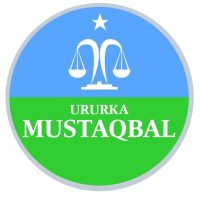
Mustaqbal
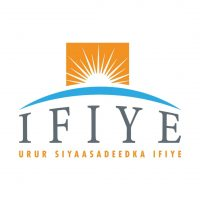
Ifiye

Municipal elections were held in Puntland, a state of Somalia, on October 25, 2021, with the preliminary elections in Qardho, Eyl and Ufayn electing councils for these three districts ahead of state-wide local council elections expected to take place in early 2022. The election was the first one under the principle of one man, one vote to be held in Somalia since 1969 and the state since its formation in 1998.

Candidates in district elections run and are nominated by political parties. The mayor and District Council are then selected internally by the Councils at the first special sitting of the new legislative session.

== Results ==
The Transitional Puntland Electoral Commission (TPEC) successfully concluded elections in three districts — Qardho, Eyl, and Ufeyn on October 26.

Out of 87 council seats, 23 women emerged victoriously. In Qardho, 16,722 votes were cast, 15,343 were valid, and 1,379 invalid. Out of 33 seats, 24 were won by males and nine were by females. In Eyl, 6,766 votes were cast — 5,406 votes were valid and 1,360 invalid. A total of 21 seats were won by males and six won by females. The Ufeyn district saw 5,366 votes cast, with 4,739 valid votes and 627 ballots were deemed invalid. Nineteen were won by males and eight won by females.

International partners congratulated the people of Puntland for leading the way toward instituting a system of universal suffrage elections across Somalia. Similar municipal elections will be held in the remaining districts in 2022.

=== Combined total ===
Party	Votes	%	Seats
Kaah	9,869	38.72	35
Mideeye	7,581	29.74	25
Caddaalada iyo Sinnaanta	6,299	24.71	20
Horseed	689	2.70	3
Runta iyo Cadaaladda	448	1.76	2
Mustaqbal	243	0.95	1
Ifiye	231	0.91	1
Shaqaalaha Xoogsatada Ah	97	0.38	0
Dhalinyarada	31	0.12	0
Total	25,488	100.00	87
Valid votes	25,488	88.33	
Invalid/blank votes	3,366	11.67	
Total votes	28,854	100.00	
Registered voters/turnout	46,839	61.60	
Source: PEC, PEC

=== Eyl ===
Party	Votes	%	Seats
Kaah	2,659	49.19	13
Mideeye	1,108	20.50	6
Caddaalada iyo Sinnaanta	854	15.80	4
Horseed	359	6.64	2
Runta iyo Cadaaladda	316	5.85	2
Shaqaalaha Xoogsatada Ah	55	1.02	0
Mustaqbal	41	0.76	0
Dhalinyarada	9	0.17	0
Ifiye	5	0.09	0
Total	5,406	100.00	27
Valid votes	5,406	79.90	
Invalid/blank votes	1,360	20.10	
Total votes	6,766	100.00	
Registered voters/turnout	11,470	58.99	
Source: TPEC

=== Qardho ===
Party	Votes	%	Seats
Kaah	5,469	35.64	12
Mideeye	5,173	33.72	11
Caddaalada iyo Sinnaanta	4,197	27.35	9
Ifiye	218	1.42	1
Horseed (political party)	150	0.98	0
Runta iyo Cadaaladda	85	0.55	0
Shaqaalaha Xoogsatada Ah	29	0.19	0
Dhalinyarada	12	0.08	0
Mustaqbal	10	0.07	0
Total	15,343	100.00	33
Valid votes	15,343	91.75	
Invalid/blank votes	1,379	8.25	
Total votes	16,722	100.00	
Registered voters/turnout	25,405	65.82	
Source: PEC

=== Ufeyn ===
Party	Votes	%	Seats
Kaah	1,741	36.74	10
Mideeye	1,300	27.43	8
Caddaalada iyo Sinnaanta	1,248	26.33	7
Mustaqbal	192	4.05	1
Horseed (political party)	180	3.80	1
Runta iyo Cadaaladda	47	0.99	0
Shaqaalaha Xoogsatada Ah	13	0.27	0
Dhalinyarada	10	0.21	0
Ifiye	8	0.17	0
Total	4,739	100.00	27
Valid votes	4,739	88.32	
Invalid/blank votes	627	11.68	
Total votes	5,366	100.00	
Registered voters/turnout	9,964	53.85	
Source: PEC
