= Asad Osman Abdullahi =

Chief of the Somali Police Force

- Asad Cismaan Cabdulaahi اسد عثمان عبدالله
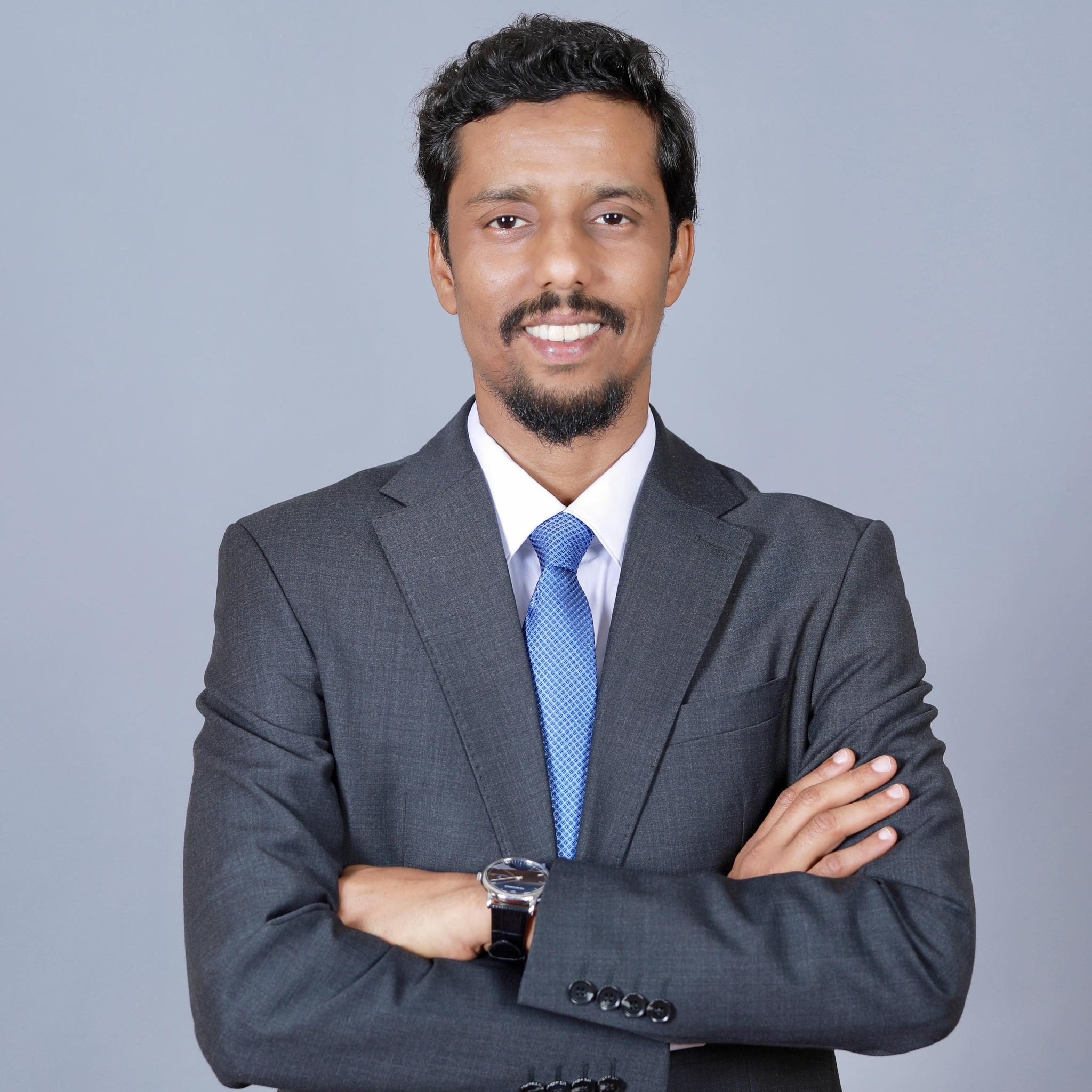
- Asad Osman

Chief commander of the Puntland Security Force
- In office 2010–2018

Chief of the Somali Police Force
- Incumbent
- Assumed office 26 September 2024

Personal details
- Born: 25 January 1983 (age 43) Geladin, now Ethiopia
- Party: Mideeye
- Education: Osmania University; Sikkim Manipal University

Military service
- Puntland Security Force; Somali Police Force: General

Asad Osman Abdullahi (Somali: Asad Cismaan Cabdulaahi, born January 25, 1983; Arabic: أسد عثمان عبد الله «ديانو»); is the chief of the Somali Police Force appointed on 26 September 2024, Osman Abdullahi was a founding member of the political party Mideeye and the former director general of the Puntland Security Force. He was also a Puntland presidential candidate in 2019 and 2024 elections.

== Personal life ==
Asad Osman Abdullahi was born on 25 January 1983, in Geladin situated in Somali Region in Ethiopia. He hails from the (Bah Dir) Osman Mohamoud sub-clan of the larger Majeerteen clan. His father, Osman Abdullahi Diano, was one of the founders of the Puntland Security Force during Abdullahi Yusuf's tenure in 1998.

== Education ==
Asad Osman Abdullahi was raised in Mogadishu and attended Qur'anic school in the capital before completing his secondary education at Omar Samatar Secondary School in Galkayo, Somalia. He pursued his post-secondary education in India and earned a first-class Bachelor of Science degree in Information Technology in 2003 from Osmania University. The following year, he earned a Master of Arts degree in International Relations from Sikkim Manipal University. Diano also studied administration and management, politics and strategy and military intelligence in addition to his regular courses. In 2011, Osman Abdullahi was nominated to participate in the International Visitor Leadership Program, the U.S. Department of State’s premier professional exchange program, aimed at current and emerging foreign leaders in a variety of fields. He is fluent in Somali, Arabic and English.

== Career ==
After returning from his studies abroad in India, Osman Abdullahi joined the Puntland Security Force as Director General and served for 14 years. He worked with the American government to combat terrorism in the Puntland state of Somalia and served as a consultant to the previous President of Puntland, Abdiweli Mahamed Ali Gaas. Diano ran for President of Puntland in 2019 and came in second place. In 2020, Asad Diano co-founded Mideeye political party. Osman Abdullahi also participated 2024 Puntland presidential election.

=== Somali Police Force ===
On September 26, 2024, the Cabinet of Somalia approved General Asad Osman Abdullahi as the new chief of the Somali Police Force. The decision was made during a weekly Thursday meeting held by the Cabinet of the Federal Government of Somalia.

On October 1, 2024, General Asad Osman Abdullahi officially became the head of the Somali Police Force in a ceremony at the police headquarters in Mogadishu. He took over the position from Major General Sulub Ahmed Firin.

Sulub Ahmed Firin had led the police for more than a year. After stepping down, he was given a new role as the Deputy Minister of Transport and Civil Aviation. The Minister of Internal Security, Abdullahi Sheikh Ismail Fartaag, officially transferred the leadership duties to Osman Abdullahi at the ceremony.

== See also ==
- Puntland Security Force
- Majerteen Sultanate
- Abdiwelli Mahamed Ali Gaas
