= President of Puntland =

Head of government and state of Puntland

- Madaxweynaha Dawladda Puntland
- Seal of the Puntland State House

- Flag of Puntland

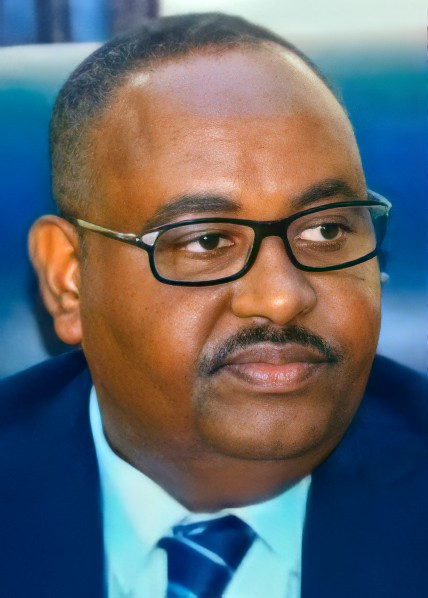
- Incumbent; Said Abdullahi Dani since 8 January 2019
- Government of Puntland
- Style: His Excellency; Honorable
- Abbreviation: POTPOS
- Reports to: The President
- Residence: Presidential Palace, Garowe
- Seat: Garowe
- Appointer: Parliament of Puntland
- Term length: Five years, renewable once
- Constituting instrument: Constitution of Puntland
- Formation: August 01,1998
- First holder: Abdullahi Yusuf Ahmed
- Deputy: Vice President of Puntland
- Website: plstate.so

The president of Puntland is the head of government and state of Puntland. The Presidency was elected by the House of Representatives of Puntland behind establishing the Puntland State in Somalia on August 1, 1998.

== History and establishment ==
In 1998, the state of Puntland declared its autonomy, and Abdullahi Yusuf Ahmed, who later served as the 8th President of Somalia, was chosen as the state's first president.

On 8 January 2024, President Said Abdullahi Deni was re-elected in the 2024 Puntland presidential election.

== Qualification eligibility ==
To be eligible as the president of Puntland, according to Article 78 of the Puntland Constitution. candidate must meet the following criteria:

- Be a native of Puntland.
- Be a practicing Muslim.
- Be mentally sound.
- Be older than age 40.
- Not be married to a foreigner.
- Have educational qualifications, experience, and leadership credentials.
- Have lived in Puntland for the past two years.
- Not have been convicted by a court of a major crime.

== Term of office ==
The first president, Abdullahi Yusuf Ahmed was mandated to serve three years in office by the early Puntland provisional charter.

After yusuf term expired in 2001, Puntland House of Representatives extended the executive (president and vice president) term.

That extension caused Puntland crisis (2001–2003). There have been no term extensions for the presidency since Abdullahi Yusuf.

Since then 2005 Puntland presidential election, the presidential election should be held on January 8th after the president and vice president has completed their term in office, according to the Constitution of Puntland.

After April 18, 2012, Puntland constitution was ratified and was effective March 4, 2012, the president and vice president are should be held office for a duration of five years. The term of office of the incumbent president continues until the president-elect takes office. Upon assuming office, the president takes the following oath in front of the House of Representatives of Puntland;

I swear in the name of Allah that I will perform my duties honestly and in the best interest of the Nation, People, and Religion, and that I will abide by the Constitution and the other Laws of the Country.

— Puntland Constitution

== List ==
In 2001, the first president, Abdullahi Yusuf Ahmed, whose term was expiring, was ousted from the capital by the opposition for refusing to step down. The opposition held a shir (council) in November and elected Jama Ali Jama as president. Therefore, Jama Ali Jama is sometimes considered the second president of Puntland.

However, Abdullahi Yusuf Ahmed formed an army and, with Ethiopian support, expelled Jama Ali Jama from the capital in early 2002. Therefore, today, Somali media usually do not count Jama Ali Jama a Puntland president, and report Mohamed Abdi Hashi as the second president.

Therefore, Abdirahman Farole is the "fourth president," according to a document issued in 2018 by the Puntland Bureau of Statistics. And the current president of Puntland, Said Deni, writes in his Facebook page until 2023, "The 6th and Current President Of the Puntland State of Somalia", and from 2024, "The 7th and Current President Of the Puntland State of Somalia."

No.	Portrait	Name (birth–death)	Term of office			Party	Vice president	Election
No.	Portrait	Name (birth–death)	Took office	Left office	Time in office	Party	Vice president	Election
1		Abdullahi Yusuf Ahmed (1934–2012)	1 August 1998	30 June 2001	2 years, 333 days	Independent	Mohamed Abdi Hashi	1998
—		Yusuf Haji Nur (?–2019) acting	1 July 2001	14 November 2001	136 days	Independent	Vacant	—
—		Jama Ali Jama (born ?) acting	14 November 2001	8 May 2002	175 days	Independent	Ahmad Mahmud Gunle	2001
(1)		Abdullahi Yusuf Ahmed (1934–2012)	8 May 2002	14 October 2004	2 years, 159 days	Independent	Mohamed Abdi Hashi	—
2		Mohamed Abdi Hashi (1950s–2020) '	14 October 2004	8 January 2005	86 days	United Somali Party	Mohamed Ali Yusuf	~
3		Mohamud Muse Hersi (1937–2017)	8 January 2005	8 January 2009	4 years, 0 days	Independent	Hassan Dahir Afqurac	2005
4		Abdirahman Farole (born 1945)	8 January 2009	8 January 2014	5 years, 0 days	Horseed	Abdisamad Ali Shire	2009
5		Abdiweli Gaas (born 1963)	8 January 2014	8 January 2019	5 years, 0 days	UDAD	Abdihakim Amey	2014
6, 7		Said Abdullahi Deni (1967–)	8 January 2019	Incumbent	7 years, 242 days	Kaah	Ahmed Elmi Osman	2019
6, 7		Said Abdullahi Deni (1967–)	8 January 2019	Incumbent	7 years, 242 days	Kaah	Ilyas Osman Lugator	2024

== Latest election ==
On January 8, 2024, Said Abdullahi Deni, the incumbent President of Puntland, was re-elected following an election held in Garoowe, the capital of Puntland. Deni was declared as the winner in the third round of the election, securing 45 votes, while Guled Salah Barre, the runner-up candidate, received 21 votes. Deni went on to become the first President of Puntland to be re-elected and sworn in, and he should have held office for another five-year term.

Candidate	Party	First round		Second round		Third round	
Candidate	Party	Votes	%	Votes	%	Votes	%
Said Abdullahi Deni	Kaah	35	53.03	40	60.61	45	68.18
Guled Salah Barre	Independent	9	13.64	17	25.76	21	31.82
Abshir Omar Huruse	Mideeye	8	12.12	9	13.64		
Hassan Shire Abgal	Kaah	5	7.58				
Ahmed Isse Awad	Independent	4	6.06				
Asad Osman Abdullahi	Mideeye	3	4.55				
Mohamed Abdirahman Farole	Horseed	2	3.03				
Total		66	100.00	66	100.00	66	100.00
Source: Caasimada, Caasimada Garowe Online
