= Ahmed Elmi Osman =

Former Vice President of Puntland from 2019 to 2024

Ahmed Karaash
- Axmed Cilmi Cismaan "Karaash" أحمد علمي عثمان كراش
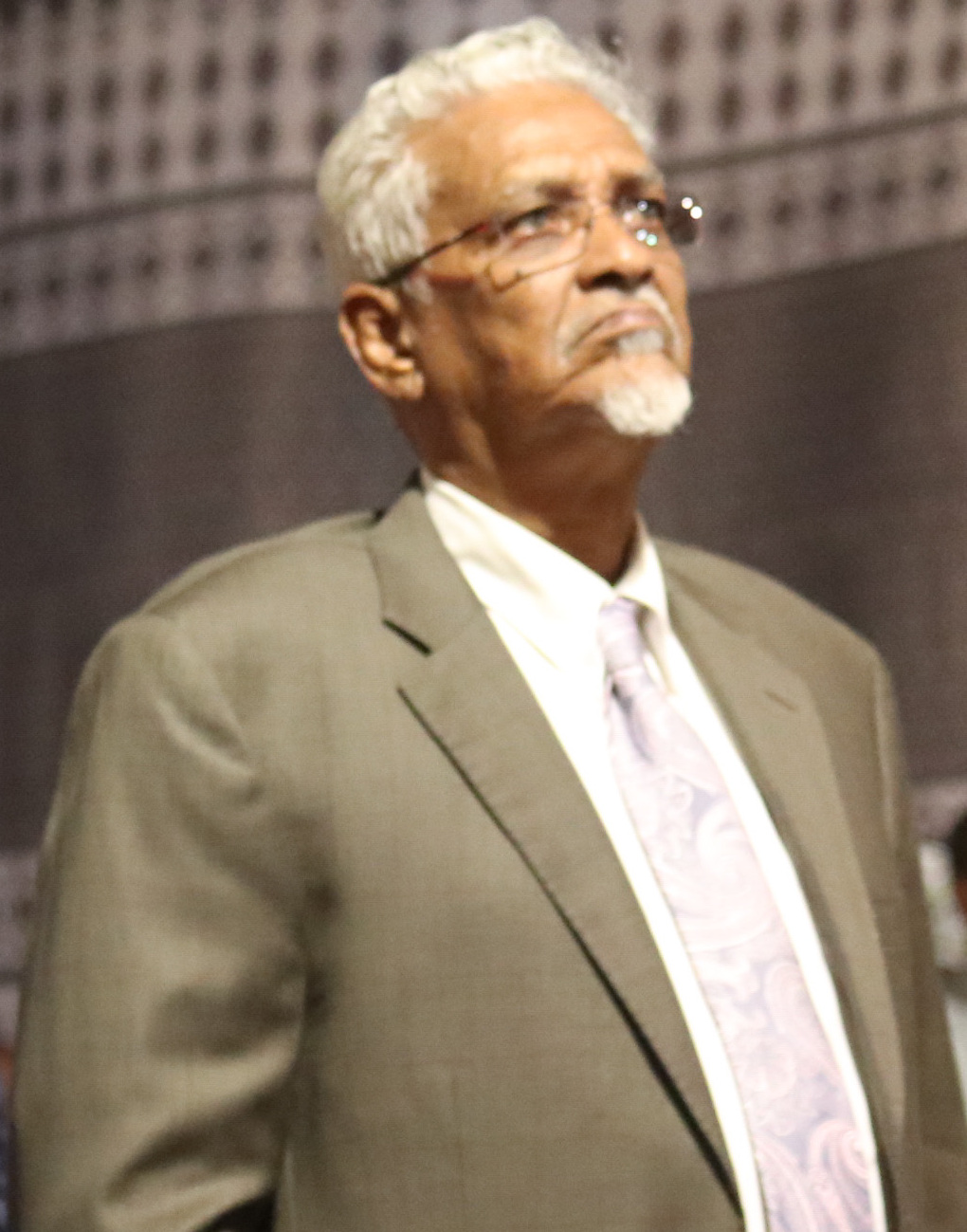
- Axmed Cilmi Cismaan (Karaash) in 2019

6th Vice President of Puntland
- In office 8 January 2019 – 8 January 2024
- President: Said Abdullahi Deni
- Preceded by: Abdihakim Amey
- Succeeded by: Ilyas Osman Lugator

Puntland Minister of Interior, Federal Affairs and Democratization
- In office 28 January 2014 – March 2015
- President: Abdiweli Mohamed Ali
- Vice President: Abdihakim Abdullahi Haji Omar
- Preceded by: Abdullahi Ahmed Jama

Puntland Minister of Civil Aviation and Airport Authority
- In office 2009–2012
- President: Abdirahman Farole
- Vice President: Abdisamad Ali Shire

President of Khatumo State
- In office 2012 – 2013; Serving with Abdinuur Elmi Qaaji and Mohamed Yusuf Jama
- Preceded by: Position Established
- Succeeded by: Mohamed Yusuf Jama

Puntland Minister of Civil Aviation and Airport Authority

Personal details
- Born: Erigavo, Somaliland
- Party: Kaah
- Nickname: Karaash

His Excellency Ahmed Elmi Osman 'Karash', better known as Ahmed Karaash (Somali: Axmed Cilmi Cismaan "Karaash", Arabic: أحمد علمي عثمان كراش) is a Puntland politician who served Vice President of Puntland from 8 January 2019 to 8 January 2024. Karaash served Ministry of Civil Aviation and Airport Authority twice, after confronting Puntland president Abdirahman Farole he defecting to Sool region he formed Khatumo State and later dissolved and backed to Puntland Government where he served Ministry of Interior, Federal Affairs and Democratization.

He belongs to the Naleye Ahmed sub-clan of the Mohamoud Garad branch of the Dhulbahante, Harti larger Darod tribe.

== Personal life ==
Karaash belongs to the Naleye Ahmed sub-subsection of the Mohamoud Garad branch of the Dhulbahante Harti Darod clan.

== Career ==
=== Early career ===
In 2009, Karaash served as the Minister of Aviation of the Government of Puntland. He later helped form Khatumo State administration, acting as one of its three "presidents".

In 2013, Karaash presented himself as a Vice President of Puntland candidate in the 2014 Puntland elections, which took place on 8 January 2014 in Garowe. Abdihakim Abdullahi Haji Omar was eventually declared the winner.

In 2019 election, Karaash was elected as a Vice President of Puntland working underneath the newly elected president Said Abdullahi Deni.

=== Minister of Interior ===
==== Appointment ====
On 28 January 2014, Karaash was appointed Puntland's Minister of Interior by the region's new President Abdiweli Mohamed Ali.

==== Telecommunications reform ====
In October 2014, Karaash issued a decree through the Puntland Ministry of Interior ordering all local telecommunication firms and remittance stores to require a Puntland identity card from their customers before providing services. According to the ministry, the directive is part of a broader initiative aimed at strengthening security and data collection. It also set an immediate timeframe for the decree's implementation.

==== Money remittance policy ====
In March 2015, Puntland President Abdiweli Mohamed Ali established a government committee to formulate an official money remittance policy for the Puntland regional state. Puntland Minister of Interior Karaash serves as the Chairman of the new panel. The committee is composed of Puntland cabinet members.

==== Karkar delegation ====
In March 2015, Puntland Minister of Interior Karaash and other regional state officials launched a reconciliation conference in support of peace agreements that had been signed in Rakko district and other parts of the Karkaar region. A high-level Puntland government delegation consisting of cabinets and other officials was dispatched to the area to enforce the treaties. According to Karaash, the delegates were led by Puntland Vice President Abdihakim Abdullahi Haji Omar, with the negotiation meeting concluding successfully.

== See also ==
- Shire Haji Farah

Political offices
Preceded by Abdihakim Abdullahi Haji Omar	Vice President of Puntland; 2019-2024	Succeeded by Ilyas Osman Lugator
