= Ilyas Osman Lugator =

Vice President of Puntland since 2024

- Ilyaas Cismaan Lugatoor
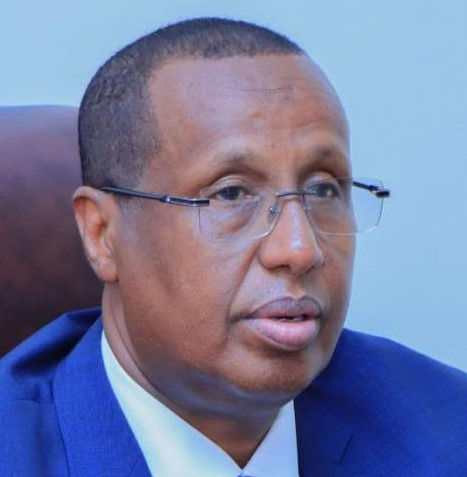

7th Vice President of Puntland
- Incumbent
- Assumed office 8 January 2024
- President: Said Abdullahi Dani
- Preceded by: Ahmed Elmi Osman

Personal details
- Born: 1967 (age 58–59) Bo'ame Somalia
- Party: Kaah

Ilyas Osman Lugator (Somali: Ilyaas Cismaan Lugatoor) is a Somali politician who setves as the incumbent vice president of Puntland, a semi-autonomous state in northeastern Somalia, since January 2024. He also known by his nickname Gabilay.

== Personal life ==
Ilyas Osman Lugator was born in October 1967 Bo'ame, Sool. He is from the Xasan Ughaz branch of the Dhulbahante clan.

== Career ==
=== Minister of Aviation and Airports ===
In February 2019 Lugator was appointed Minister of Aviation and Airports.

In March 2019, Lugator visited Bo'ame as part of the Puntland delegation.

In June 2019, Lugator accompanied President Puntland on a visit to China.

In July 2019, Lugator appointed a Badhan airport director.

In November 2019, Lugator partnered with China's Frontier Services Group on the expansion of Garowe Airport.

In February 2020, Lugator criticized the new aviation law submitted to the Federal Parliament of Somalia.

In April 2020, Lugator became chairman of the Kaah party's council.

In August 2022, Lugator confronted Abdikarim Adan Haji Diriye, governor of Sool region of Somaliland, over Bo'ame. Lugator announced that Somaliland troops entered Bo'ame but withdrew within an hour. Meanwhile, the Somaliland government announced that it had taken control of the entire Sool district with the capture of Bo'ame.

In November 2022, the conflict between Daahir Xaaji Khaliif and Lugator sharpened within the Xasan Ugaas clan.

In December 2022, President Puntland and Vice President Lugator confronted each other; Lugator defended the President.

=== Vice President ===
In January 2024, Lugator was elected vice president of Puntland.

In January 2024, Lugator said he was responsible for SSC-Khatumo in Puntland.

In March 2024, Lugator met with a delegation from the International Rescue Committee.

Political offices
| Preceded by Ahmed Elmi Osman | Vice President of Puntland; 2024–present | Incumbent |
