= Mideeye =

Political party in Puntland

Mideeye Political Association Urur Siyaasadeedka Mideeye
- Abbreviation: MDY
- Leader: Asad Osman Abdullahi
- Chairperson: Dahir Haji Khalif
- General Secretary: Abshir Omar Huruse
- Founded: July 19, 2020
- Headquarters: Garowe, Puntland
- Colors: Blue; White

Mideeye Political Association (Somali: Urur Siyaasadeedka Mideeye) is a political party in Puntland.

== Establishment ==
On 19 July 2020, a political association named Mideeye was established with a focus on unity and purpose in Puntland. The organization showcased political influence through diverse high-profile participants, including former ministers from previous Puntland administrations. Founders, regional representatives, religious leaders, and women's groups participated in the inaugural conference.

During the conference's second day, Dahir Haji Khalif, a former Puntland Minister, was elected as the Chairman of Mideeye. The Central Committee also elected Najah Mohamud Ali as the First Deputy Chairman, Abdallah Sheikh Ahmed Yusuf as the Second Deputy Chairman, and Abshir Omar Huruse as the Secretary General, and also became the first political party in Puntland to appoint a woman to a senior political leadership role.

Three former Puntland presidential candidates also became members of Mideeye, The organization aimed to win the Puntland Presidency, maintaining strong relations with the Federal Government of Somalia and Federal Member States.

== Party members ==
- Leader: Asad Osman Abdullahi
- Chairman: Dahir Haji Khalif
- Secretary General: Abshir Omar Huruse
- Member: Farah Ali Jama
- Member: Ali Haji Warsame

== History ==
Mideeye was officially recognized on August 4, 2023, as a political party. They condemned the Puntland executive and legislature's alleged unconstitutional actions to amend the constitution. The party also criticized delays in filing the matter with the constitutional court and accused the President's 1 August speech of misrepresentation and cover-up.

Mideeye, the largest opposition party in Puntland, urged the international community to avoid supporting an unapproved election and called on traditional elders to unite for Puntland's governance. They also advised society, opposition leaders, and stakeholders to resolve the political crisis's threat to the state's stability.
