= Said Abdullahi Deni =

President of Puntland since 2019

- Siciid Cabdullaahi Deni
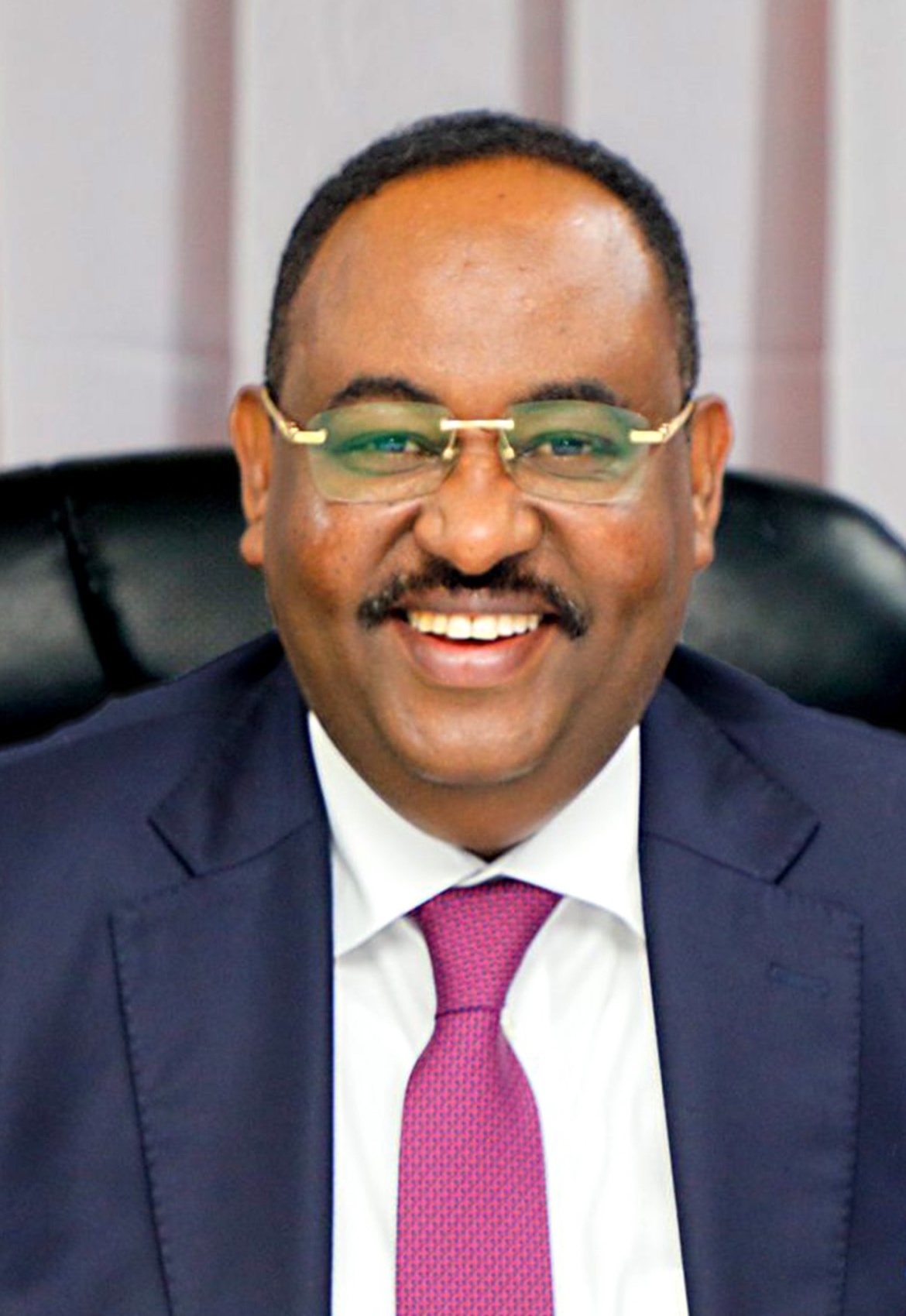
- Deni in 2021

7th President of Puntland
- Incumbent
- Assumed office 8 January 2019
- Vice President: Ahmed Elmi Osman (2019–2024); Ilyas Osman Lugator (2024–present)
- Preceded by: Abdiweli Gaas

Minister of Planning and International Cooperation
- In office 17 January 2014 – 22 February 2017
- President: Hassan Sheikh Mohamud
- Prime Minister: Abdiweli Sheikh Ahmed
- Preceded by: Mohamud Hassan Suleiman

Personal details
- Born: 2 July 1967 (age 59) Mogadishu, Somalia
- Party: Kaah
- Education: Somali National University
- Occupation: Businessman; President; Politician
- Nickname: Deni

Said Abdullahi Mohamed Deni (Somali: Siciid Cabdullaahi Maxamed Deni; born 2 July 1967), also known as Said Deni, is a Somali politician who serves as the current and 6th president of Puntland, a semi-autonomous state of Somalia. He was first elected on 8 January 2019 and served as a president for 5 years. He was re-elected for a second term on 8 January 2024.

Said was born in Mogadishu, Somalia. His family hails from the (Bah-Dhulbahante) Osman Mohamoud sub of the larger Harti Majeerteen. Previously, he served as the minister of planning of Somalia, after having been appointed to the position on 17 January 2014 by the prime minister, Abdiweli Sheikh Ahmed. He was also a presidential candidate in the 2017 and 2022 elections for the Somali presidency. Since 2020, he represents the Kaah political association.

== Minister of Planning ==
=== Somalia–Japan bilateral cooperation ===
In March 2014, Mohamed and a Somali government delegation including President Hassan Sheikh Mohamud, Minister of Foreign Affairs and International Cooperation Abdirahman Duale Beyle and Minister of Public Works and Reconstruction Nadifo Mohamed Osman made a four-day visit to Tokyo, where they met with Ambassador Tatsushi Terada and other senior Japanese government officials. President Mohamud and his delegation also conferred with Prime Minister Shinzo Abe to discuss strengthening bilateral relations, as well as capacity training for Somali livestock and agricultural development professionals. The visit concluded with an announcement by Japanese Prime Minister Abe that his administration would put forth a $40 million funding package for the rehabilitation of Somalia's police forces, relief services, and job creation opportunities. Mohamud commended the Japanese government for intensifying its bilateral support, and suggested that the development initiatives would be centered on vocational training for youth and women, maritime and fisheries training, fisheries and agricultural infrastructure development, and communication and information technology support.

=== Population census ===
In September 2014, the Ministry of Planning and International Cooperation published a preliminary population census for Somalia. It is the first such governmental initiative in over two decades. The UNFPA assisted the Ministry in the project, which is slated to be finalized ahead of the planned plebiscite and local and national elections in 2016. According to Minister of Planning Said Deni and Deputy Prime Minister Ridwan Hirsi Mohamed, the census will facilitate the implementation of Vision 2016 and general development projects in the country. The Ministry of Planning also indicated that the preliminary census data suggests that there are around 12,360,000 residents in the nation, and that it plans to conduct a census of Somali expatriates.

== President of Puntland ==
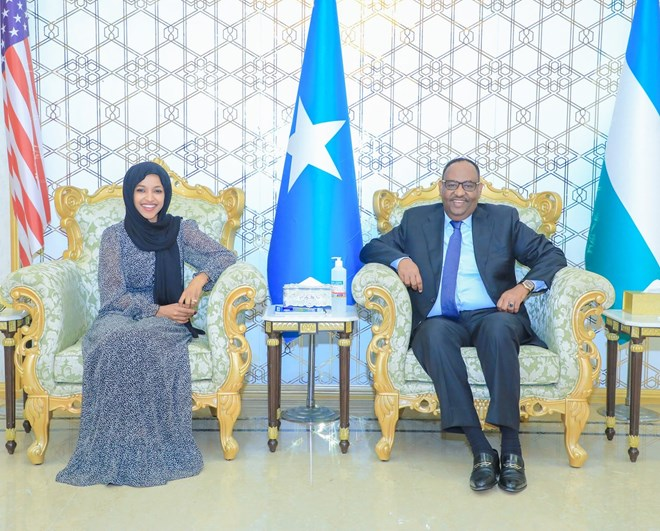
Ilhan Omar with Said Deni, December 2022

=== Puntland presidential election ===
The Puntland parliament elected a new president on 8 January 2019 in a hotly contested presidential election.

Former Federal Minister for Planning and International Cooperation Said Abdullahi Deni and Ahmed Elmi Karash were elected as President and Vice President of Puntland, respectively.

Deni won 35 out of 66 votes from lawmakers in the third, and last round, defeating 20 other candidates. His closest challenger, General Asad Osman Abdullahi, former Puntland spy chief, received 31 votes.

The new president, 52, is widely known for his role in education in Puntland where he helped establish schools and universities. In 2017 he mounted an unsuccessful run for president of Somalia.

Deni campaigned on promoting economic growth and fighting corruption in the relatively peaceful Somali region.

“A new chapter has opened for this state, a chapter of unity and brotherly relations among Somalis,” the new president said.

Puntland's outgoing president, Abdiwali Mohamed Ali, lost in the first round of the election with only eight votes.

=== Second presidential election ===
On 8 January 2024, Deni was re-elected as president of Puntland. He was voted in by 45 out of the 66 by sixth parliament of Puntland.

Political offices
Preceded by Abdiweli Gaas	President of Puntland; 2019–present	Incumbent
