= 6th Parliament of Puntland =

Legislature of Puntland from 2023

Parliament of the Puntland of the 6th Unicameral legislative assembly
←	5th Parliament of Puntland

Overview
- Legislative body: Puntland Parliament
- Jurisdiction: Government of Puntland
- Meeting place: Parliament Building, Garowe
- Term: 1 January 2024 –
- Election: 31 December 2023
- Website: Official website
- Members: 66th
- Speaker of the House of Representatives of Puntland: Abdirizak Ahmed Said
- First Deputy Speaker of the House of Representatives of Puntland: Mohamed Baari Shire
- Second Deputy Speaker of the House of Representatives of Puntland: Mohamed Mohamoud Isse

The 6th parliament of Puntland (Somali: Baarlamaankii 6aad ee Puntland) is the current Unicameral legislative assembly of the House of Representatives of Puntland.

Abdirizak Ahmed Said was elected and current speaker 6th Parliament of Puntland.

== List of members ==
1. Abdiaziz Ahmed Salah
2. Abdikadir Salah Ali Guled
3. Abdikafi Abdi Abshir III
4. Abdikhaliq Mohamed Mohamoud
5. Abdimahad Ali Liban
6. Abdirahman Haji Ahmed Adam
7. Abdirahman Sheikh Hassan Gablah
8. Abdirashid Ahmed Mohamed
9. Abdirashid Yusuf Jibril Awl
10. Abdirisak Ahmed Said Farah
11. Abdirisak Jama Adam
12. Abdirisak Omar Ismail
13. Abdirisak Sharif Ahmed
14. Abdiwali Yusuf Warsame
15. Abdulgani Farah Dhashane
16. Abdulkadir Hassan Said
17. Abuubakar Mohamed Omar
18. Ahmed Abdirahman Jama
19. Ahmed Bille Said
20. Ahmed Haji Mohamud Ahmed
21. Ahmed Jamal Hangulle
22. Ahmed Said Yusuf
23. Ali Ahmed Mohamoud Samatar
24. Bashir Mire Ahmed Adam
25. Faisal Mohamed Dalmar
26. Farah Jama Yusuf
27. Farah Mohamed Abdi Hashi
28. Farah Salad Nuh
29. Hared Hassan Ali
30. Hassan Abdalle Hassan
31. Hassan Dualle Ali
32. Hassan Yusuf Majabe
33. Hussein Ahmed Nur Mohamed
34. Ibrahim Aseyr Gurase
35. Ismail Suleyman Gelle
36. Jafar Mohamed Gedaweyne
37. Jama abdiaziz ahmed
38. Khadar Farah Mohamed
39. Liban Bedel Sheikh Mohamud
40. Mohamed Ali Subeyr
41. Mohamed Awil Ali Dalaf
42. Mohamed Baari Shire
43. Mohamed Farah Mohamed
44. Mohamed Mohamoud Isse
45. Mohamed Mohamoud Omar
46. Mohamed Mohamud Abdi
47. Mohamed Mursal Mohamed
48. Mohamed Said Ali
49. Mohamed Salad Abdi
50. Mohamoud Abdirahman Mohamoud
51. Mohamoud Adamweli Mohamed
52. Mohamoud Ahmed Hassan
53. Mohamoud Ali Mohamoud
54. Mohamoud Dhakul Hirsi
55. Mohamoud Shire Osman
56. Mowlid Abokar Aafi
57. Mukhtar Abdirahman Ahmed
58. Mukhtar Omar Al
59. Muna Ahmed Abdalla
60. Mursal Mohamoud Abdi Ali
61. Mustafe Bille Mohamoud
62. Nasib Musse Ali
63. Osman Yusuf Haraare
64. Qalib Hassan Mohamoud
65. Yasin Jama Omar
66. Yusuf Ali Said
