= Mohamud Muse Hersi =

Former President of Puntland from 2005 to 2009

Major general Mohamud Muse Hersi محمد موسى حرسي
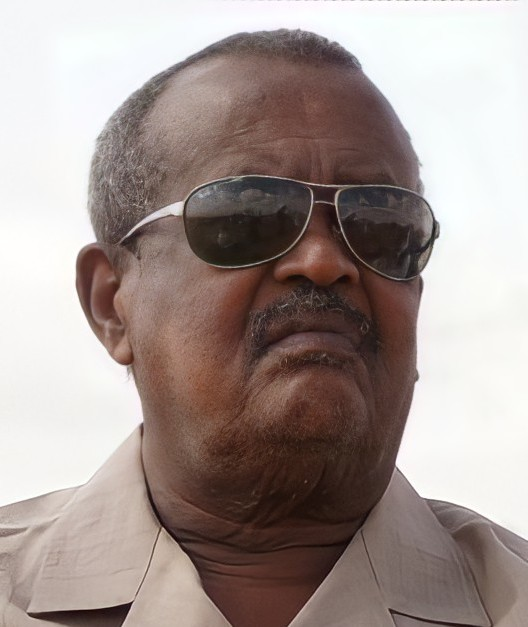

3rd President of the Puntland
- In office 8 January 2005 – 8 January 2009
- Vice President: Hassan Dahir Afqurac
- Preceded by: Mohamed Abdi Hashi
- Succeeded by: Abdirahman Mohamud Farole

Personal details
- Born: 1 July 1937 Bayla, Italian East Africa
- Died: 8 February 2017 (aged 79) Abu Dhabi, United Arab Emirates
- Party: Independent politician

Military service
- Rank: Major General
- Battles/wars: Ogaden War; Somali Civil War

Maj Gen Mohamud Muse Hersi (Somali: Maxamuud Muuse Xirsi Cadde, Arabic: محمد موسى حرسي; 1 July 1937 – 8 February 2017), AKA Adde Musa, was a Somali military official and former President of Puntland from 8 January 2005 to 8 January 2009.

== Biography ==
A former General in the Somali Armed Forces of long-time Somali president Mohamed Siad Barre, Muse later became a local and state governor in northern Somalia before the outbreak of the Somali Civil War. He hails from the Bah-Dir Roble sub of the larger Osman Mahamuud sub-clan and is the great-grandson of Xirsi Boqor Osman, son of Boqor Osman Mahamuud.

- 1963 – 1965 Secretariat to The Chief of Military Forces
- 1965 – 1967 Chairman of Horseed political party
- 1970 – 1972 Commander of the 21st Division, Somali National Army
- 1972 – 1973 Chief of Training, Somali Military Forces

He also served as a military attaché to China during the mid to late 1970s. After his stint in China, he later relocated to Canada in 1979, where he owned and managed several gas stations until the mid-1990s.

Muse died in the United Arab Emirates on 8 February 2017.

== President of Puntland ==
In March 2005, then incumbent President Muse began an ambitious plan to build an airport in Puntland's commercial capital of Bosaso, a project which is now complete and referred to as Bender Qassim International Airport. The following month, UNICEF praised a pledge from Muse who promised to inaugurate salary payments for primary school teachers, which would mark a major break from the norm in Somalia where, traditionally parents have had to bear full responsibility for the payment of teachers.

In November 2006, the Union of Islamic Courts reportedly captured Bandiiradley, a strategically located settlement near Puntland's border with Mudug. However, a spokesman for local warlord Abdi Hassan Awale Qeybdiid claimed that his troops had only made a tactical retreat from the area. Mohamed Mohamud Jama, a Mudug-based spokesman for the Islamic Courts, announced the courts' intention to march on Gaalkacyo, part of which is claimed by Puntland. Heretofore, the courts had avoided making incursions into Puntland. That same month, General Adde announced that he would rule according to Islamic law but in a different way from that of the Islamic Courts in order to avoid "politicising religion." Adde then announced that Puntland would resist any attack made by the Islamic Courts.

During the 2008 election year, Puntland saw a spike in piracy. Then incumbent President Mohamud Muse Hersi was quoted on Al Jazeera as saying that "giving in to the pirates' demands was not an option. We do not advocate for any ransom to be paid to the pirates and we support the French government, which uses force, while taking on the pirates".

In October 2008, Muse also signed a Dh170 million agreement with Dubai's Lootah Group to support the construction of an airport, seaport and free zone in the coastal city of Bosaso. Muse indicated that "I believe that when we finish all these projects our people will benefit by getting good health services, education and overall prosperity."

Muse's term as President of Puntland ended in January 2009.

== Death ==
Muse died in UAE on 8 February 2017.

== Notes ==
Political offices
Preceded by Mohamed Abdi Hashi; Acting	President of Puntland; 2005-2009	Succeeded by Abdirahman Farole
