= Kaah Political Association =

Political party in Somalia

Kaah Political Association Urur Siyaasadeedka Kaah
- Chairman: Said Abdullahi Dani
- 1st Vice Chairman: Ilyas Osman Lugator
- 2nd Vice Chairman: Abdirizak Ahmed Saidl
- Headquarters: Garowe, Puntland, Somalia
- Ideology: Democracy
- Political position: Centre
- Colors: Blue, Yellow

Kaah Political Association (Somali: Urur Siyaasadeedka Kaah) is the ruling political party in Puntland.

== History ==
On 21 May 2020, President of Puntland Said Abdullahi Dani joined the party.

On 15 July 2020, the members of Federal Government of Somalia has met with Said Deni at the party's headquarters in Mogadishu.

On 18 July 2020, a party conference was held, where Said Dani was elected its chairman. The Central Committee has also elected Ahmed Elmi Osman Karaash as the 1st Vice Chairman of Kaah. The Speaker of the House of Representatives, Abdirashid Yusuf Jibril Awl was also elected as the 2nd Vice Chairman of Kaah.

On 26 November 2020, Said Deni held a meeting with party leaders and members.

== See also ==
- Political parties in Somalia
