= House of Representatives of Puntland =

Unicameral legislature of Puntland, Somalia

Puntland Parliament House of Representatives of Puntland Gollaha Wakiilada Dawladda Puntland مجلس نواب بونتلاند
- 6th Parliament of Puntland
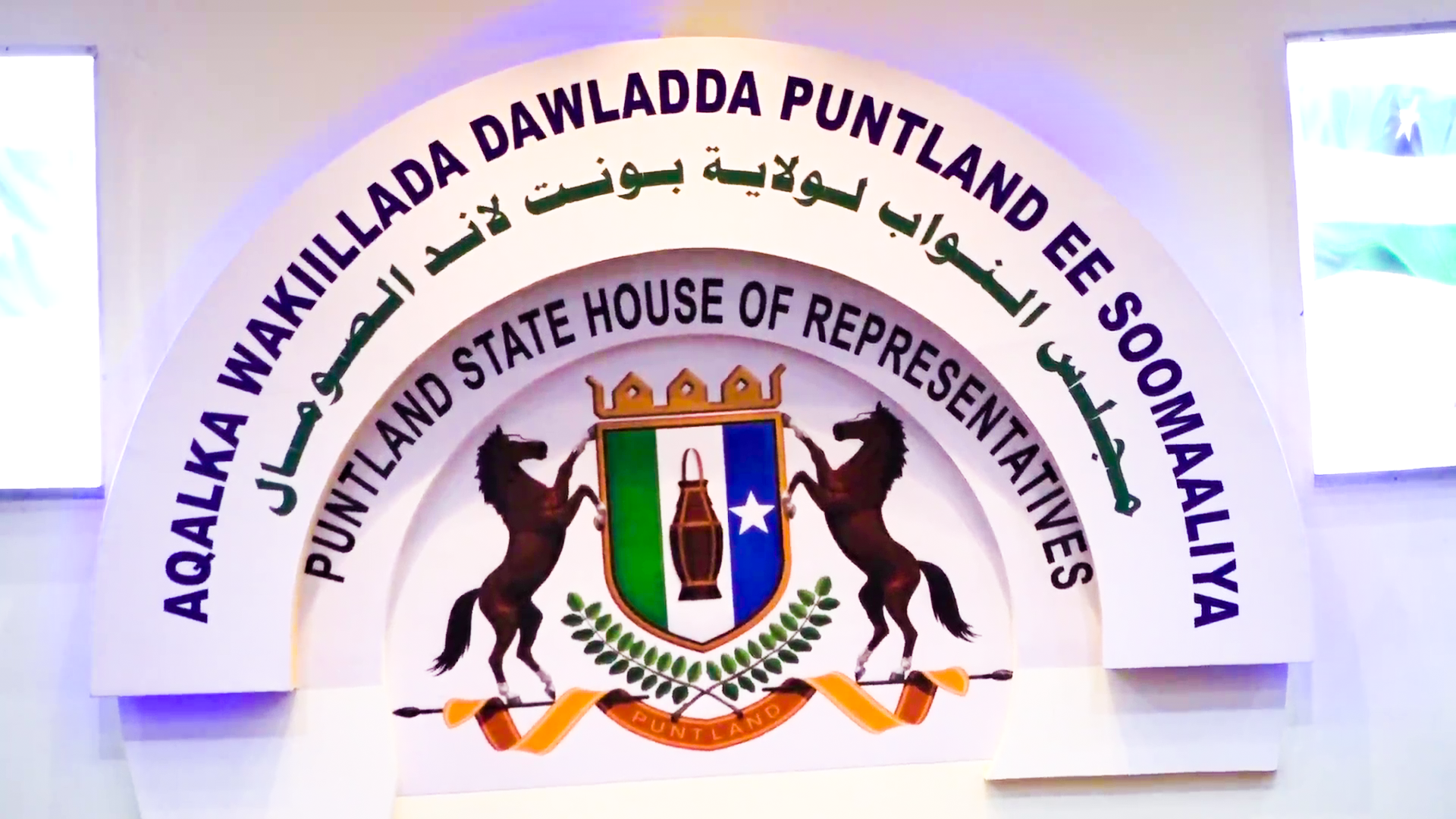

Type
- Type: Unicameral of Puntland
- Houses: House of Representatives

History
- Founded: 1998

Structure
- Seats: 66
- Length of term: 5 years

Elections
- Last House of Representatives election: 2023
- Next House of Representatives election: 2028

Meeting place
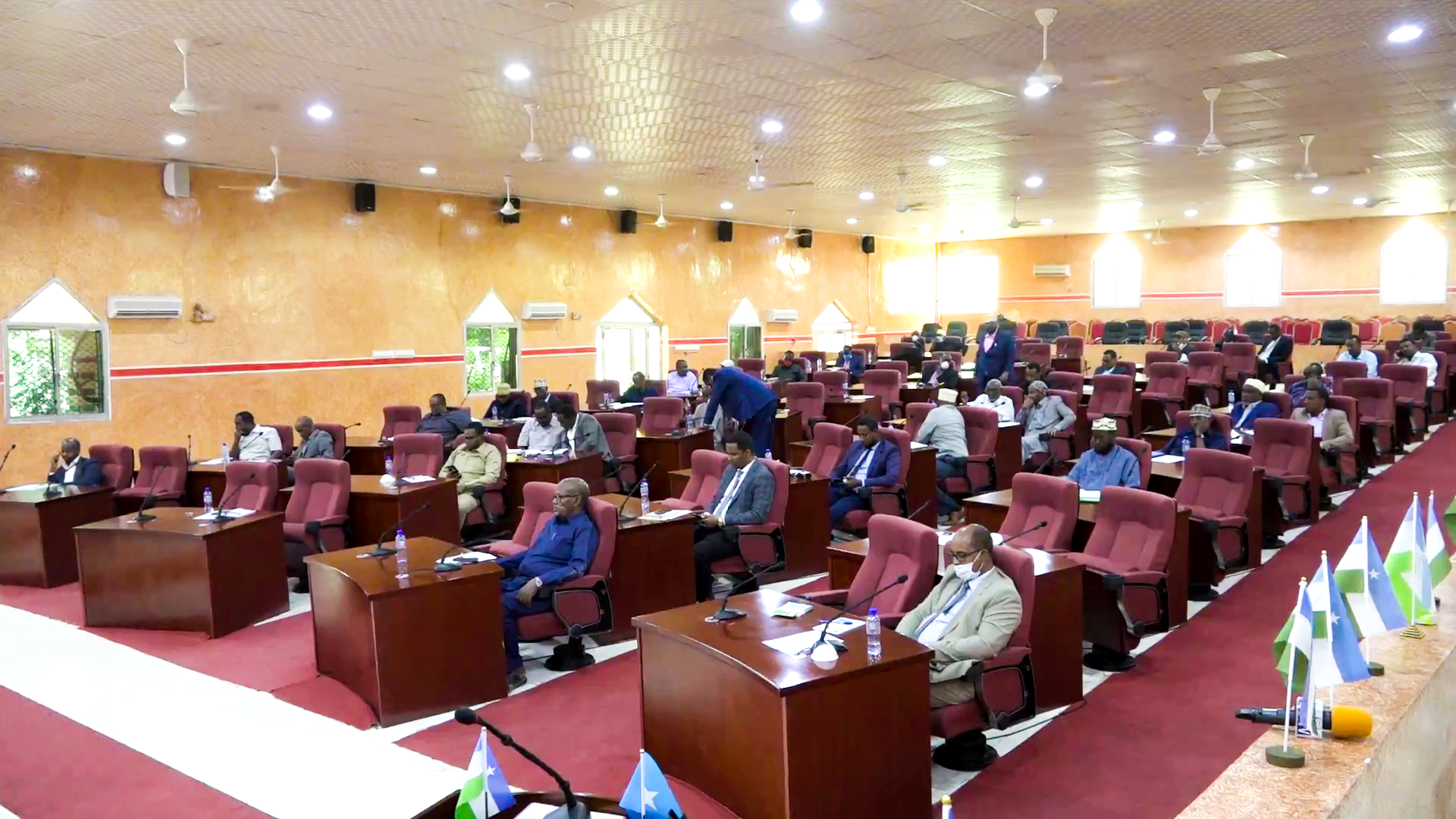
- Parliament Building, Garowe

Website
- puntlandparliament.com

The House of Representatives of Puntland or the Puntland Parliament (Somali: Gollaha Wakiilada Dawladda Puntland) is the unicameral legislature of Puntland. It has 66 members who are elected for a period of five years through universal suffrage.

The House of Representatives has the powers and duties to review, approve, reject, amend and create regulations, approve/reject war and implement a peace agreement when the government proposes it. The House of Representatives also elects the president of Puntland as well as the vice president of Puntland.

After the establishment of Puntland, the legislature has been directly elected by the people in 1998, 2004, 2009, 2013, 2018, On 4 January 2024, the legislature elected Abdirizak Ahmed Said a speaker and two deputies. This was followed by the successful presidential election on 8 January 2024. Next elections are due to take place in 2028.

== Speakers ==
#	Name	Period
1	Yusuf Haji Sa'id	1998–2004
2	Cismaan Dalmar X. Yuusuf (Batrool)	2004–2007
3	Ahmed Ali Hashi	2006–2009
4	Abdirashid Mohamed Hersi	2009–2013
5	Said Hassan Shire	2014–2015
6	Ahmed Ali Hashi	2015–2019
7	Abdihakim Mohamed Ahmed	2019–2019
8	Abdirashid Yusuf Jibril	2019–2024
9	Abdirisak Ahmed Said	2024–present

== See also ==
- Puntland
- Speaker of the House of Representatives of Puntland
