= Mire Aware Jama =

Somali politician (1930-1993)

Jaalle Mire Aware Jama
- ميري أواري جامع; Mire Awaare Jaamac

President of the Somali National Olympic Committee
- In office 1979–1980
- President: Mohamed Siad Barre

Somali Minister of Youth and Sports
- In office 1980–1985
- President: Mohamed Siad Barre

Somali Minister of Labour and Sports
- In office 1985–1987
- President: Mohamed Siad Barre

Somali Minister of Youth and Sports (again)
- In office 1987–1989
- President: Mohamed Siad Barre

Personal details
- Born: 1930 Garowe, Somalia
- Died: 1993 Garowe-Bosaso Highway
- Citizenship: Somali
- Party: Somali Revolutionary Socialist Party

Military service
- Somali Armed Forces: Colonel

Mire Aware Jama (Somali: Mire Awaare Jaamac; Arabic: ميري أواري جامع; 1930 — 1993) was a Somali politician and Military colonel, a key figure in 20th-century Somali politics, he was the president of the Somali Olympic Committee from 1979 to 1980. Serving as Colonel in the Somali Armed Forces, he was Minister of Youth and Sports (1980–1985), Minister of Labor and Sports (1985–1987), and Minister of Youth and Sports again (1987–1989).

== Biography ==
Mire Aware Jama, born in 1930 in Garowe, Somalia, was a prominent figure in Somali politics and the military. He obtained a degree in political science in 1976. He was appointed president of the Somali Olympic Committee in 1980.

== Career ==
Mire Aware was appointed by President of the Somali Republic Mohamed Siad Barre, he served as the President of the Somali National Olympic Committee from 1979 to 1980.

Mire Aware Jama held the rank of Colonel in the Somali Armed Forces and assumed the role of Minister of Youth and Sports from February 1980 to 1985. During the period of 1985 to 1987, the Ministry was renamed the Ministry of Labor and Sports, and Mire Aware continued as the Minister of Labor and Sports.

Following the restoration of the Ministry of Youth and Sports, Mire Aware resumed his position as the Minister from December 1987 to 1989. His contributions spanned various spheres, showcasing his commitment to both sports and labor in Somalia.

== Death and legacy ==
On 1993, Mire Aware Jama tragically lost his life in a car accident on the Garowe-Bosaso Highway. In honor of his legacy, the largest football stadium in Garowe was subsequently named Mire Aware Stadium, boasting a capacity of 30,000 attendees.

== See also ==
- Jimale Jama Takar
- Said Mohamed Hersy
- Mohamed Abshir Muse
