= Garowe (disambiguation) =

Garoe may refer to:

- Garoowe, capital city of the autonomous Puntland region in northeastern Somalia
- Garoé, tree that used to be sacred in the Canarian island of El Hierro
- Garowe Airport, International airport in Garowe, Puntland
- Garowe Principles, Treaty between Somali TFG government and states (2011)
- Garowe Online, Bilingual news outlet website
- Garowe attack, a suicide attack of bombing in a UN convoy by Al-shabab militants in Garowe 2015
- Garowe–Bosaso Highway, Highway in Puntland Somalia
- Radio Garowe, FM radio in Garowe Puntland
- Garowe District, Administrative capital of Nugal region
