= 2015 Mogadishu hotel attack =

2015 Mogadishu hotel attack may refer to:

- 2015 Central Hotel attack
- Makka al-Mukarama hotel attack
- Jazeera Palace Hotel bombing
- Sahafi Hotel attacks
