= Mire Aware Stadium =

Football stadium in Garowe, Puntland

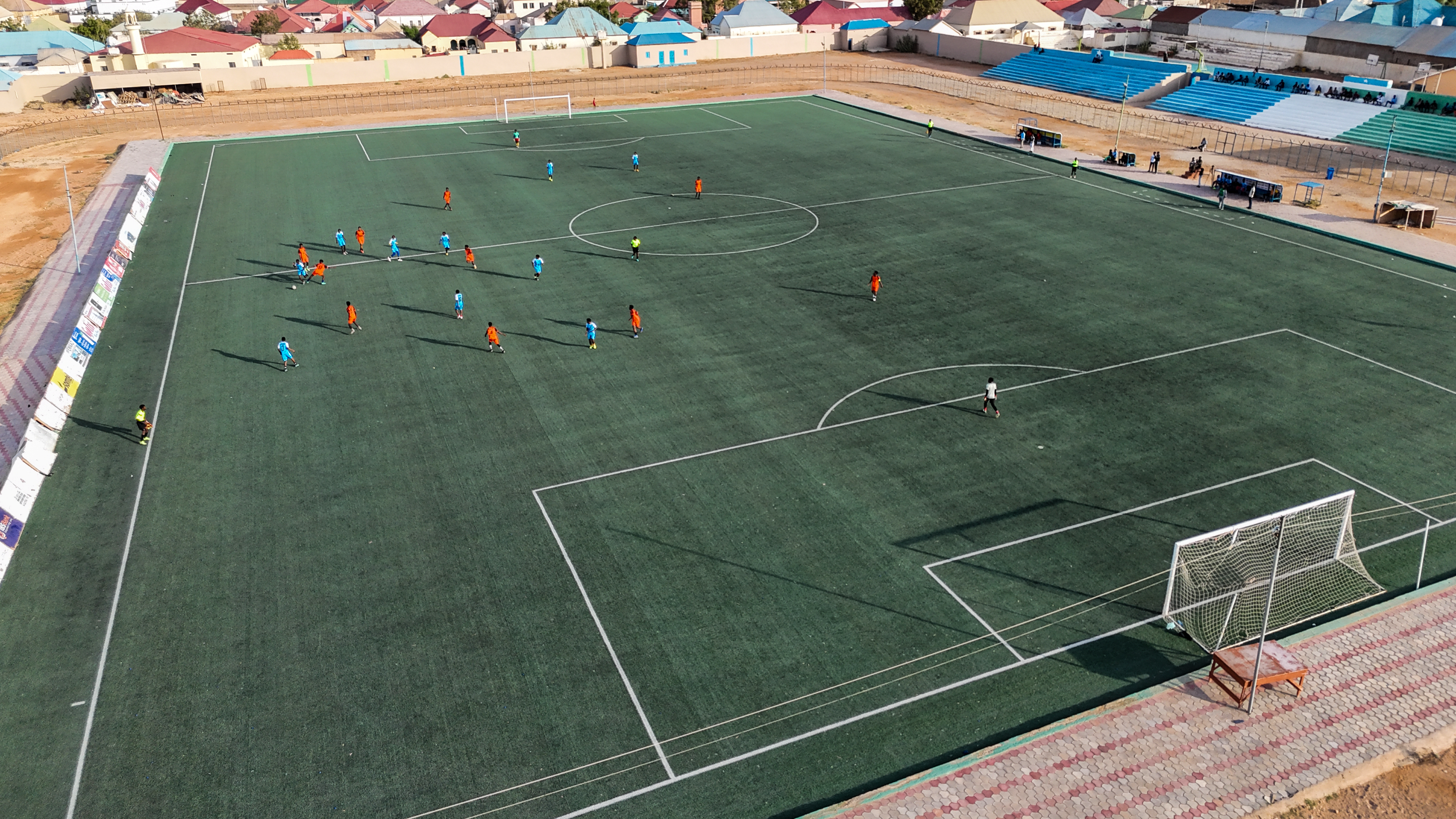
- Interactive map of Mire Aware Stadium
- Address: 9FWG+V5P Meeraysane RD; Garowe; Puntland
- Location: Garowe, Nugaal, Puntland
- Coordinates: 8°23′49.42″N 48°28′31.95″E
- Owner: Garowe District, Garowe City Council
- Operator: Garowe Municipality
- Capacity: 31,000
- Surface: artificial turf

Mire Aware Stadium is a stadium in Garowe, the administrative capital of the autonomous Puntland region in northeastern Somalia.

== History ==
In 1993, After Somali Minister of Youth and Sports, Mire Aware Jama was killed in a car accident on the Garowe-Bosaso Highway. In honor of his legacy, the Garowe football stadium was named Mire Aware Stadium, boasting a capacity of 30,000 attendees.

On January 15, 2023, the Mire Aware Stadium was closed due to a conflict between the two officials on its management. The disagreement involves a clash between the mayor of Garowe, Geeddi Ahmed Tuurre, and the chairman of the Puntland Football Federation, Mohamed Irro, as sourced by Puntland Post.
