= Abdiaziz =

Abdiaziz may refer to:

- Abdiaziz District

== People ==
- Abdiaziz Abdinur Ibrahim
- Abdiaziz A. Mohamed
- Abdiaziz Nur Elmi Koor
