= Port of Bosaso =

Port in Bari, Somalia

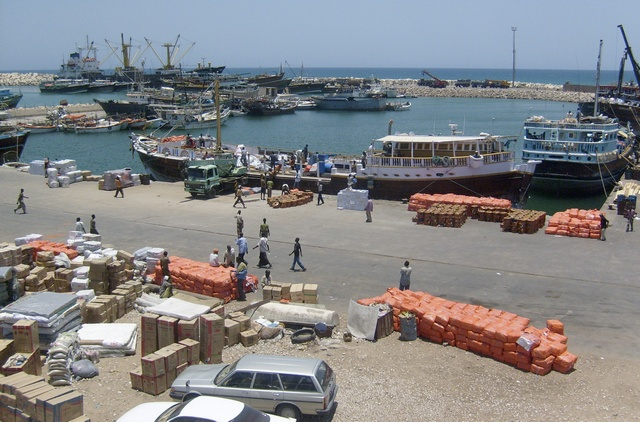
- The Port of Bosaso harbor.
- Interactive map of Port of Bosaso

Location
- Country: Somalia Puntland
- Location: Bosaso
- Coordinates: 11°17′05″N 049°10′57″E
- UN/LOCODE: SOBSA

Details
- Operated by: P&O Ports
- Owned by: Puntland

The Port of Bosaso, also known as Bosaso Port, is the official seaport of Bosaso, the commercial capital of the autonomous Puntland region in northeastern Somalia. It is classified as a major class port. The port is operated by P&O Ports since 2017. But in July 2022, the Emirates-based Dubai Ports World (DP World), a global operator of ports and logistics, returned to Bosaso.

== History ==
The modern Port of Bosaso In Puntland was constructed during the mid-1980s by the Siad Barre administration for annual livestock shipments to the Middle East. In January 2012, a renovation project was launched at the Bosaso Port, with KMC contracted to upgrade the harbor. The initiative's first phase saw the clean-up of unwanted materials from the dockyard and was completed within the month. The second phase involves the reconstruction of the port's adjoining seabed, with the objective of accommodating larger ships.

On 6 April 2017, Dubai-based P&O Ports won a 30-year concession for Port for the management and development of a multi-purpose port project. The approximate investment for the modern multi-purpose facility was US$336 million. President of Puntland, Abdiweli Mohamed Ali, and Puntland Ministry Of Ports Said Mohamed Rage has signed the agreement in Dubai on 6 April 2017. The Work on the project will involve building a 450m quay and a 5 hectare back up area, dredging to a depth of 12m with reclamation work using dredge spoil. There will also be major investment in an IT and Terminal Operating System (TOS), mobile harbor cranes and container handling equipment.

On 4 February 2019, the manager of the port was shot and killed by two Al Shabab militants disguised as fishermen. The manager was on his way to work when he was shot and killed in a fish market. Two guards at the port were also injured in the attack. Dubai based P&O ports confirmed the death of the manager as well as the injury of three others. The Shabab militant group claimed responsibility and said they had attacked P&O Ports because it “occupies” the Bosaso port. They said that the manager, a Maltese citizen, was "illegally in Somalia".

== Transportation ==
The Garowe–Bosaso Highway is a major thoroughfare in the autonomous Puntland region in northeastern Somalia . It connects the administrative capital of Garowe with the commercial hub of Bosaso, a distance of around 450 km (279.1 mi). The Garowe–Bosaso Highway was constructed in 1988, after an Italian firm Merzario had been contracted to build the main trunk road, including its culverts and bridges. Its tarmac was later completed in 1990. Abdirizak Jurile was responsible administratively and operationally to build The Garowe–Bosaso Highway and the Port of Bosaso in the Bari province. The highway starts from the Port of Bosaso and continues south as a single carriageway up over the Al-Miskat hills and downwards toward Qardho. It continues from there around 205 km (127.6 mi) southwards to Garowe thereafter the thoroughfare joins the Mogadishu – Berbera highway.

== See also ==
- DP World
