= Abdirizak Jurile =

Somali British politician

Minister of Planning and International cooperation Somalia
- In office 2004–2007

Minister of Postal Cooperation and Telecommunications Somalia
- In office 2009–2011

Personal details
- Born: 31 December 1949 (age 76) Bosaso, Somalia
- Education: Somali National University: Politics and International cooperation; Chemical Engineering

Abdirizak Osman Hassan 'Jurile' (Somali: Cabdirisaaq Cusmaan Xasan Juurile, Arabic: عبد الرزاق عثمان حسن جوريلى), commonly known as Jurile, is a Somali British politician, diplomat and professor, he served as Somali Minister of Planning and International Cooperation from July 2004 to December 2007, and later became Somali Minister of Postal Cooperation and Telecommunications. Jurile was twice or more a Member of the Federal Parliament's lower house, before moving to the Upper House (senate) of the Parliament of Somalia in October 2016. He was responsible administratively and operationally to build The Garowe–Bosaso Highway and the Port of Bosaso in the Bari province. The highway starts from the Port of Bosaso and continues south as a single carriageway up over the Al-Miskat hills and downwards toward Qardho. It continues from there around 205 km (127.6 mi) southwards to Garowe thereafter the thoroughfare joins the Mogadishu – Berbera highway.

== Career ==
He became Minister of Planning and International Cooperation during Transitional federal government (TFG). Jurile was twice or more a Member of the Federal Parliament's lower house, before moving to the Upper House of the Parliament of Somalia in October 2016.

Jurile was a founding member of Puntland state, and served as Managing Director of the UN and other international organizations. During 2013 he declared his candidacy for the Prime Minister, and once ran for Somali Parliament speaker during the general election in 2014.

He served as a professor both local and International universities.

== Early life ==
Jurile was born in the coastal town of Bosaso Somalia hails from Dishiishe clan of Darod confederations.

Abdirizak is originally from the semi autonomous Puntland region in northeastern Somalia. He holds Somali and British citizenship. He is multilingual, fluent in Somali, English, Italian and Arabic.
