= 2015 Makka al-Mukarama hotel attack =

2015 Al-Shabaab attack in Mogadishu, Somalia

- Part of Somali Civil War (2009–present)
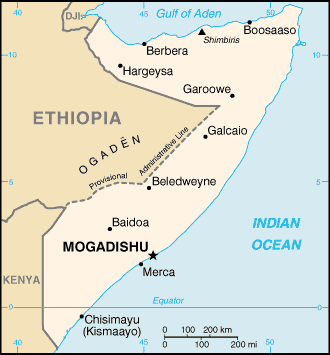
- Location of Mogadishu in Somalia
- Location: 02°02′03″N 45°19′17″E; Makka Al-mukarama road, Mogadishu, Somalia
- Date: 27 March 2015; 17:00 (local time) (UTC+03:00)
- Attack type: Suicide car bombing, shooting
- Weapons: Explosives, guns
- Deaths: more than 20
- Injuries: 28
- Perpetrator: Al-Shabaab

On 27 March 2015, Al-Shabaab militants launched an attack on the Makka al-Mukarama hotel in Mogadishu, Somalia. The siege ended a few hours later on 28 March, after the National Intelligence and Security Agency's Gaashaan unit stormed the premises, recaptured it, and killed all five of the attackers. According to the Ministry of Information, around 20 people died during the standoff, including the perpetrators, security forces, hotel security guards and some civilians, with around 28 wounded. The special forces also rescued more than 50 hotel guests. President of Somalia Hassan Sheikh Mohamud ordered an investigation into the attack, and the Ministry of Information announced that the federal government was slated to pass new laws to curb illicit firearms. On 8 May, the Makka al-Mukarama hotel officially reopened after having undergone renovations.

== Incident ==
On 27 March 2015, Al-Shabaab insurgents attacked the Hotel Makka Al Mukarama in Mogadishu. After a left-hand drive Toyota Noah laden with an improvised explosive device detonated, five armed militants penetrated the grounds in another vehicle. The blast shattered the mirrors inside the hotel. A number of government officials were staying at the hotel at the time, which was also patronized by foreigners. The attackers stormed into the hotel room levels on the first, second and third floors, and held several occupants hostage. Hotel guests locked themselves in their rooms and notified the security forces of their location. The National Intelligence and Security Agency's elite Gaashaan unit subsequently stormed the grounds and began engaging the militants. The ensuing standoff lasted four hours. The security forces succeeded in rescuing more than 50 hotel guests, including Somalia's Ambassador to Germany Mohamed Tifow, who was saved by ladder.

According to government representatives, all five of the attackers were killed, including both the gunmen and the suicide car bomber. Somali Minister of Information Mohamed Hayir Maareeye also indicated that four government soldiers, four hotel guards and five civilians were killed, as well as a female Ministry of Finance advisor, and World Bank official Farhiya Bashir Nur, who had been serving as a consultant to the Central Bank of Somalia. Somalia Ambassador to the UN Human Rights Office in Geneva, Switzerland, Yusuf Mohamed Ismail ("Bari-Bari"), was rushed to the hospital, and later died of the injuries he had sustained. Casualties included 28 wounded soldiers, state officials and hotel personnel.

The Information Minister suggested that Al-Shabaab had intended to hold up the Makka al-Mukarama hotel for days and kill many civilians as they had previously done at the Westgate shopping mall in Nairobi in 2013, but Somali government forces succeeded in stopping their plans. The hotel's owner Gurey Abdi Hassan partly blamed Hodan district officials and state forces for the attack. He indicated that the local Hodan district commissioner had ignored his request to set up a security checkpoint in the hotel's rear, while simultaneously providing lax security despite the premises having been attacked three times before. Al-Shabaab concurrently claimed responsibility for the raid, with the group's spokesman Sheikh Ali Mahamud Rage emailing that some militants had survived the attack and escaped the scene. Al Shabaab's military operations spokesman Abdiasis Abu Musab also indicated that the insurgents were targeting government officials only and had left civilians unharmed. Government forces displayed the bodies of the dead militants at a press gathering, deeming the counter-terrorist operation a success.

Government forces and AMISOM troops subsequently cordoned off roads, flanking the hotel. On 29 March 2015, the Ministry of Security also chaired a meeting in the Maka Al-Mukarrama hotel, where National Intelligence and Security Agency officials, National Women Association representatives, clerics and civil society members discussed ways to strengthen security, prevent terrorist attacks, and rapidly defuse them should they occur. The Ministry of Information concurrently announced that the federal government was slated to pass new laws to curb illicit firearms in the capital.

On 29 March, a state funeral for Ambassador Ismail was held in his birthplace Garowe, the administrative capital of the autonomous Puntland regional state. The funeral service was attended by Puntland President Abdiweli Mohamed Ali and federal government delegates.

== Reactions ==
President Hassan Sheikh Mohamud commended the security forces for their competence, described the attack as futile and spineless, and vowed to continue the ongoing reconstruction and development process unimpeded. He also instructed the national security agencies to immediately launch a probe into the attack. Puntland President Abdiweli Mohamed Ali and former Puntland President Abdirahman Farole likewise sent their condolences to Ambassador Ismail's family, and wished the injured parties a rapid recovery. Farole also accused the central government forces of having neglected to effectively protect federal officials. Additionally, UN Special Representative for Somalia Nicholas Kay and AMISOM condemned the attack, and extended their condolences to the families of the victims. U.S. State Department spokeswoman Marie Harf in turn applauded the Somali security forces for their rapid actions, and reaffirmed her administration's support for the Federal Government of Somalia's development initiatives. The United Nations Human Rights Council also observed a minute of silence in honour of Ismail, with President of the Council Ambassador Joachim Rücker describing the late diplomat as a widely admired and respected leadership figure.

== Relaunch ==
On 8 May 2015, the Makka al-Mukarama hotel officially reopened for business after having undergone refurbishments.

== See also ==
- 2015 timeline of the War in Somalia
- Somali Civil War (2009–present)
