= Garowe attack =

2015 bombing of a convoy by Islamist militants in Garowe, Puntland, Somalia

2015 Garowe attack
- Part of the Somali Civil War (2009–present)
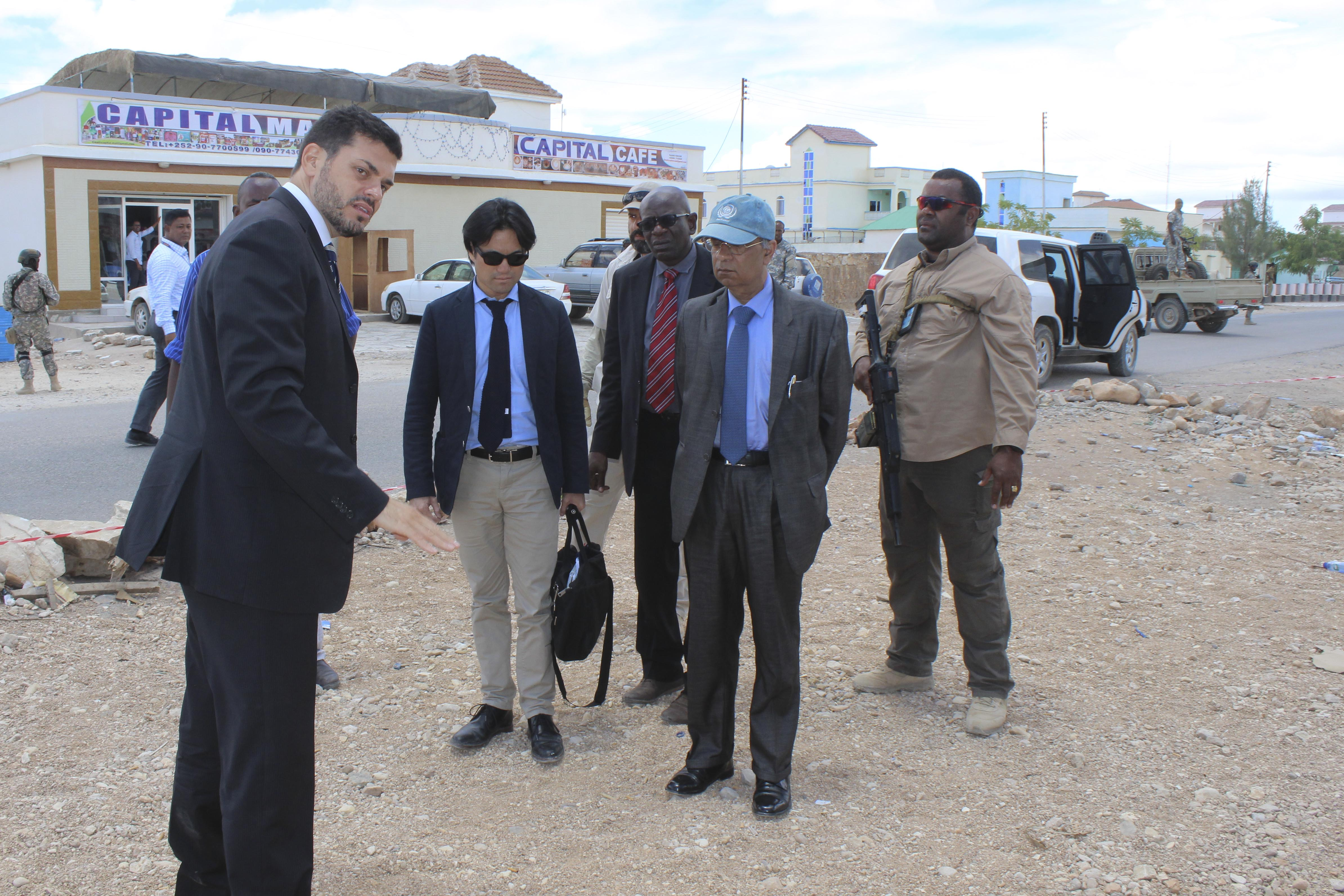
- Atul Khare, UN Under-Secretary-General, visiting the site of the suicide attack on May 1, 2015
- Location: 4°44′05″N 45°11′50″E; Garowe, Puntland, Somalia
- Date: 20 April 2015; 11 years ago (UTC+03:00)
- Attack type: Bombing
- Weapon: Remote control bomb
- Deaths: 7-10
- Injuries: 8
- Perpetrator: Al-Shabaab

The Garowe attack was a bombing of a UN van in Garowe, Puntland, Somalia. Between 7 and 10 people were killed, including the attacker and four UNICEF workers. The Al-Shabaab militant group claimed responsibility for the blast. The Puntland administration subsequently appointed a governmental committee to probe the circumstances surrounding the attack, and apprehended over a dozen suspects.

== Overview ==
On 20 April 2015, militants planted a bomb in a UN van in the northeastern city of Garowe, the administrative capital of the autonomous Puntland regional state of Somalia. According to police Colonel Ali Salad, at least seven workers were killed in the ensuing blast, including three Somali nationals, two Kenyans, one Afghan and one Ugandan. Four of the slain officials were UNICEF workers. Police commander Ahmed Abdullahi Samatar suggested that the attacker was among the dead. Additionally, UN Special Representative for Somalia Nicholas Kay indicated that two guards were among the dead. Unconfirmed witness reports suggested that 10 people died. Four Somali nationals, one American, one Sierra Leonean, one Kenyan and one Ugandan were also injured. Police officer Yusuf Ali indicated that the explosive device was lodged under a seat in the vehicle and detonated via remote control.

The Al-Shabaab militant group later claimed responsibility for the attack through its radio station. President of Somalia Hassan Sheikh Mohamud, Ambassador Kay, and Puntland Vice President Abdihakim Abdullahi Haji Omar all condemned the bombing and sent their condolences to the families of the deceased. Mohamud also suggested that such attacks against small, soft targets demonstrated that Al-Shabaab was near its end, and urged vigilance and cooperation with the Puntland security forces to ensure that the nationwide reconstruction and development process continued unabated. Omar likewise described the blast as futile and indicated that it would not derail the region's stability. The Puntland administration subsequently appointed a five-member governmental committee to probe the circumstances surrounding the attack.

On 25 April, Puntland police apprehended over a dozen individuals in connection with the UN van attack. According to Nugal province commander Colonel Ahmed Abdullahi Samatar, the suspects were being interrogated at the police headquarters. He also indicated that the results of the probe had been entrusted to an oversight committee, that the security situation was stable, and that new community policing centers were scheduled to be established.

== See also ==
- 2015 timeline of the War in Somalia
- Somali Civil War (2009–present)
