= Abdulcadir Gabeire Farah =

Abdulcadir Gabeire
- Born: 1955
- Died: September 21, 2015 (aged 59–60)
- Citizenship: Somalia, Poland
- Education: Omdurman University
- Occupations: Historian, activist, politician

Abdulcadir Gabeire Farah (1955 – September 21, 2015) was a Somali-born Polish historian and social activist. He was the co-founder and President of the Foundation for Somalia, based in Poland. Farah had announced his intention to run for President of Somalia in the upcoming presidential election, scheduled for 2016. Farah was killed in a terrorist attack in Mogadishu on September 21, 2015, while preparing for his presidential campaign.

== Education ==
Farah graduated from the Omdurman University, now called Omdurman Islamic University, in Sudan. He spoke fluent Arabic, English, Polish, Somali and Swahili.

== Career ==
Farah immigrated from Somalia to Poland in the 1990s, becoming the first African immigrant to receive refugee status in Poland since the collapse of the Communist government in 1989. Though he knew virtually no one in Poland, Farah chose the country because it was the polar opposite of Somalia, which was engulfed in the chaos of the Somali Civil War during the 1990s. He initially found his new country to be isolating and distant. There were instances when elderly Polish women, who associated dark skin with the devil, fled when they saw him. Farah sought to learn the Polish language and reach out to the larger community through social activism.

He co-founded the Foundation for Somalia (Fundacja dla Somalii), headquartered in Poland, with Jolanta Opalińska in 2007. Farah became the President of the Foundation in October 2010. The Foundation's initial goal was to fundraise for the renovation of a hospital in Adado, located in the Galguduud region of central Somalia, as well as to provide funding for a children's home in Godenlabe. However, Farah expanded to the Foundation's mission to include programs and services not just for Somalis and other African immigrants, but for all migrant communities in Poland, regardless of country of origin. His organization offers computer classes, Polish language training and other professional courses to help integrate immigrants into Polish society, as well as improve relations with ethnic Poles. Under Farah, the Foundation for Somalia also undertook humanitarian projects in Somalia and Poland.

Farah also taught as a lecturer at the Institute for Social Studies, a college in Yemen.

He obtained Polish citizenship in 2014.

In May 2015, Farah announced his intention to run for President of Somalia in the forthcoming Somali presidential election in 2016. He returned to Somalia to prepare for his presidential campaign. If elected, he would have been Somalia's first President to hold dual Polish citizenship. According to TVP Info, a Polish news channel, Farah's candidacy enjoyed as much as 70% approval among Somali voters, making him a credible presidential candidate in the election, which is scheduled for 2016.

== Death ==
Abdulcadir Gabeire Farah was killed in a car bomb attack on the grounds of the Somalian Presidential Palace on September 21, 2015. Farah had been in Mogadishu to preparation for his presidential bid. The bombing, which was blamed on the Al-Shabaab terrorist group, killed at least eleven people, including Farah and a second Polish citizen, and injured at least 22 other victims. A delegation from the United Nations, which may have been the intended targets of the attack, escaped unharmed.
