= 2015 Ministry of Higher Education attack =

Terrorist incident in Somalia

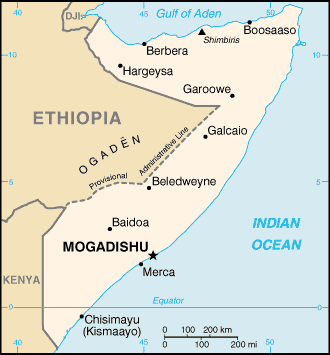
- Location of Mogadishu in Somalia
- Location: Mogadishu, Somalia
- Date: 14 April 2015
- Attack type: Suicide bombing, shooting
- Deaths: 17

On 14 April 2015, Al-Shabaab militants launched a suicide car bomb and shooting attack on the Ministry of Higher Education and Ministry of Petroleum and Resources building in Mogadishu. Special forces quickly reseized the compound, killing the attackers.

== Overview ==
The attack began when a suicide car bomb detonated at the gate of the Ministry of Higher Education and Ministry of Petroleum and Resources building in Mogadishu. The compound is situated near the KM4 junction, which was often used by government officials during travels to and from the country. Armed insurgents in military fatigues subsequently penetrated the premises. However, no senior government officials were on the grounds. According to witnesses, there were between two or three gunmen, who were armed with light and heavy weapons and had on suicide vests.

Special Forces units arrived at the compound shortly afterwards, and quickly recaptured control of the area after a brief exchange in gunfire with the militants. Interior Minister Abdirizak Omar indicated that the security forces also rescued dozens of individuals. Additionally, a federal government spokesman stated that casualties included seven Al-Shabaab militants, eight pedestrians and two soldiers. Around 15 people were also wounded and were taken to the hospital for treatment.

Al-Shabaab later claimed responsibility for the attack. Analysts suggested that the fact that the group had begun resorting to raids against soft targets reflected its structural weakness, as the militants were no longer able to mount large counterstrikes against Somali army and AMISOM positions.

== See also ==
- 2015 timeline of the War in Somalia
