= Central Hotel attack =

2015 terrorist incident in Mogadishu, Somalia

2015 Central Hotel attack
- Part of Somali Civil War (2009–present)
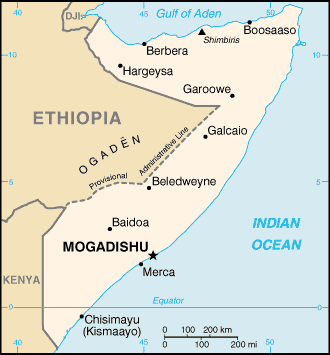
- Location of Mogadishu in Somalia
- Location: Mogadishu, Somalia
- Date: 20 February 2015
- Attack type: Suicide bombings, mass shooting
- Deaths: 11-25
- Injuries: 37

On 20 February 2015, Al-Shabaab militants launched a surprise attack on the Central Hotel in Mogadishu, Somalia, where various Federal Government of Somalia officials had gathered for Friday prayers at the compound's mosque. Between 11 and 25 people were killed, including the suicide bomber, local deputy mayor and two MPs. The Federal Cabinet subsequently announced the formation of a security committee to probe the circumstances surrounding the attack, as well as a ministerial committee to follow up on the situation. Security forces thereafter apprehended a number of suspects, and deployed more police and soldiers onto the city's main roads.

== Overview ==
On 20 February 2015, a vehicle laden with explosives smashed into the gate of the Central Hotel in Mogadishu. Gunmen then penetrated the premises and opened fire in the hotel's mosque. Police Major Nur Mohamed indicated that a suicide bomber also blew himself up within the complex.

According to police, at least 11 people were killed in the attack, with a number of others injured. A presidential palace official suggested that the fatalities totaled over 25 people, including the Deputy Governor for Political Affairs of the Benadir region Mohamed Adan Guleed. Federal Parliament General Secretary Abdikariim Hajji Abdi Buuh subsequently confirmed that legislators Omar Ali Furdug and Mohamud Duaale were also among the dead, while MP Abdikadir Ali Omar sustained injuries. Additionally, Minister of Information Mohamed Hayir Maareeye stated that Deputy Prime Minister Mohamed Omar Arte and other federal ministers were at the time in the compound, but survived the raid.

An Al-Shabaab spokesman later claimed responsibility for the attack, asserting that the militants had targeted the officials during prayer-time as retribution for "apostasy" and for deploying foreign African Union troops in Somalia. Security subsequently cordoned off the area around the hotel. President of Somalia Hassan Sheikh Mohamoud, the Somali Forum for Unity and Democracy, UN Secretary-General Ban Ki-moon, UN Special Representative for Somalia Nicholas Kay, OIC Secretary-General Iyad bin Amin Madani, EU High Representative Federica Mogherini, President of the UAE Sheikh Khalifa bin Zayed Al Nahyan, Minister of Foreign Affairs of Canada Rob Nicholson, and US State Department Spokesperson Jen Psaki also issued statements condemning the attack, sent their condolences to the families of the victims, and vowed to continue their reconstructive and developmental work.

The Federal Cabinet subsequently convened and announced the formation of a security committee to probe the circumstances surrounding the attack, as well as a ministerial committee to follow up on the situation. A few hours later, state forces launched a citywide security sweep and apprehended 12 Al-Shabaab suspects for interrogation, among which were the hotel's security guards. The municipal police was also placed on high alert, and additional military soldiers were stationed on the major thoroughfares.

== See also ==
- 2015 timeline of the War in Somalia
