= Abdihamid Sheikh Abdisalam Isse =

Abdihamid Sheikh Abdisalam Isse عبدالحميد الشيخ عبدالسلام عيسي
- Born: Garowe, Puntland, Somalia
- Occupation: Politician
- Title: Deputy Speaker of Puntland Parliament

Abdihamid Sheikh Abdisalam Isse (Arabic: عبدالحميد الشيخ عبدالسلام عيسي (Somali: C/xamiid Sheekh C/salaam Ciise) is a Somalian politician. He is the former Deputy Speaker of the House of Representatives of Puntland.

== Biography ==
Isse was born in Garowe, the capital city of Puntland State of Somalia, the eldest of nine siblings. His mother's name is Halima Osman and his father's name is Abdisalam Isse.
