= Yusuf Bari-Bari =

Somali diplomat (1958 – 2015)

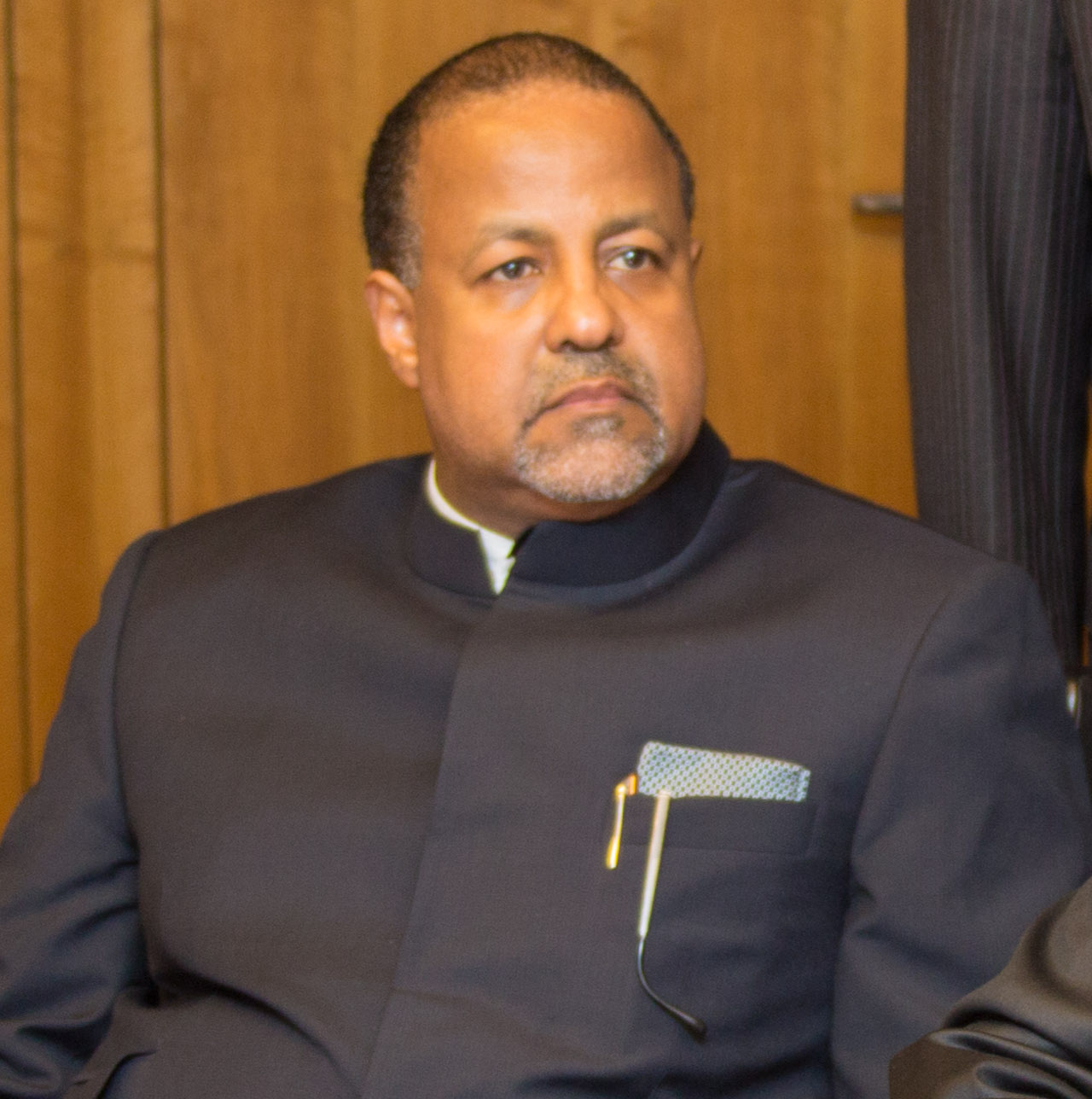

Ambassador of Somalia to the United Nations Human Rights Office
- In office 2008 – 27 March 2015
- Prime Minister: Omar Abdirashid Ali Sharmarke
- Succeeded by: Faduma Abdullahi Mohamud

Personal details
- Born: Yusuf Mohamed Ismail Bari-Bari يوسف محمد إسماعيل; 15 July 1958 Bologna, Italy
- Died: 27 March 2015 (aged 56) Mogadishu, Somalia
- Party: Independent
- Education: University of Bologna

Yusuf Mohamed Ismail Bari-Bari (Somali: Yuusuf Maxamed Ismaaciil Bari-Bari, Arabic: يوسف محمد إسماعيل; 15 July 1958 – 27 March 2015) was a Somali diplomat and politician. He was the Ambassador of Somalia to the United Nations Human Rights Office in Geneva.

== Personal life ==
Bari-Bari was born in 1958 in Rome, Italy to an aristocratic Somali family. He belonged to the Majeerteen Harti Darod clan. His family originally hailed from Garowe, the administrative capital of the northeastern Puntland regional state of Somalia.

For his tertiary education, Bari-Bari earned a degree in political science from the University of Bologna.

== Career ==
Professionally, Bari-Bari joined the diplomatic service. He was appointed Ambassador of Somalia to the United Nations Human Rights Office in Geneva, Switzerland in 2008. In this capacity, Bari-Bari worked to promote and protect human rights in his country of origin and around the world. Through his work with civil society groups, he is credited with having helped to establish the council's Independent Expert on Albinism, a global panel that was formed in 2015.

On 27 March 2015, Yusuf Ismail Bari-Bari sustained injuries during an attack on Hotel Makka al-Mukarama in Mogadishu by the Al-Shabaab militant group. He later succumbed to the wounds at the hospital.

President of Somalia Hassan Sheikh Mohamud, Puntland President Abdiweli Mohamed Ali, former Puntland President Abdirahman Farole, and UN Special Representative for Somalia Nicholas Kay all sent their condolences to the slain diplomat's family. The United Nations Human Rights Council also observed a minute of silence in honour of Ismail. President of the Council Ambassador Joachim Rücker described Ismail as a widely admired and respected leadership figure, whose commitment to global human rights left a tangible impact.

On 29 March, a state funeral for Ambassador Ismail Bari-Bari was held in Garowe. The funeral service was attended by Puntland President Ali and various Federal Government of Somalia delegates.
