= Abdiaziz Nur Elmi Koor =

Somali politician

Abdiaziz Nur Elmi Koor عبد العزيز نور علمي كور
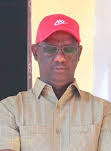

Mayor of Garowe
- In office 23 September 2009 – 8 June 2015
- Preceded by: Abdulkadir Osman Food Adde
- Succeeded by: Ahmed Said Gelle Shoodhe

Personal details
- Born: Garowe

Abdiaziz Nur Elmi Koor (Somali: Cabdiaziz Nuur Elmi Koor, Arabic: عبد العزيز نور علمي كور) is the former mayor of Garowe, the administrative capital of the autonomous state of Puntland. He was first appointed as a caretaker mayor by President Farole in September 2009, as he succeeded Abdulkadir Osman Food Adde. Koor was later officially elected by the Garowe local council and served until 2015, when he was succeeded by Ahmed Said Gelle Shoode.
