= Ministry of Youth and Sports (Somalia) =

Government ministry of Somalia

Ministry Youth and Sports of Somalia
- Wasaaradda Dhallinyarada iyo Ciyaaraha
- Coat of arms of Somalia

Agency overview
- Formed: 2012
- Jurisdiction: Somalia
- Headquarters: Mogadishu
- Agency executive: Mohamed Abdulkadir Ali, Minister of Sports
- Parent agency: Cabinet of Somalia

The Ministry of Youth and Sports is a ministry responsible for sports and athletics-related provisions within Somalia. The current Minister of Youth and Sports is Mohamed Abdulkadir Ali.

== See also ==
- Agriculture in Somalia
