= Garowe–Bosaso Highway =

Highway in Somalia

Garowe-Bosaso Highway
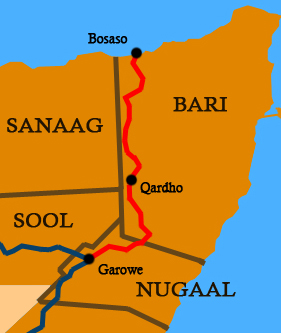

Route information
- Length: 279.1 mi (449.2 km)
- Existed: 1988–present

Major junctions
- From: Bosaso
- To: Garowe

Location
- Country: Somalia

Highway system
- Transport in Somalia

The Garowe–Bosaso Highway is a major thoroughfare in the autonomous Puntland region in northeastern Somalia. It connects the administrative capital of Garowe with the commercial hub of Bosaso, a distance of around 450 km (279.1 mi).

== Overview ==
The Garowe–Bosaso Highway was constructed in 1988, after an Italian firm Merzario had been contracted to build the main trunk road, including its culverts and bridges. Its tarmac was later completed in 1990. Abdirizak Jurile was responsible administratively and operationally to build The Garowe–Bosaso Highway.

In the Bari province, the highway starts from the Port of Bosaso and continues south as a single carriageway, up over the Al-Miskat hills and downwards toward Qardho. It continues from there around 205 km (127.6 mi) southwards to Garowe, whereafter the thoroughfare joins the Mogadishu–Berbera highway in neighbouring Somaliland.

In June 2012, the Puntland Highway Authority (PHA) began an upgrade and repair project on the large Garowe–Bosaso Highway. Additionally, plans are in the works to construct new roads connecting littoral towns in the region to the main thoroughfare.

In June 2014, the PHA started a major rehabilitation project to repair parts of the road that had incurred structural damage during the previous year's cyclone. Scheduled repairs total around $389,498 USD, and include overall reinforcement of the culverts and concrete wing-walls, overall construction of the masonry works and gabion boxes, and construction of the check dam retain walls. Alongside Jidbali road, the Garowe-Bosaso highway is one of the main paths from the Nugaal to the north.

== See also ==
- Transportation in Somalia
