= Mohamed Hayir Maareeye =

Somali politician

Minister of Agriculture and Irrigation
- Incumbent
- Assumed office 29 January 2024
- President: Hassan Sheikh Mohamud
- Prime Minister: Hamza Abdi Barre
- Preceded by: Ahmed Madobe Nunow

Minister of Information
- In office 6 February 2015 – 29 March 2017
- President: Hassan Sheikh Mohamud
- Prime Minister: Omar Abdirashid Ali Sharmarke
- Succeeded by: Abdirahman Omar Osman

Personal details
- Born: Somalia
- Party: Independent

Mohamed Hayir Maareeye is a Somali politician who has served as Minister of Agriculture and Irrigation of Somalia since 29 January 2024. He served also as the former Minister of Information of Somalia, having been appointed to the position on 6 February 2015 by the now former Prime Minister Omar Abdirashid Ali Sharmarke.
