= Shire (disambiguation) =

A shire is a type of regional division in the United Kingdom and other English-speaking nations.

Shire may also refer to:

== Places ==
=== UK ===
- Four Shire Stone, where four English counties once met each other
- Shire Brook, in South Yorkshire, England
- Shire Country Park, a park south of Birmingham, England
- The Shires, a collective term for the counties of England ending in shire or rural England in general; see Shire § "The Shires"

=== US ===
- Shires of Virginia, local government units in the U.S. state
- The Shire or New Hampshire, informal designation of the U.S. state

=== Other ===
- Shire, Ethiopia, a town and a district in Tigray region
- Shire, Mawal, a village in Mawal taluka, Pune district, Maharashtra, India
- Shire Highlands, a plateau in southern Malawi east of the Shire River
- Shire River, a river in Malawi and Mozambique
- Apostolic Vicariate of Shire, a Roman Catholic territorial jurisdiction in what was then Nyasaland Protectorate (now Malawi)
- The Shire or Sutherland Shire, a suburban region of southern Sydney, Australia

== Buildings ==
- Shire Hall, Monmouth, Wales, a building
- Shire Hall, Newport, Wales, a building

== Enterprises ==
- Shire Books, a British publisher of books on history, heritage and antiques
- Shire Foods, a manufacturer of pies, pasties, and sausage rolls based in Warwickshire, England
- Shire (pharmaceutical company), a British speciality pharmaceuticals company

== Literature ==
- The Shire, a region in J. R. R. Tolkien's Middle-earth legendarium
- The Shires, a 1974 poetry collection by Donald Davie

== Music ==
- The Shires (duo), a British country music duo
- The Shire (soundtrack), part of the soundtrack of The Fellowship of the Ring

== Names ==
- Shire (name), a traditional Somali name, including a list of people with the name
- Shires (surname), including a list of people with the name

== Shopping centres ==
- The Shires, former name of the English shopping centre now known as Highcross Leicester
- The Shires Shopping Centre, in Trowbridge, Wiltshire, England

== Other uses ==
- Battle of Shire (1936), a battle of the Second Italo-Abyssinian War
- Battle of Shire (2022), a battle of the Tigray War
- East Stirlingshire F.C. or the Shire, a Scottish football club
- Shire horse, a large breed of draft horse
- The Shire (TV series), an Australian reality television series

== See also ==
- Shier, a surname
- Shyer, a surname
