= Farah Ali Jama =

Puntland politician

Farah Ali Jama فرح علي جامع
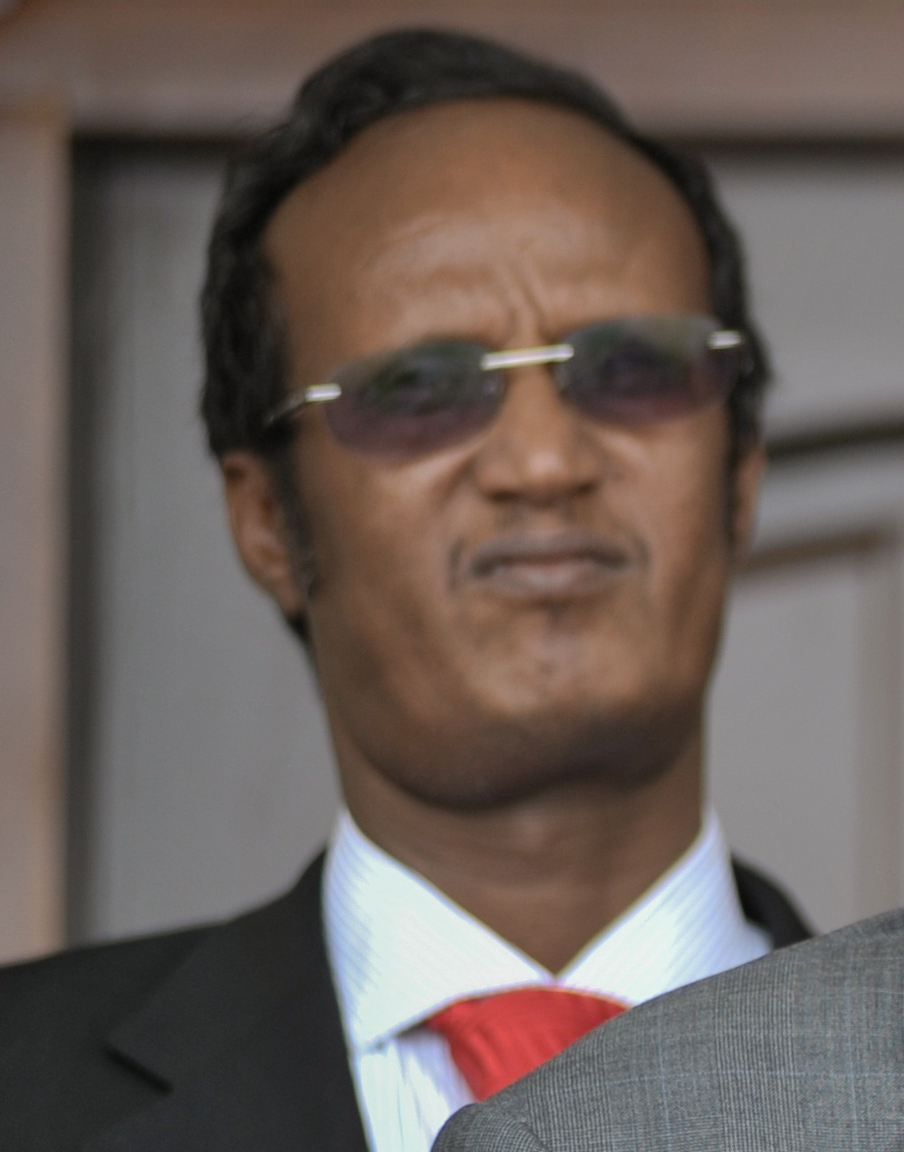

Puntland Minister of Finance
- In office 28 January 2009 – 28 January 2014
- President: Abdirahman Farole
- Vice President: Abdisamad Ali Shire
- Preceded by: Mohamed Ali Yusuf
- Succeeded by: Shire Haji Farah

Personal details
- Born: Bosaso, Majeerteeniya
- Party: Mideeye

Farah Ali Jama also known as Farah Ali Shire (Somali: Faarax Cali Jaamac, Arabic: فرح علي جامع) is a Puntland economist and politician. During Presidency of Abdirahman Farole from January 2009 to January 2014, he served as the Puntland Minister of Finance.

== Personal life ==
Jama hails from Bari region of Puntland and he joined Mideeye political party in 2020. He belongs to the Ali Suleiman sub-clan of the Majeerteen Darod clan.

Jama was previously stationed in Australia.

== Minister of Finance ==
=== Appointment ===
On 28 January 2009, Jama was appointed Puntland's Minister of Finance.

=== Garowe Airport Project ===
Through its representative to Kuwait, Faisal Hawar, the Puntland government signed an agreement in Dubai with a Kuwaiti company for the development of facilities at the Garowe International Airport as well as at Maakhir University. The deal was valued at $10 million USD and was financed by the Kuwait Fund for Arab Economic Development (KFAED). In October 2013, Jama and KFAED Deputy Director Hamad Al-Omar signed a follow-up Grant Agreement in Kuwait. The pact will see the Fund extend $10 million USD, of which $6 million will be allocated to finance the Garowe Airport Project and the remainder will be earmarked for the Maakhir University Project.

=== End of term ===
On 28 January 2014, Jama's term as Puntland Minister of Finance ended. He was succeeded at the position by Shire Haji Farah.

=== Candidacy of Puntland presidential election ===
Jama run President of Puntland three consecutive elections 2009, 2014 and 2019 none of them was succeeded.

== See also ==
- Abdulkadir Abdi Hashi
