= 2014 Puntland presidential election =

- 8 January 2014
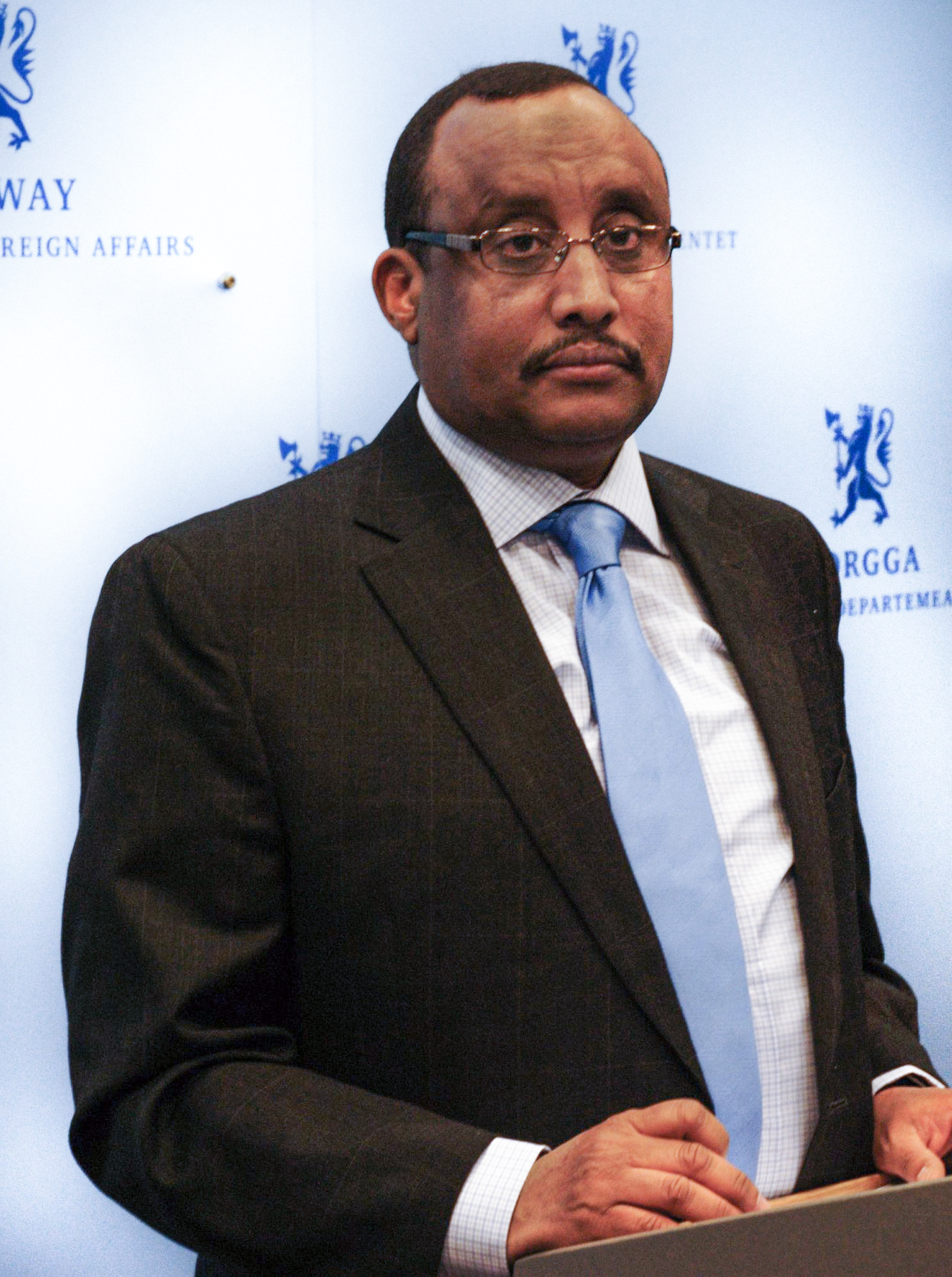

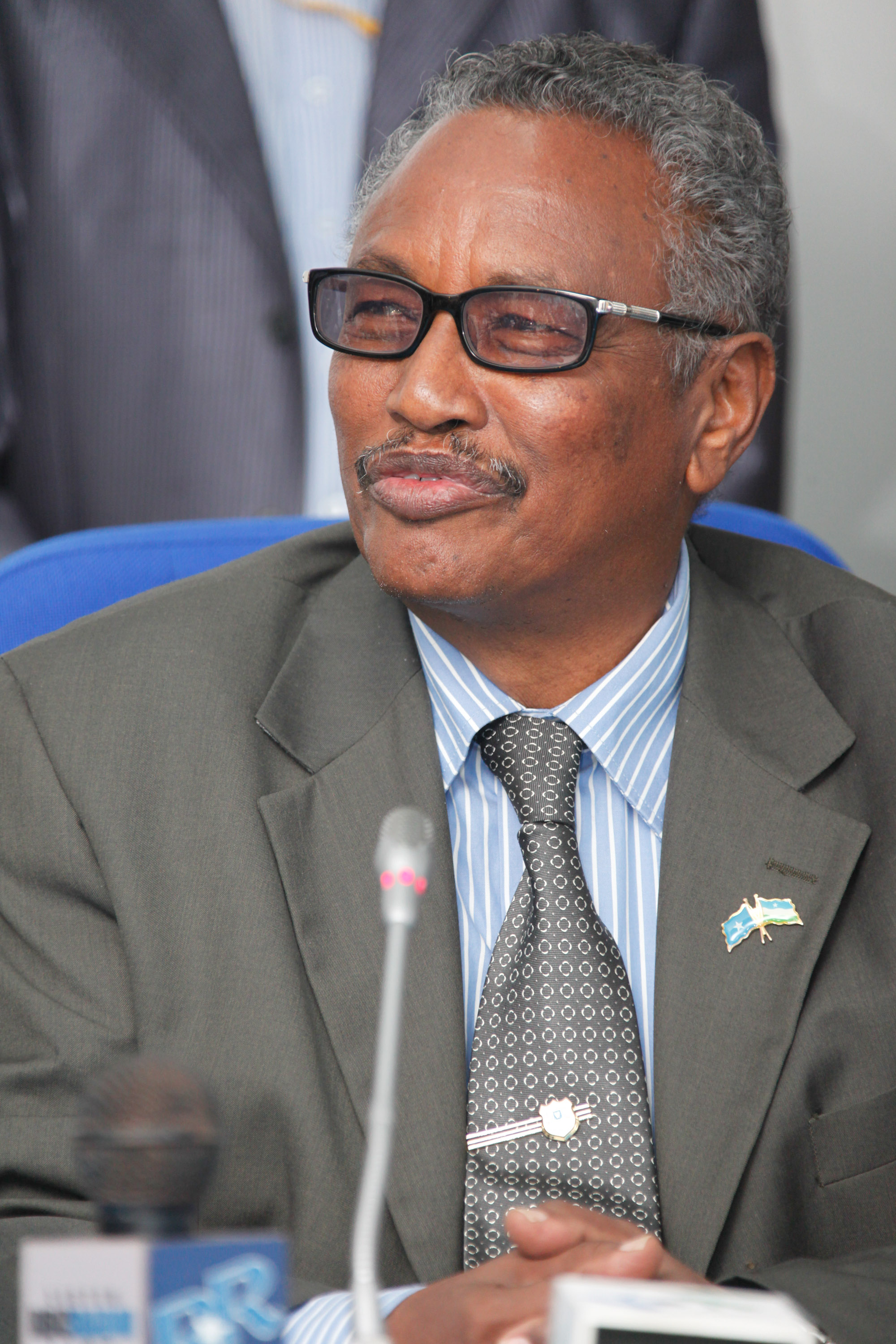
Nominee	Abdiweli Gaas	Abdirahman Farole
Party	UDAD	Horseed
Electoral vote	33	32
President before election
Abdirahman Farole
Elected President
Abdiweli Gaas

The 2014 Puntland presidential election was held on 8 January 2014 in Garowe, the administrative capital of the autonomous Puntland region in northeastern Somalia. The third such vote to be held in the state since its formation in 1998, it followed the election of a new Parliament Speaker and Deputy Speakers on 4 January 2014 by the 66-seat regional legislature. Candidates included officials from the incumbent Puntland administration, former government ministers and prominent local entrepreneurs. The ballot saw the election of former prime minister of Somalia Abdiweli Gaas as the fifth president of Puntland, narrowly defeating the incumbent Abdirahman Farole. Parliament of Puntland concurrently elected Abdihakim Abdullahi Haji Omar as Puntland's new vice president in place of Abdisamad Ali Shire.

== Democratization process ==
=== Registration phase ===
On 15 June 2009, the Puntland government passed a new regional draft constitution, representing a significant step toward the eventual introduction of a multi-party political system to the region for the first time.

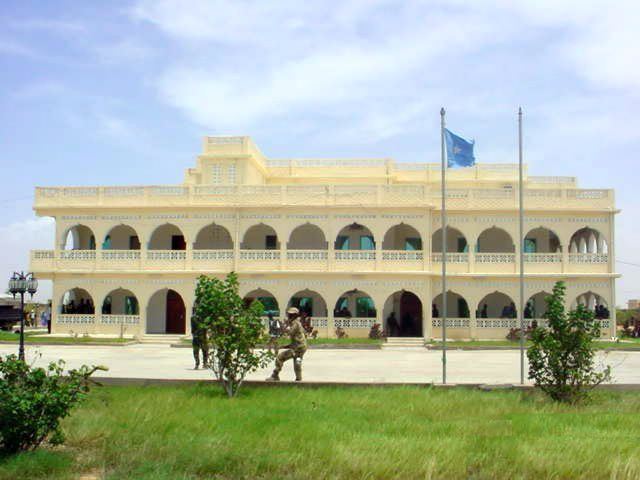
Presidential palace in Bosaso.

On 15 April 2012, the Puntland government opened a four-day constitutional convention officially inaugurating the new state constitution. Overseen by the Puntland Electoral Commission (PEC), the constitution represented the final step in the extant regional democratization process and was scheduled to be followed by the formation of political parties.

On 28 June 2012, the Parliament of Puntland formally legalized political parties.

On 12 September 2012, the Puntland Election Commission announced that the registration process for political parties in Puntland was now open. This came after the passing of the Political Association Law, the Referendum Act, the District Elections Law and the inauguration of the state constitution. With District Council elections slated for early 2013, the three political organizations that have earned the most seats across 21 demarcated districts will then constitute the region's official parties. They will also be challengers in the next elections, scheduled for January 2014.

On 12 November 2012, Members of the Puntland State Parliament amended the Puntland Electoral Law after convening in the administrative capital of Garowe. The amendment lowers the minimum required number of votes that each political association must secure per province from 500 to 300. It also stipulates that parties should have bureaus open in all of Puntland's eight regions.

=== Screening phase ===
On 3 December 2013, President Farole nominated a seven-member Vetting and Conflict Resolution Committee and a Secretary to oversee the month's parliamentary selection process ahead of the January 2014 presidential elections. The committee is chaired by an individual from a community not competing for the President, Vice President, Speaker or Deputy Speaker positions, and includes three Traditional Elders (Aqils). It excludes members of the dissolved Transitional Puntland Electoral Commission (TPEC). The committee's term is slated to expire once the new MPs have been sworn in.

On 5 December 2013, Puntland General Said Mohamed Hirsi (Dheere) announced that the Puntland Security Force would be in charge of security during the election process. Puntland troops would be stationed at the election hall, the administrative capital of Garowe and its surroundings, as well as Puntland at large. Additionally, Puntland forces would manage security for election candidates. Presidential hopefuls would also be allowed to have their own security detail, with Puntland troops available to provide additional protection if necessary. However, no non-governmental armed trucks would be allowed in Garowe. On 19 December, the Bari region governor Abdisamad Mohamed Galan also indicated that security reinforcements had been sent to Bosaso ahead of the elections to tighten up on safety after a suicide bomber had targeted government forces earlier in the month. According to Galan, the security situation in the city was calm and under control.

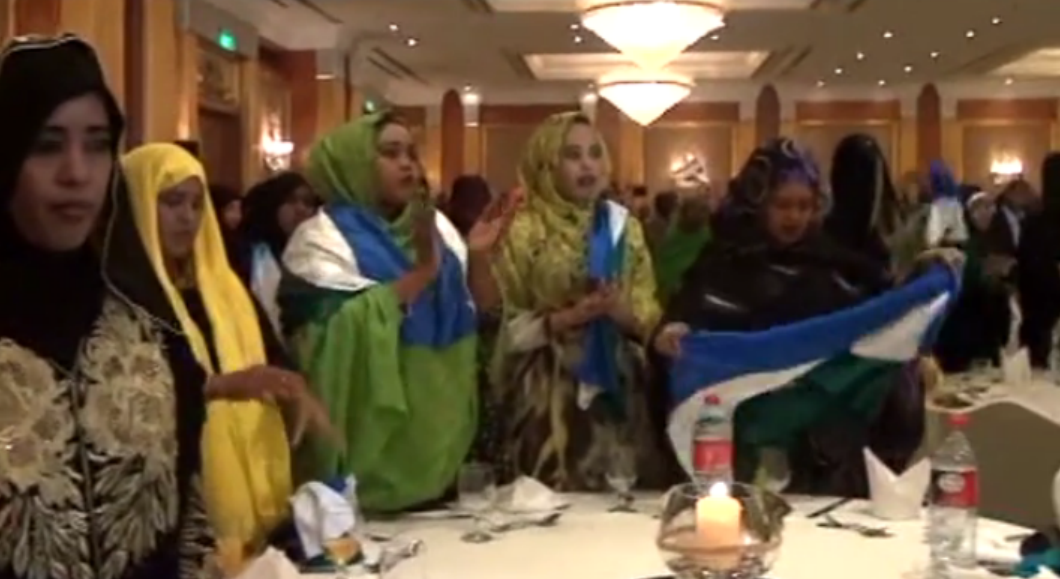
Somali women at a political function in Dubai in support of Shire Haji Farah's candidacy for President of Puntland (November 2013).

On 11 December 2013, Mohamud Ahmed Hassan, spokesman for the Vetting and Conflict Resolution Committee, announced that the body had begun receiving the list of parliamentary candidates approved by the traditional elders, an admission process that would be open until the 15th. Between 15 and 25 December, the committee would then start verifying the legislative nominees' credentials, including appraising the authenticity of the candidates' nomination letters and checking to make sure that they had obtained the appropriate elders' signatures. Identification cards would subsequently be printed for the chosen lawmakers, who would be sworn in with the presidential hopefuls present. By 1 January, the new MPs in Puntland's 66-seat parliament would hold their first session, and thereafter elect a president and vice president on the 8th.

On 16 December 2013, Suldan Saed Mohamed Garase chaired a meeting in Garowe of 27 prominent clan elders from Puntland's nine regions. The gathering ended in the announcement of the formation of an Election Monitoring Committee consisting of nine traditional leaders. With Suldan Bashir Musse Konte serving as Secretary, the oversight body was formed in accordance with the area's clans and constituencies. It is mandated with supervising the ongoing electoral process to ensure a fair and credible ballot on voting day.

On 17 December 2013, incumbent President Farole met with the 17 other Puntland presidential contenders at the State House in Garowe, after having extended an invitation to engage in dialogue over the upcoming elections. The group of presidential hopefuls presented four agenda points: that the incumbent administration and the opposition candidates should jointly appoint the Vetting and Conflict Resolution Committee; that a separate Elders Committee should also be formed; that both local and international observers should preside over the ballot; and that a Terms of Reference for the Vetting Committee and the proposed Elders Committee should be agreed upon. For his part, Farole proposed that he and the other contenders should jointly sign a Candidates Code of Conduct. The meeting ended with Farole accepting all of the other candidates' suggested amendments to the electoral process, except the proposal to co-nominate the Vetting Committee. The opposition candidates had sought a change in the committee's composition under the belief that three of the body's seats had been given to individuals who had previously run for Puntland president in the 2008 regional elections. Farole rejected the proposal on the grounds that nomination of the Vetting Committee was traditionally under governmental authority, noting that the committee members had hitherto been selected by Puntland's former presidents in the 1998, 2004 and 2008 elections. Former Puntland Security Minister, Abdullahi Saed Samatar, who was acting as the opposition candidates' chairman, subsequently called on the region's traditional elders and Islamic scholars to serve as mediators in the continuing talks.

On 20 December 2013, the Puntland authorities announced that the formal mediation process between the presidential contenders had begun, with prominent traditional leaders brokering the private meetings in Garowe. According to a government official, the discussions were likely to yield a breakthrough since both sides intimated that they would be willing to put aside their differences for the greater communal good.

On 25 December 2013, General Said Mohamed Hirsi (Gen. Said Dheere) announced that the Puntland state forces had completed the first phase of the election security plan, with the commanders of the Puntland defense forces' divisions meeting in Garowe to discuss the progress made and challenges encountered. He added that all of the presidential candidates had arrived in the city, and each had been offered equal safety protocols. Additionally, Hirsi stated that he had met in private with each contender to discuss their security detail and comprehensive protection. He also indicated that investigations had been launched into a gunfire incident in the state capital, and that the outcome of the probe would be made public within 12 hours. New command centers were also reportedly slated to be set up in Garowe's neighborhoods, and security is to be tightened around the Puntland Parliament building where the presidential election is scheduled to take place.

Puntland's state flag.

On 25 December 2013, the opposition candidates announced via a press statement that they had agreed to work with the Vetting and Conflict Resolution committee members. Two conditions were cited: that MPs are to be chosen in consultation with the traditional leaders who founded Puntland State in 1998, and any dispute that should arise during the legislative selection process is to be entrusted to clan elders who were involved in the previous 2008 Puntland election. The opposition spokesman Ali Haji Warsame also indicated that the contenders would work closely with the election security head, Puntland defense forces General Hirsi.

On 27 December 2013, at the conclusion of a five-day religious seminar (Nadwo) hosted by the Al-Minhaj Islamic organization at the Haji Ali Mosque in Garowe, 15 prominent local Islamic scholars signed a 21-point declaration on the upcoming 2014 Puntland elections. The agreement was intended to inform prospective holders of public office about their duties and the trust conferred upon them as civil servants. Among other things, it reminded the presidential contenders that they should campaign responsibly, avoid making unrealistic or false promises, uphold Puntland's previous agreements, policies and legislations that did not contravene Islamic principles, acknowledge the election result, and aim to work in the public interest. The scholars also encouraged the Titled Elders (Issimo) to work together in accordance with their acknowledged role as an authority in Puntland, and urged the public toward piety and unity. Additionally, the declaration reminded the Vetting Committee members of their public duties, and called on the would be legislators to work for the greater good. The declaration concluded by highlighting the responsibilities that would be expected of the new leaders in the Puntland government.

On 29 December 2013, incumbent President of Puntland Abdirahman Farole and his predecessor Mohamud Muse Hersi (Adde) met privately at the State House in Garowe to discuss the 2014 election process. Hersi subsequently announced at a joint press conference attended by Puntland Security Committee chairman Said Dheere and Nuradin Aden Dirie, senior adviser to UN Special Envoy to Somalia Ambassador Nicholas Kay, that the two presidential leaders agreed that credible elections would be held and that both averred to work with the victorious candidate. Hersi also stated that he would support the Vetting and Conflict Resolution Committee's parliamentary selections, and commended the Puntland administration, security chief Dheere and UN officials for their cooperation to strengthen security. Additionally, Farole appealed to the general public to uphold the peace, unity and solidarity in Puntland.

On 30 December 2013, the Vetting and Conflict Resolution Committee unveiled the 66 new Puntland legislators who are scheduled to select a new parliamentary speaker on 1 January 2014, as well as elect a new president on 8 January. The following day, Puntland presidential contender Ali Abdi Aware indicated in a joint press statement issued on behalf of all the opposition candidates that they were satisfied with the outcome of the parliamentary selection process. He also felicitated the new MPs on their appointment and expressed hope that they would work in the public's interest. Additionally, Aware commended the vetting committee's members for having efficiently completed their duties during the election's screening phase.

=== Election phase ===
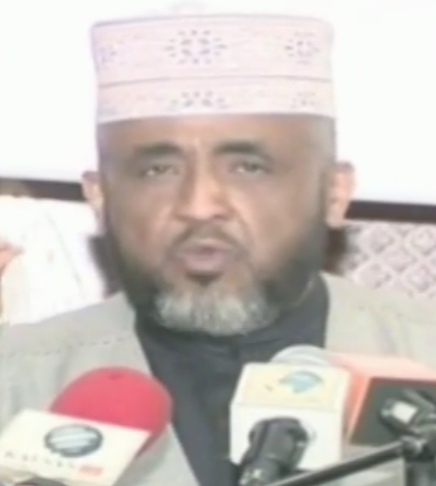
Early presidential candidate Haji Mohamed Yasin Ismail.

On 1 January 2014, the 66 newly appointed legislators were officially sworn into office at a ceremony held at the Garowe parliament building, which was attended by incumbent Puntland President Abdirahman Mohamed Farole, Vice President Gen. Abdisamad Ali Shire, former Puntland President Gen. Adde Muse Hersi, opposition presidential candidates, Vetting and Conflict Resolution Committee members, Muslim scholars, traditional leaders and international community officials. Vetting committee chairman Eng. Yusuf Abshir Adami briefed the attendees about the MP selection process, stating that his panel had endeavoured to choose the lawmakers with the objective of long-term sustainability. Presidential contender Ali Abdi Aware also expressed delight at the inauguration of the new legislators, and emphasized the importance of solidarity. Additionally, Hersi stated that he had faith in the oversight committee's judgement, and appealed to the MPs to select the right individual for the presidential office. At the conclusion of the swearing-in ceremony, the new Members of Parliament appointed Ali Ahmed Osman, the most senior legislator, as the interim speaker. The MPs were then slated to vote for a new speaker and election commission members during their next meetings.

On 2 January 2014, interim speaker Ali Ahmed Osman announced that the new lawmakers had selected five MPs for the parliamentary speaker's election committee.

On 3 January 2014, the campaign trail intensified as the incumbent and opposition candidates each began holding private meetings with the newly appointed legislators in order to secure supporters. Public opinion on the best possible candidate for the presidential office also reportedly varied, as the citizenry considered the political platforms and respective experience of each contender. Several candidates likewise dropped out of the race, including prominent businessman Haji Mohamed Yasin Ismail and former Puntland Finance Minister Mohamed Ali Yusuf "Gaagaab" the day before. Additionally, the Election Security Committee led by Gen. Said Mohamed Hirsi (Said Dheere) entered the second phase of its election security plan, establishing command posts in Garowe's neighborhoods ahead of the 8 January vote.

==== Speakership election ====
On 4 January 2014, Puntland's 66 new legislators met to elect a new Parliament Speaker at a session televised live from Garowe's parliament hall by Somali Channel TV. Five candidates vied for the post, including MPs Said Hassan Shire of the Sanaag/Haylaan region, Mohamed Ali Guled of Sanaag/Haylaan, Abdirashid Mohamed Hersi of the Mudug region, Abdihakim Mohamed Ahmed (Dhoobo) of Sanaag/Haylaan, and Ahmed Ali Hashi of Sanaag/Haylaan. The Election Committee, a parliamentary body chaired by lawmaker Saadiq Abshir Garaad, subsequently announced that MPs Shire and Hersi were the leading vote-getters during the first round ballot, with each receiving 17 votes. MPs Ahmed, Hashi and Guled in turn received 16, 9 and 6 of the total votes, respectively. According to MP Garaad, one vote was also spoiled. The top three vote-getters then proceeded to the second round run-off, which saw MPs Shire and Hersi again tie at 23 votes and MP Ahmed place third at 20 votes. MP Shire, who since 2010 served as the Puntland Minister of Livestock and Animal Husbandry, and MP Hersi, the former regional Parliament Speaker between 2008 and 2013, thereafter moved on to the third and final round of voting. Speaking on behalf of the Election Committee, MP Garaad announced that MP Shire had received 40 third round votes whereas the runner-up MP Hersi had won 26 votes, thereby making Shire the new Speaker of the House. In his acceptance speech, Shire thanked the MPs who had voted for him, commended the Puntland security forces on their work, and asked the present legislators to cooperate with him as he had pledged to do with them had he lost. The other contenders for the Speaker position in turn acknowledged the election result and congratulated Shire on his victory.

During the session, the parliamentarians also elected MP Abdihamid Sheikh Abdisalam of the Bari region and MP Haji Hussein Dirie of the Sool region as Puntland's new First Deputy Speaker and Second Deputy Speaker, respectively. Abdisalam was new to his position, while Dirie was re-elected to a post that he had held since 2008.

On 5 January 2014, Federal Government of Somalia Prime Minister Abdiweli Sheikh Ahmed's media office issued an official statement congratulating Puntland's new Speaker and Deputy Speakers on their election. The Premier also indicated that he had been closely following the local election process, asserting that its denouement was a symbol of the maturity within the Puntland political system and that the region was serving as a model to follow in Somalia's ongoing federalization. At a Federal Parliament session the same day attended by over 160 MPs, Federal Speaker of Parliament Mohamed Osman Jawari also commended the Puntland legislators on behalf of the federal MPs for having conducted a transparent, free and fair speakership ballot. Additionally, President of Somalia Hassan Sheikh Mohamud's media office issued an official statement on 7 January welcoming the Puntland presidential and parliamentary elections as great progress for Somalia at large. Mohamud felicitated the Speaker and his deputies on their election victories, and commended the Puntland Electoral Commission, Parliament and authorities for having responsibly managed the electoral process and adhered to the ballot timetable. He also noted the important role played by the traditional elders in choosing the legislators, and paid tribute to the security forces for maintaining law and order. Additionally, Mohamud thanked the presidential contenders for having peacefully campaigned, reminded them of their responsibilities as prospective office-holders, and urged them to recognize the election result and support the incoming administration.

==== President and vice president election ====
On 5 January 2014, the Puntland parliamentary election committee announced the pre-requisites for office that every prospective candidate for president and vice president must meet. According to the committee chairman MP Saadiq Abshir Garaad, under Article 78 of the Puntland Constitution, presidential contenders are required to be a native of Puntland, a practicing Muslim, mentally sane, older than 40 years of age, not married to a foreigner, in possession of the necessary educational, leadership and experience credentials to hold office, and to have resided in Puntland over the past two years. As per regulation, presidential and vice presidential candidates must also pay registration fees of US$10,000.00 and $5,000.00, respectively, to the election committee. According to government officials, the registration fees are managed by the five-member election committee, and the proceeds raised during the previous 2009 election were allocated toward the construction of the new regional parliament hall. Additionally, all contenders are required to sign a document stipulating that they would accept the outcome of the election, as well as recognize and work with Puntland's newly elected leadership. Any candidate who refuses to sign the document would be denied entry into parliament hall on election day.

On 6 January 2014, the Puntland election committee announced the official list of candidates vying for the offices of President and Vice President of Puntland. According to the committee chairman Saadiq Abshir Garaad, 11 contenders were competing for the position of President, while 10 candidates were vying for vice president. Each of the 20 candidates had met the mandatory pre-requisites for holding office, as outlined in the Puntland Constitution. The incumbent Puntland President Abdirahman Mohamed Farole and former Prime Minister of Somalia Abdiweli Gaas were both among the final list of presidential candidates, with the incumbent Puntland Vice President Abdisamad Ali Shire and former Puntland Aviation minister Ahmed Elmi Osman (Karaash) contending for the vice presidential post.

On 7 January 2014, 20 presidential and vice presidential contenders began to give their concluding speeches at the Garowe parliament hall ahead of the 8 January election. The event was again televised live on Somali Channel TV, and was attended by the new Speaker of Parliament and Deputy Speakers, as well as titled elders, Islamic clerics, police and army chiefs, media representatives, and other members of civil society. Chairman Sadiq Abshir Garaad of the election committee officially opened the session, noting that all the candidates had satisfied the panel's pre-requisites. The election committee then set a presentation limit of 15 minutes per contender during which the candidates detailed their political programs, explaining why they believed their respective platform was better suited for the region than that of the incumbent administration.

Security in the administrative capital was concurrently tightened, with the city's entry points closed since 2 January and motor traffic on the main roads restricted to emergency vehicles and security forces. The election security forces were outfitted in special military uniforms provided by UNSOM through the Puntland security committee, which differed from those of the region's other police. Additional Puntland troops were deployed throughout Garowe, including special security forces to patrol the streets and conduct searches in residential areas and along the city's main arteries. Undercover police and intelligence officials were also carrying out hotel searches during nighttime patrols, and hotel managers were instructed to monitor the movements of hotel guests and report any suspicious activity to the authorities. In addition, security on the perimeter of government buildings was strengthened, with more security forces sent to guard the candidates' residences.

Voting for the new Puntland President and Vice President began on 8 January at 9.00 am local time. Candidates that earned two-thirds of the MPs' votes would win their respective election. In the event that there is no victor in the first round, the top three contenders would face off in a second round, wherein they would need to secure 45 votes to be elected. If again no winner is established, a third and final run-off would be held between the top two candidates, who would then only require a simple majority to win. The first round of voting saw 8 of the 11 presidential contenders eliminated from the running. Incumbent Puntland President Abdirahman Farole, former Prime Minister of Somalia Abdiweli Mohamed Ali and entrepreneur Ali Haji Warsame subsequently moved on to the second round, where Farole received 31 votes versus 18 for Ali and 16 for Warsame. Farole and Ali then faced off in the third round, a final run-off in which Farole again initially led at 31 votes compared to 18 for Ali. However, a late rally by Ali saw him eventually win the election, narrowly defeating Farole by 33 votes to 32. The victory officially makes Abdiweli Mohamed Ali the 5th President of Puntland.

Concurrently, parliament elected Abdihakim Abdullahi Haji Omar as Puntland's new vice president in place of the incumbent Abdisamad Ali Shire.

In his acceptance speech, Ali expressed gratitude for the opportunity as well as the work of the Farole administration. He also pledged to defend and adhere to the Puntland Constitution, and called for collaboration in the development and security sectors. For his part, Farole indicated that he accepted the outcome of the election, and felicitated Ali on his victory. Farole also reminded Ali of the responsibility now bestowed upon him as leader, urging the new President-elect to prioritize Puntland's interests and calling on all government officials, workers and security forces to cooperate with the region's new leadership.

== Parties ==
On 14 November 2012, President Farole announced the launching of his new political party, Horseed. The association counts over 200 members and represents the incumbent Puntland government, including Vice President Abdisamad Ali Shire and the state Ministers. It is the first prospective party to register for an application with the Transitional Puntland Electoral Commission (TPEC). According to Farole, the general public will be eligible for membership in the organization once it is selected as an official political party.

On 4 December 2012, a second political party was established in Bosaso, the commercial capital of Puntland. Named the Union of the People of the Regions or UPR (Ururka Gobolada Umadaha Bahoobey or UGUB), it is led by the former Governor of Sanaag, Mohamed Saeed Nuur Dabeyl. The establishment of a third party, the Development and Justice Party or DJP (Xisbiga Horumarinta iyo Cadaalada or Horcad), and a fourth party, Midnimo, were concurrently announced in Bosaso. They are led by Puntland businessman & entrepreneur Omar Ismail Waberi and Dr. Sadiq Enow, respectively. Two additional political associations were declared later in the month in Garowe: Talowadaag (Consensus-building), chaired by Dr. Ali Ismail Mohamed, and Gahayr or Golaha Aqoonta iyo Horumarinta ee Asaaska Yoolka Runta (Council of Education and Development towards Founding the True Goal), led by Abdirizak Ismail Hassan Darwish.

== Candidates ==
As of 11 December 2013, over 15 presidential candidates were competing to be elected the next President of Puntland. A few of the contenders later pulled out of the race in early January as the election day neared. According to the election committee, the final 6 January list of candidates included 11 presidential and 10 vice presidential contenders.

=== President ===
Final

The final presidential candidates included:

- Abdirahman Farole, incumbent President of Puntland: Farole ran for re-election as President of the autonomous Puntland state through his newly established Horseed political party.
- Abdiweli Gaas, former Prime Minister of Somalia: In August 2013, Ali launched a campaign to run for president in Puntland's 2014 elections. After meeting with Puntland leaders in the UAE, opposition groups agreed that he would make a viable compromise candidate. He arrived in Puntland to confer with political and clan leaders in Galkayo and Qardho so as to strengthen ties with the opposition and secure new supporters.
- Ali Abdi Aware, former Puntland State Minister of the Presidency for International relations and Social Affairs: Aware has held various positions in the Puntland government. He previously ran for president in the region's 2008 elections.
- Ali Haji Warsame, entrepreneur: Warsame is a successful businessperson from Puntland state. He previously served as the chief executive officer of Golis Telecom Somalia, the largest telecommunications firm in northeastern Somalia. He received the endorsement of former Puntland Interim Vice President Mohamed Ali Yusuf "Gaagaabe", who dropped out of the race on 2 January 2014.
- Shire Haji Farah, entrepreneur: Farah is a successful businessperson from Puntland state. He is an Executive Committee Member of the Somali Business Council based in the UAE.

Former

The presidential candidates formerly included:

- Haji Mohamed Yasin Ismail, entrepreneur: Ismail is a successful businessperson from Puntland state. He previously ran for office in the 2012 Somalia presidential elections. He officially pulled out of the Puntland presidential race on 3 January 2014.

=== Vice president ===
- Abdihakim Abdullahi Haji Omar, professional: Haji is a political newcomer originally from Buuhoodle in the northern Cayn region of Somalia.
- Abdisamad Ali Shire, incumbent Vice President of Puntland: Shire ran for re-election as Vice President of the autonomous Puntland state through the newly established Horseed political party.
- Ahmed Elmi Osman (Karaash), former Minister of Aviation of Puntland: Karaash was previously a minister in the early Farole administration. He later briefly served as a president in the Khatumo State polity.

== Results ==
Candidate	Party	First round		Second round		Third round	
Candidate	Party	Votes	%	Votes	%	Votes	%
Abdirahman Mohamud Farole	Horseed	27	40.91	31	47.69	32	49.23
Abdiweli Mohamed Ali	Ururka Dadka Puntland	13	19.70	18	27.69	33	50.77
Ali Haji Warsame	Independent	12	18.18	16	24.62	0	0.00
Mohamed Abdi Nuur	Independent	6	9.09				
Shire Haji Farah	Ururka Dadka Puntland	4	6.06				
Ali Abdi Aware	Independent	3	4.55				
Abdullahi Sa'id Samater	Independent	1	1.52				
Abdi Yusuf Yey	Independent	0	0.00				
Abdiweli Ma'alin Gurey	Independent	0	0.00				
Ali Abdulkadir Yusuf	Independent	0	0.00				
Mohamud Abdirahman Uke	Independent	0	0.00				
Total		66	100.00	65	100.00	65	100.00
Source: Horseed Media

=== Reactions ===
Shortly after the announcement of the election result, President of Somalia Hassan Sheikh Mohamud congratulated Gaas on his win, indicating that he looked forward to working together. Mohamud described Puntland as a democratic model for the rest of the country, and thanked the outgoing regional President Farole for accepting the ballot outcome with grace and for his leadership in Puntland over the past half-decade. Prime Minister Abdiweli Sheikh Ahmed in turn felicitated Gaas on his victory. Describing the moment as a great day for Somalia, Ahmed commended the Puntland authorities for ensuring that the elections were peaceful, free and fair. He also thanked President Farole for his service to Puntland.

UN Special Representative for Somalia Nicholas Kay likewise congratulated Gaas on his win. Noting that Puntland was spearheading Somalia's ongoing federalization, Kay hailed the region's MPs, Speaker and traditional leaders for their respective roles in the election process. He also commended former Puntland President Farole for the latter's constructive role and peaceful transfer of power. Additionally, the European Union Special Envoy to Somalia Michele Cervone d'Urso described the vote as a positive development for Somalia's democratisation process and urged national reconciliation. The US Special Representative for Somalia James P. McAnulty in turn issued a statement welcoming Gaas's election as Puntland President, and saluting Puntland residents for having conducted the ballot in a democratic manner. McAnulty also paid tribute to Farole for his many achievements during his tenure, including his emphasis on security and his key role in the Roadmap federal transition process.

== See also ==
- 2009 Puntland presidential election
- 2019 Puntland presidential election
