= 2009 Puntland presidential election =

← 2005	8 January 2009	2014 →

66 MPs of the House of Representatives 45 votes needed to win
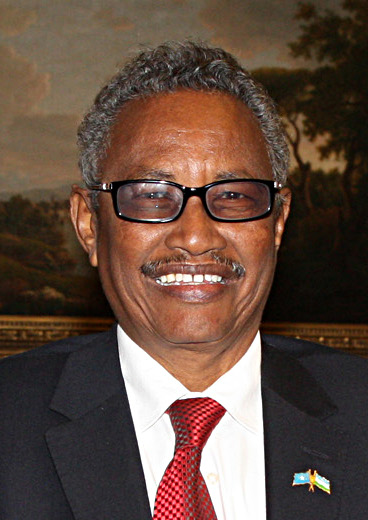

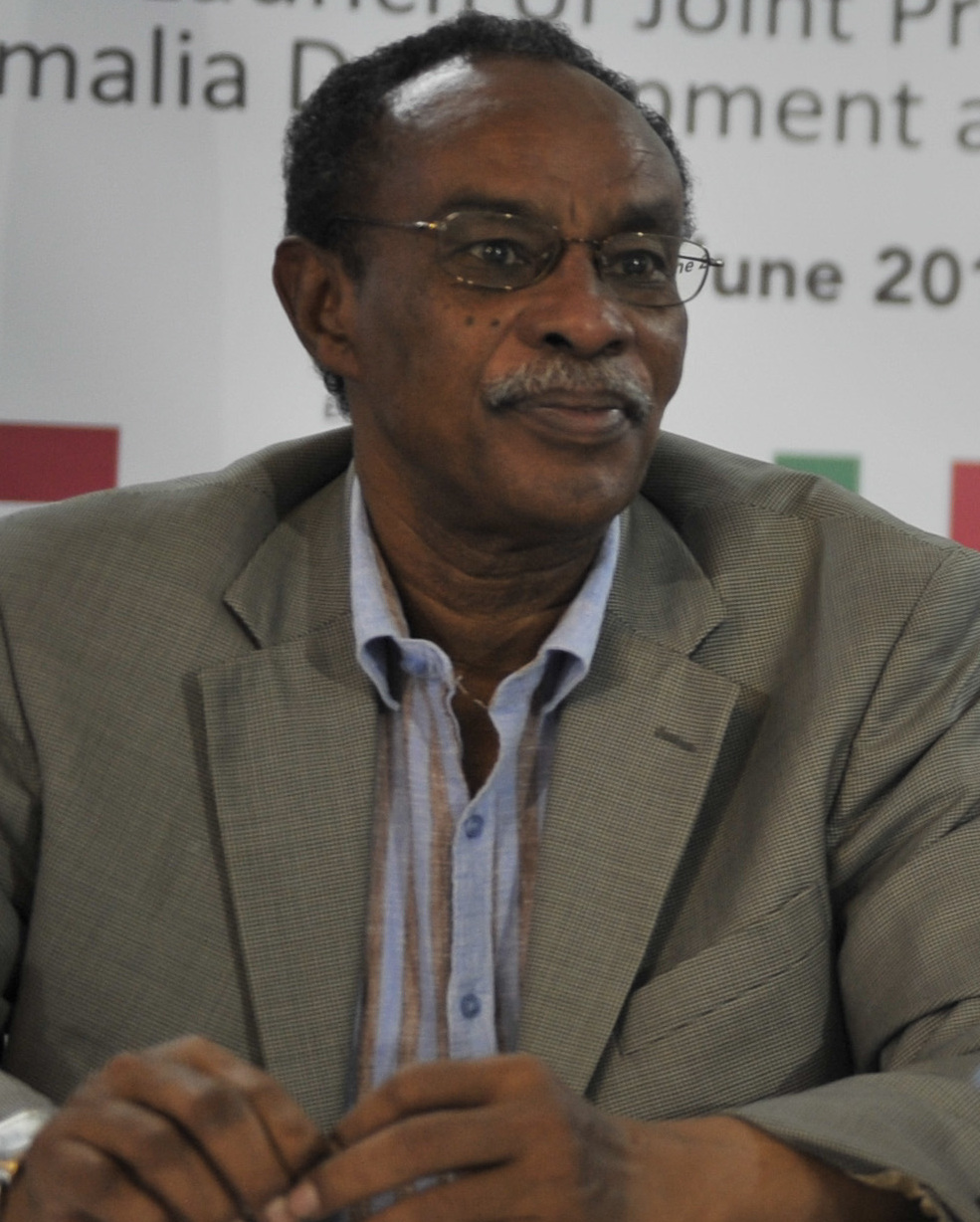
Candidate	Abdirahman Farole	Abdullahi Ahmed Jama
Party	Horseed	Independent
Electoral vote	49	17
President before election
Adde Muse
Elected President
Abdirahman Farole

The 2009 Puntland presidential election was held on 8 January 2009 in Garowe, the administrative capital of the autonomous Puntland state of Somalia. The second such vote to be held in the state since its establishment 1998, it followed the election of a new Parliament Speaker and Deputy Speakers on January 04, 2009 by the 66-seat bicameral legislature. Candidates included officials from the incumbent Puntland administration, former government ministers and prominent local entrepreneurs. The ballot saw the election of former Puntland minister of finance Abdirahman Farole as the fourth president of Puntland, majority defeating Abdullahi Ahmed Jama. Parliament of Puntland concurrently elected Abdisamad Ali Shire as Puntland's new vice president in place of Hassan Dahir Afqurac.

== Background ==
In January 2009 the semi-autonomous state of Puntland in Somalia witnessed a pivotal presidential election. The newly elected President, Abdirahman Mohamed Farole, assumed office amidst significant challenges, pledging to address piracy, corruption, and restore security.

== Campaigns ==
President Farole, a reformist figure, campaigned on promises of eliminating piracy, tackling corruption, and prioritizing security. The incumbent, President Adde Muse, faced accusations of financial mismanagement, corruption, and a deteriorating security situation. Farole's victory, securing 49 out of 66 votes, reflected widespread discontent with Muse's administration.

Ahmed Saeed O'Nur, a presidential candidate, highlighted accusations of corruption against Muse, urging parliament not to re-elect him. The campaign period saw heightened political tension, but the election itself unfolded peacefully, credited to mediation by clan elders.

== Results ==
In the presidential elections, conducted by members of the House of Representatives, a total of 66 valid votes were cast in each round. There were no abstentions or invalid votes throughout the process.

Abdirahman Farole emerged as the victor, securing increasing support in each round. In the first round, he garnered 25 votes, representing 37.88% of the total. His support continued to grow in subsequent rounds, reaching 33 votes (50.00%) in the second round and ultimately 49 votes (74.24%) in the third round.

His closest competitor, Abdullahi Ahmed Jama "Ilkajir" initially received 14 votes (21.21%) in the first round. However, his support dwindled slightly in the following rounds, with 18 votes (27.27%) in the second round and 17 votes (25.76%) in the third round.

Other candidates, including Nuradin Adan Diriye, Mohamud Muse Hersi "Adde" Adan Mohamed Gadale, Said Mohamed Rage, Ali Abdi Aware, and Omar Ali Farjac, either maintained or lost their support throughout the rounds, with some dropping out of the race after the first or second round.

Abdisamad Ali Shire was elected vice-president.

Faroole, Puntland's third president, is a former banker and Puntland finance minister. He is a member of the Isse Mohamoud sub-clan of the dominant Majeerteen clan and hails from Garowe. Gen Shire originates from Taleh, Ugaadhyahan sub-clan of Dhulbahante.

Candidate	Party	First round		Second round		Third round	
Candidate	Party	Votes	%	Votes	%	Votes	%
Abdirahman Farole	Horseed	25	37.88	33	50.00	49	74.24
Abdullahi Ahmed Jama	Independent	14	21.21	18	27.27	17	25.76
Nuradin Adan Diriye	Independent	8	12.12	11	16.67		
Mohamud Muse Hersi	Independent	8	12.12	4	6.06		
Adan Mohamed Gadale	Independent	4	6.06				
Said Mohamed Rage	Independent	4	6.06				
Ali Abdi Aware	Independent	3	4.55				
Omar Ali Farjac	Independent	0	0.00				
Total		66	100.00	66	100.00	66	100.00
Source: African Elections Database

== Reactions ==
The international community, represented by U.S.-based observer Michael Weinstein, acknowledged the success of the election as a potential model for Somalia. The role of clan elders in ensuring a smooth transition was highlighted, emphasizing the capacity for Somalis to unite for a common cause.

President Farole's subsequent demand for the withdrawal of Somaliland forces from Sool region strained relations. The Somaliland Foreign Minister expressed discontent, indicating potential challenges to regional peace.

In light of Farole's reformist stance, expectations were high for concrete steps toward fulfilling campaign promises, particularly in addressing poverty, promoting economic development, and renegotiating controversial agreements, such as the mineral and oil rights deal signed in 2006.

The overall sentiment was that a responsible and stable government in Puntland under Farole's leadership could contribute significantly to the broader stability of Somalia. The need for an honest leader to navigate these complexities and foster unity remained crucial for the region's future.
