= Ali Abdi Aware =

Somali politician

- Cali Cabdi Awaare علي عبدي أواري
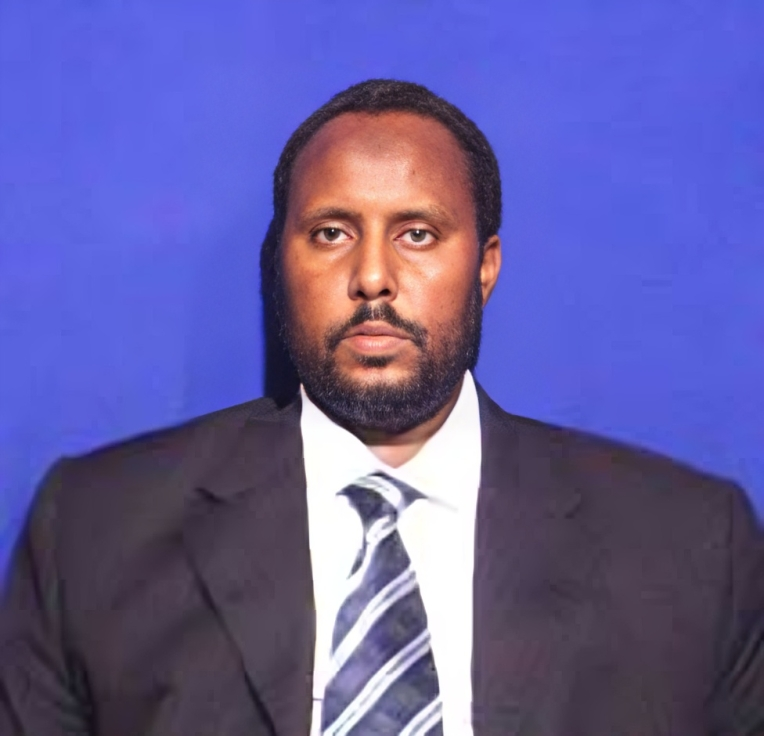

Ambassador of The Federal Republic Of Somalia to Egypt and Representative of Somalia for the Arab League
- Incumbent
- Assumed office since June 4th 2024 to now

Puntland Presidency minister of state for International Relations and Social Affairs
- In office 2005–2008

Federal Republic of Somalia Representative to The Arab League

Personal details
- Born: 15 May 1957 (age 69) Beyla, Bari, Somalia

Ali Abdi Aware (Somali: Cali Cabdi Awaare, Arabic: علي عبدي أواري; born 15 May 1957 in Bayla, Bari, Somalia) is a Somali politician and a diplomat he is the Ambassador of Somalia to Egypt and Representative of Somalia for Arab league. A former state minister of the Puntland Presidency for International Relations and Social Affairs, he has also been a candidate for the Puntland presidential elections in 2009, 2014, and 2019.

== Biography ==
Awaare has over the years held various positions in the government of Puntland, including State Minister of the Presidency for International Relations and Social Affairs. In 2008, he ran for president in that year's Puntland elections. He was eliminated in the first round of voting, receiving 4.55% of votes.

In 2013, Aware presented himself as a candidate in the 2014 Puntland presidential election, which took place on 8 January 2014 in Garowe. He was eliminated in the first round of voting, with former Prime Minister of Somalia Abdiweli Mohamed Ali declared the winner.

== See also ==
- Ali Haji Warsame
- Ibrahim Artan Ismail
- Shire Haji Farah
