= Mohamed Isse Lacle =

Somali politician and engineer

Eng Mohamed Isse Ali محمد عيسى علي
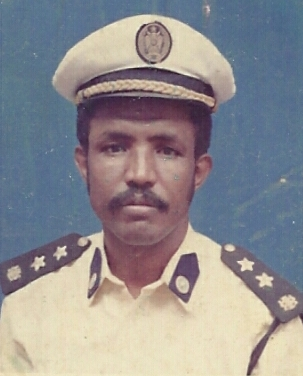

Deputy Minister of Ministry of Maritime Transport and Fishery Puntland
- In office 2004–2005

Deputy Minister of Ministry of Marine Transport, Ports and Counter Piracy Puntland
- In office 2009–2014

Personal details
- Born: 7 July 1956 Las Anod, British Somaliland (now Somalia)
- Party: XHKS (c. 1975–1991)
- Education: (Somalia) Somali National University (Soviet Union) Military Engineering-Technical University (United States) Naval War College
- Awards: Navy Forces Officer Medal
- Nickname: Col. Lacle (Ganaje)

Military service
- Allegiance: Somali National Army
- Branch/service: Somali Navy Puntland Maritime Police Force
- Years of service: 1975-1991; 2020-Present
- Rank: Colonel
- Battles/wars: Exercise Bright Star Anti-piracy measures in Somalia; Islamic State insurgency in Puntland

Eng. Mohamed Isse Ali (Somali: Maxamed Ciise Cali, Arabic: محمد عيسى علي) (born in 1956), also known as Col. Mohamed Isse Ganaje, is a Somali engineer, Navy commander, and politician. Lacle has extensive experience in naval warfare, electricity and mechanics, politics and diplomacy. He has taught subjects in naval warfare and engineering in the Technical Maritime Intermediate School of the National Somali Navy and served as director from 1981 to 1982. He served in the Somali Navy from 1975 to 1991 and held several commanding positions at his time before the Somali Civil War broke. He holds the rank of naval captain. He currently resides in Garoe, the capital of Puntland.

== Personal life ==
Lacle was born in 1956 in Las Anod, Somalia. He attended Las Anod Intermediate School and Sheikh Secondary School in Sheikh, situated in the northwestern Togdheer province of present-day Somalia. He studied in Somali National University and graduated with honors, with a Bachelor of Science in Engineering. Lacle received a scholarship to attend Military Engineering-Technical University, at that time known as Leningrad Naval Engineering Academy in Leningrad, and he graduated with honors, with a Master of Science degree in electromechanics. Lacle attended the Coast Guard Academy and later Naval War College on Faculty Command in the United States and wrote his dissertation about Soviet Somali policy. Lacle later wrote and defended his dissertation to fulfill the requirements for Masters in Strategy, National Security and Decision Making. He also attended several Naval Institutes in the United States for number of courses Master Diesel Course at National Training Center Great Lakes, Engineering Officer of the Watch at Surface Warfare Officers School and Defense Language Institute in United States.

== Career ==
=== Somali Navy ===
From 1982 to 1983 Eng. Lacle worked at the Technical Maritime Intermediate School of National Somali Navy as he was the general director of the school as well as a lecturer. Follows the command position in Somali Navy Berbera Navy Base from 1982 to 1983 as he was assigned there as Health, Safety, and Environmental Protection Officer. In 1987 Lacle was assigned the Head of Engineering Department of the Somali Navy Mogadishu Headquarters and he was active in that position until 1991 when the Somali Civil War broke.

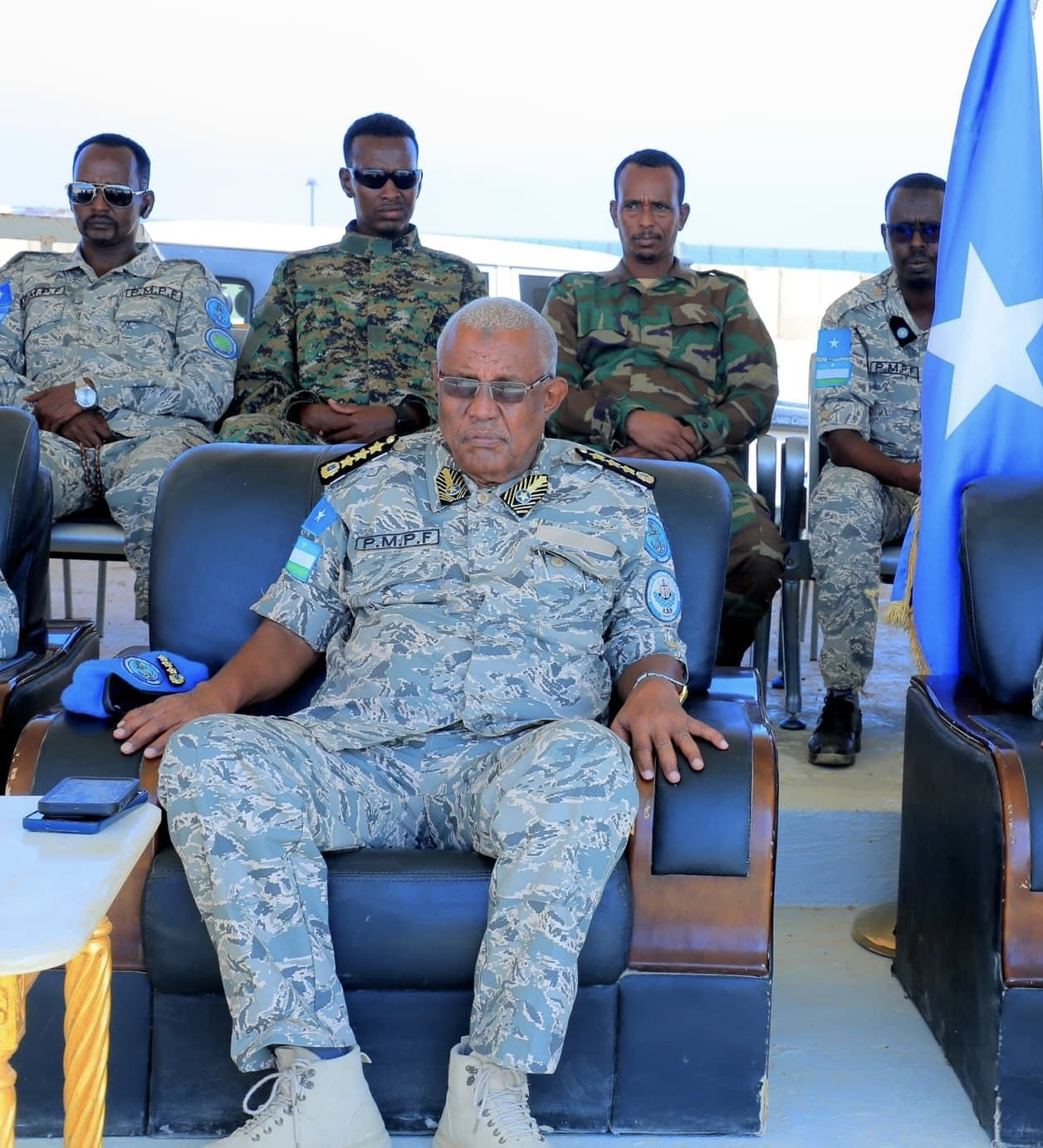
Ganaje in attendance of a training commencement of new batch of PMPF recruits.

Col. Lacle was recalled to join the newly formed and effective anti-piracy maritime force the Puntland Maritime Police Force, as he was one of the few officers with extensive experience and knowledge in Naval Operations, and Logistics in the Somali Navy. Lacle was promoted for his efforts to reform and educate the Puntland Maritime Police Force.

=== Mutuwa Marine Works ===
Eng. Lacle started working in 1992 at a United Arab Emirates company as a chief engineer in Mutawa Marine Works.

=== Puntland ===
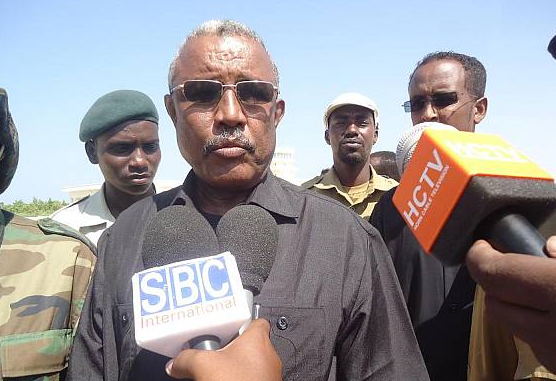
Deputy Minister of Ministry of Ports, Maritime Transport and Counter Piracy Eng. Mohamed Isse Lacle

From 2004 to 2005 Eng. Lacle was appointed by the president, Mohamud Muse Hersi, as the deputy minister of Ministry of Maritime Transport and Fishery and be unassigned after changes being made by the president. In 2009 after Abdirahman Mohamud Farole was elected as the new president of Puntland State he was assigned as the deputy minister of Ministry of Marine Transport, Ports and Counter Piracy and remained in his position until the term of presidency ended for Mr. Abdirahman Mohamud Farole in 2014, and he is one of the most senior members of the Horseed (political party) of the President of the Political Party and the State of Puntland Mr. Abdirahman Mohamud Farole. Eng. Lacle was playing an important role in both counter piracy and Maritime in Puntland, as he was the Puntland official that participated in international conferences against Piracy in Somalia in Seychelles the Maritime Security and Anti Piracy Workshop which he was the representative in the workshop for Puntland and one of the naval command officers, also Eng. Lacle participated in number of developments taken by the Ministry in his time there from the development of the Port of Bosaso and developing technical schools for the local community.

== See also ==
- Puntland
- Mohamed Hashi
- Abdirahman Mohamud Farole
- Said Mohamed Rage
- Abdiweli Mohamed Ali
- Las Anod
