= Ururka Dadka Puntland =

Political Party in Somalia

- Abbreviation: UDAD
- Leader: Abdiweli Gaas
- Chairperson: Said Farah Mohamed
- General Secretary: Shire Haji Farah
- Founded: June 2013
- Headquarters: Garowe, Puntland

Website
- http://udadpuntland.com/

Ururka Dadka Puntland (UDAD, lit. 'Puntland People's Party') is an opposition Puntland political party.

On 28 June 2013, together with a number of other parties, UDAD organized a rally in Bosaso. It is part of a broader campaign by political parties ahead of the Puntland Local Council elections. Demonstrators drove cars and carried billboards with slogans in support of UDAD. Association leaders, officials and the public marched through the main streets of Bossaso, then gathered at the football stadium, where speeches were made by party figures as well as supporters of the association.

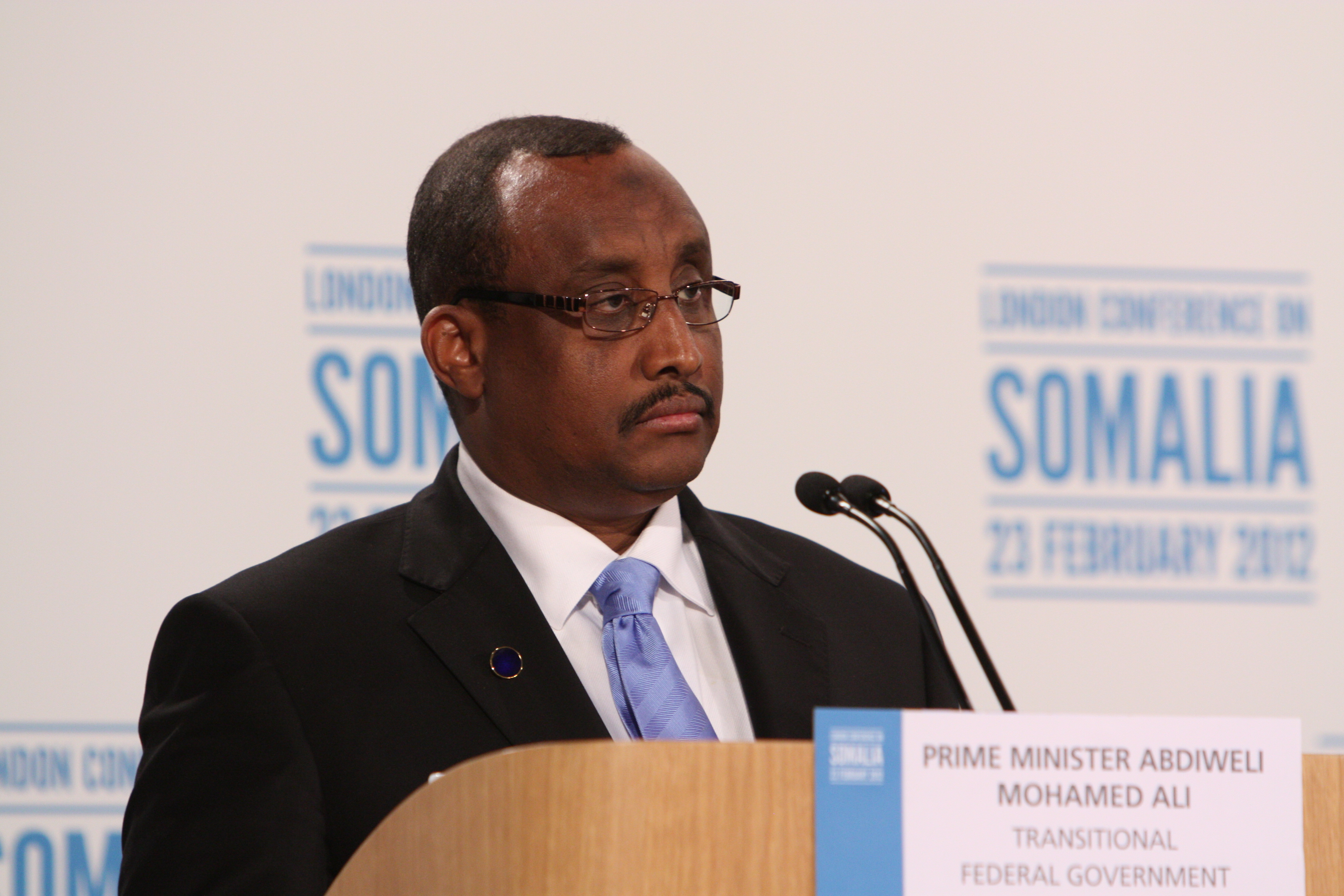
Abdiweli Gaas, President of Puntland (2014—2019)

On 8 January 2014, Abdiweli Mohamed Ali, an economist who was educated in the United States, was elected as the new President of Puntland by a margin of just one vote: 33 deputies voted for him, and 32 deputies voted for the second candidate, Abdirahman Farole, the leader and founder of the Horseed party. Farole, who was president for 5 years, conceded defeat, saying the election was "civil" and peaceful and became a model for the rest of Somalia. Then he congratulated the opponent on the victory. "Puntland has shown the rest of Somalia and the world that the democratic culture is alive and well here, and this is what we should be guided by in the process of rebuilding our country," he added.

On 23 August 2014, the Chairman of the Party Said Farah Sanwayne held a press conference in Garowe. He criticized the government of Abdiweli Gaas for not fulfilling the promised democratic process. Soon this year, an Election Commission was formed to monitor the process. The party was one of the founding members of the party elections of the administration of President Abdirahman Farole (he later decided to cancel them because the ballot boxes were destroyed). "My main criticisms of the current government are democracy and the fight against corruption. From the point of view of good governance, constitutional issues, the Puntland federalism and economic issues," — said Sanwayne. He also said that the Gaas government failed to implement the party system in time. "The manifestation of federalism and democracy is, of course, good, but democracy itself, including the Ministry, is controversial... We expected that local councils, district commissioners and villages would be directly elected, but this hasn't yet been implemented." Other issues discussed by Saeed Farah include economic issues such as taxation and so on.

== See also ==
- Political parties in Somalia
