= Shire (name) =

- Gender: Male
- Language: Somali

Shire (Somali: Shire) is a traditional Somali name.

== Given name ==
- Shire Haji Farah, the current Minister of Finance of the Puntland region of Somalia.
- Shire Jama Ahmed, was a Somali linguist who is credited with having devised a unique Latin script for transcribing the Somali language.

== Surname ==
- Abdisamad Ali Shire, former vice-president of the Puntland region of Somalia.
- Barre Adan Shire Hiiraale, former Minister of Defense of Somalia.
- Hussein Shire, a Somali entrepreneur.
- Mohamoud Ali Shire, the 26th Sultan of the Warsangali Sultanate, reigning from 1897 to 1960.
- Said Hassan Shire, current Speaker of the Puntland regional parliament.
- Warsan Shire, British-Somali poet.
- Abdi Shire Warsame, former Somali ambassador to Iran and Kenya.
- Ali Shire Warsame, former Somali politician and businessmen.
- Warsame Shire Awale, a prominent Somali poet, playwright and songwriter.
