= Ministry of Finance (Puntland) =

Government Ministry in Puntland

- Wasaaradda Maaliyadda ee Dawladda Puntland وزارة المالية في بونتلاند

Agency overview
- Formed: 23 August 1998
- Jurisdiction: Government of Puntland
- Headquarters: Garowe Puntland
- Minister responsible: Mohamed Farah Mohamoud
- Website: https://mof.pl.so/ministry/

The Ministry of Finance of the Government of the Puntland MoFGoP (Somali: Wasaaradda Maaliyadda ee Dawladda Puntland; Arabic: وزارة المالية في بونتلاند) is the government body responsible for regulating the fiscal affairs of the Government of Puntland, including managing, controlling and monitoring public revenues and expenditures. The first minister was Said Mohamed Mohamoud 'Adur' and current minister is Mohamed Farah Mohamoud.

== Establishment ==
The Puntland Ministry of Finance was established on 23 August 1998, as one of the first Ten Ministries following the establishment of the Puntland government.

The Ministry is to regulate the Public and Private Financial Management of the Government and to ensure the functional fluency of the state's official currency. The Ministry also prepares the Government’s economic and financial policy, as well as the Budget, and acts as a tax policy expert.

The Ministry also collects and manages revenue; budget planning, preparation and management. The formulation and promotion of national fiscal and economic policy; trade facilitation and border control; debt management, and the management of the State Enterprises Sector.

== List of ministers ==
- Said Mohamed Mohamoud Adur
- Abdirahman Farole
- Mohamed Ali Yusuf
- Farah Ali Jama
- Shire Haji Farah
- Abdullahi Said Aarshe
- Hassan Shire Abgaal
- Mohamed Abdirahman Dhabancad
- Mohamed Farah Mohamoud
