= Shyer =

Shyer is a surname. Notable people with the name include:

- Charles Shyer (1941–2024), American film director, screenwriter and producer
- Christopher Shyer, Canadian actor
- Hallie Meyers-Shyer (born 1987), American film actress, director and writer
- Melville Shyer (1895–1968), American film director, screenwriter and producer

== See also ==
- Shire (disambiguation)
- Shy (disambiguation)
- Shier, a surname
