= Ali Haji Warsame =

Puntland politician

- علي حاج ورسمه
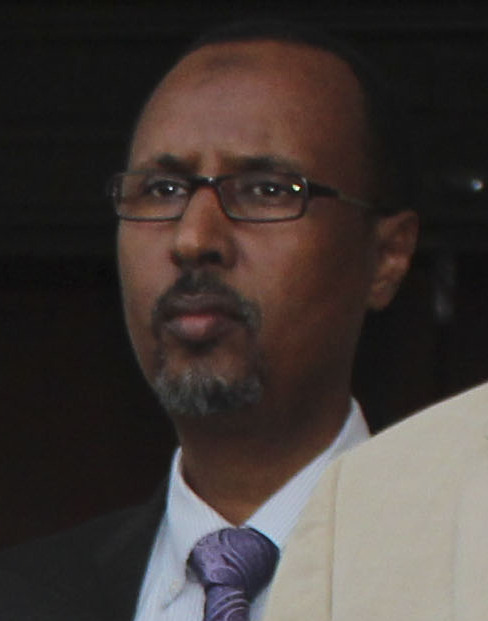
- Ali Haji Warsame in 2014

Puntland Minister of Education and Higher Education
- In office 28 January 2014 – 16 June 2015
- President: Abdiweli Mohamed Ali
- Vice President: Abdihakim Abdullahi Haji Omar
- Preceded by: Abdi Farah
- Succeeded by: Abshir Yusuf Isse

Chief Executive Director of (Golis Telecommunication Company)

Director of Management (Port of Bosaso)
- In office 1993–1996

Personal details
- Born: 1964 (age 61–62) Seemade, Mudug, Somalia
- Education: Somali Institute for Development, Administration and Management; American University in London
- Awards: Most influential people in Somalia, 100 creative people of Puntland

Ali Haji Warsame (Somali: Cali Xaaji Warsame, Arabic: علي حاج ورسمه; born 1964) is a Puntland entrepreneur, accountant, and politician. He served as the first director of management at the Port of Bosaso, and later as the chief executive officer of Golis Telecom Somalia. In 2014, he was appointed the Puntland Minister of Higher Education.

== Personal life ==
Warsame was born in 1964 in Seemada, a village near the Jariban District in the Mudug province of the autonomous Puntland state in northeastern Somalia. His late father was a lawyer, judge, politician, intellectual, and community and religious leader who was part of the local independence movement in the 1940s and 1950s. His mother hails from the northern Sool province.

Warsame belongs to the Omar Mahmoud subclan of Majeerteen Harti Darod clan.

He began school in the northwestern town of Hargeisa, the second largest city in Somalia. Warsame completed his primary education in the Mudug province capital of Galkayo. He subsequently studied at the Somali Institute for Development, Administration and Management (SIDAM), earning a bachelor's degree in business management and administration in 1990. In 2003, he received an MBA in management information systems from the American University in London.

Besides Somalia, Warsame has lived and worked in various countries, including the United Arab Emirates and the United Kingdom. He is also fluent in a number of languages, notably Somali, Arabic and English.

== Career ==
=== Philanthropy ===
Besides business and politics, Warsame is also involved in a number of philanthropic endeavours. He is a contributor to various charity organizations in Somalia and elsewhere. He also provides basic training services to youth and adult learners in the Puntland region. Additionally, Warsame is a trustee of the UK-based MURDA charity, which offers training and educational programs overseas.

=== Professional memberships ===
Warsame is a member of a number of professional organizations:

- Certified Public Accountant (CPA)
- Member of the Somali Association of Certified Accountants
- Member of American Institute of Certified Public Accountants and Licensed Auditor from Delaware State Board of Accountancy
- Certified Accounting Technician
- Assessor from City & Guilds, UK.

== Puntland ==
=== Early career ===
Warsame is an entrepreneur with experience in auditing, accounting, and public financial management.

He started his career as a Financial and Administrative Controller for Man and Brothers, a private firm in the water facility installation industry. When the civil war broke out in Somalia in 1991, Warsame relocated to the northern regions of Puntland where he spent more years.

Warsame later moved to the United Arab Emirates. He held managerial positions in various local institutions. Between June 1991 to March 2012, he was a Senior Consultant/Partner at Falcon Associates Limited. He also served as an Auditor/Senior-in-charge at the Abu Dhabi Accountability Authority, as a Financial Controller at the UAE Ministry of Education-affiliated Abu Dhabi Educational Zone, and as a Senior Auditor at Al-Radhwan Accounting and Auditing. Warsame likewise acted as a Senior Accountant at the Pistache Trading Co. LLC.

From 2001 and 2003, Warsame began lecturing at a number of educational institutions in the United Arab Emirates. He taught accounting, business law, reporting, financial accounting and auditing at the Abu Dhabi Audit Authority. He also served as an instructor on accounting and accounting software applications at the Somali Cultural Foundation and Hatta Computers Company in Dubai.

In 2012, Warsame returned to Somalia, becoming the chief executive officer of Golis Telecom. Among the largest telecommunications companies in the country, it had 41 branches and 141 centers across the Puntland, Somaliland and Galmudug regions in 2013. Warsame worked at the firm from May 2012 to October 2013, and was responsible for overseeing managerial and financial activities, formulating administrative policies and procedures, adhering to the operational budget and financial guidelines, and liaising with all of the company's divisions, departments, sections and sub-sections.

In 2013, Warsame presented himself as a candidate in the 2014 Puntland presidential elections, which took place on 8 January 2014 in Garowe. He received the endorsement of former Puntland Interim Vice President Mohamed Ali Yusuf "Gaagaab", who dropped out of the race on 2 January 2014. The first round of voting saw 8 of the 11 presidential contenders eliminated from the running. Warsame, incumbent Puntland President Abdirahman Mohamud Farole and former Prime Minister of Somalia Abdiweli Mohamed Ali "Gaas" subsequently moved on to the second round, where Warsame was eliminated. He received 16 votes versus 18 for Ali and 31 for Farole, with Ali eventually winning the ballot.

=== Puntland Minister of education ===
On 28 January 2014, Warsame was appointed Puntland's Minister of Education by the new elected President Abdiweli Gaas. Warsame was later sacked by Puntland's president, Gaas while on visit to UK
