= Hassan Dahir Afqurac =

Vice President of Puntland from 2005 to 2009

- Xasan Daahir Maxamuud "Afqurac" حسن طاهر محمود افقرع

3rd Vice President of Puntland
- In office 8 January 2005 – 8 January 2009
- President: Mohamud Muse Hersi
- Preceding: Mohamed Abdi Hashi (also serving as interim President)
- Preceded by: Mohamed Ali Yusuf Gaagaab (also serving as interim Vice President)
- Succeeded by: Abdisamad Ali Shire

Personal details
- Born: Erigavo
- Died: January 21, 2013 Nairobi, Kenya
- Cause of death: Liver disease
- Party: Independent

Hassan Dahir Mohamoud 'Afqurac' (Somali Xasan Daahir Maxamuud Af-Qurac; d. January 21, 2013 Arabic حسن طاهر محمود افقرع) was a former Vice President of Puntland from 8 January 2005 to 8 January 2009 and was succeeded by Abdisamad Ali Shire. In 2013, he died of liver disease in Nairobi.

== Early life ==
Afqurac is a Somali, and is from the Naleye Ahmed sub-sublineage of the Mohamoud Garad branch of the Dhulbahante clan. He was born in Erigavo. Before the fall of the former Somali regime, he was a senior officer in the Somali Navy. After the founding of Puntland, he became a member of the Puntland Parliament and was the second vice-speaker of the parliament before becoming vice president.

== Vice Presidency of Puntland ==
On 8 January 2005, the Puntland presidential and vice-presidential elections were held in Garowe, and Mohamud Muse Hersi was elected president. Afqurac resigned as the second vice president of the parliament to run for the vice presidency, which he won. Since the founding of Puntland, the previous vice-president had been Mohamed Abdi Hashi, a member of the Qayaad branch of the Dhulbahante minority. On the other hand, the two major clans of the Dhulbahante are the Mohamoud Garad and the Farah Garad, and the appointment of Afqurac from the Mohamoud Garad as vice president upset the balance of power between the two clans, and the Farah Garad clan rebelled.

In November 2005, following an outbreak of measles among children in Puntland, Puntland joined forces with WHO and other organizations to launch a vaccination campaign, Vice President Afqurac stressed the importance of vaccination.

On 9 April 2007, pro-Puntland militias and Somaliland troops clashed in Dhahar, a town in the disputed area between Somaliland and Puntland, and Somaliland troops occupied Dhahar on 12 April. But on this occasion, the Somaliland troops withdrew on the order of the Somaliland Minister of Defense. Regarding this incident, Vice President Afqurac accused the residents of Mogadishu of colluding with Somaliland.

In September 2007, President Hersi dismissed the Puntland Secretary of Interior Ahmed Abdi Habsade, from the Farah Garad clan, because of his move to gain independence from Puntland. In October, Habsade turned to Somaliland and brought the Somaliland army into Las Anod, the largest city in the Dhulbahante clan region. Since then, Somaliland has consistently controlled Las Anod until now in 2021, and the surrounding cities of Las Anod are gradually being taken over by Somaliland forces. Habsade himself returned to Puntland in 2014.

In March 2008, Somaliland's President Kahin announced the creation of new regions and districts in Somaliland, including those disputed with Puntland. Vice President Afqurac dismissed this.

In April 2008, Vice President Afqurac visited Ethiopia to recuperate from his illness. While there, he also held meetings with Ethiopian officials and visited Djibouti. He returned to Puntland on 4 August.

In November 2008, Vice President Afqurac attended the inauguration ceremony of the Chief of the Darod clan in Qardho.

== Afterward ==
In January 2009, elections were held in Puntland for President and Vice President, and Abdisamad Ali Shire was elected as vice president. President Hersi and Vice President Afqurac became the first heads of state in Puntland whose terms had expired and not been extended. The term of office has been kept after the resignation of Afqurac. It was also the first time a pension was given to a former Puntland head of state.

In February 2010, Attended a 10-day SSC regional conference in Buro Wadal, Sool Region.

== Death ==
On January 21, 2013, The former vice president of Puntland, Hassan Dahir Mohamud AfQurac, died in a hospital in Nairobi, the capital of Kenya. The deceased vice president of an illness he had been suffering from for the last 6 months.

Afqurack died due to liver disease. He was a member of the Puntland House of Representatives for six years before his death.

The death of Hassan Dahir was condoled by the highest leaders of Puntland such as President Abdirahman Faroole, his vice president Gen. Abdisamed Ali Shire and the Speak of the House of Representatives Abdirashid Mohamed Hirsi.

Political offices
Preceded by Mohamed Ali Yusuf; Acting	Vice President of Puntland; 2005-2009	Succeeded by Abdisamad Ali Shire
