= Shier =

Shier is a surname. Notable people with the name include:

- Jonathan Shier (born 1947), Australian businessman and media executive
- Peter Shier (born 1955), Canadian ice hockey player
- Shelley M. Shier (born 1957), Canadian-American theatre manager and art dealer
- Stanley Gerald Umphrey Shier (1903–1968), Canadian physician

== See also ==
- Carl H. Shier Farm, a historic building in Dublin, Ohio
- Shyer (surname)
- Shires (surname)
