= Ministry of Sea Transport, Ports and Maritime Crime Prevention =

Government ministry in Puntland

- Wasaaradda Gaadiidka Badda, Dekedaha iyo Ka hortagga Danbiyada Badda وزارة النقل البحري والموانئ ومنع الجريمة البحرية

Agency overview
- Formed: 1 August 1998
- Jurisdiction: Government of Puntland
- Headquarters: Bosaso, Puntland
- Minister responsible: Shakir Mohamed Guled
- Website: https://mopmcp.pl.so/

The Puntland Ministry of Sea Transport, Ports and Maritime Crime Prevention MoPMCP (Somali: Wasaaradda Gaadiidka Badda, Dekedaha iyo Ka hortagga Danbiyada Badda) is a government body responsible for the development and regulation of maritime transport, ports and harbor Development, maritime administration, and coastal maritime crimes. The ministry also formulates, integrates policies, and implements outcomes in the Maritime sector that contribute to national competitiveness and increase the economy and quality of life in Puntland. The first holder was Mohamed Mohamoud Jeestar and current minister is Shakir Mohamed Guled.

== History ==
In 2013, Somalia federal government signed a deal with a Dutch firm, Atlantic Marine and Offshore Group, to establish a coast guard to combat piracy and secure Somalia’s economic zone. The agreement included building and operating a fleet with long-range patrol vessels and providing training. However, Puntland rejected the deal, calling it “unacceptable” and a threat to its sovereignty. Puntland’s Ministry of Sea Transport, Ports, and Maritime Crime Prevention stated that the agreement undermined regional efforts to maintain control over Somali territorial waters, asserting that Puntland fully controls its own waters.

In 2020, Puntland's Ports Minister faced intense scrutiny in the state parliament over a contested deal involving the management of Bosaso Port, a critical economic hub in semi-autonomous Puntland. The parliamentary session, held in Garowe, centered on concerns about the terms of an agreement with Dubai-based DP World, which had previously managed the port under a 2017 concession deal but faced accusations of breach of contract in 2020. Lawmakers questioned the minister on the lack of transparency and potential economic impacts on local trade, echoing earlier criticisms from 2020 when MP Abdiasis Said Ga’amay alleged DP World's management led to a decline in Bosaso's economic activity. The session highlighted ongoing tensions between Puntland's government and its parliament regarding foreign involvement in the region's strategic assets, with no clear resolution reported.

== List of ministries ==
- Mohamed Mohamoud Jeestar
- Said Mohamed Rage
- Shakir Mohamed Guled
