= Horcad =

Political party in Somalia

Horcad Political Association Urur Siyaasadeedka Horcad
- Chairperson: Omar Ismail Waberi
- Founder: Omar Ismail Waberi
- Founded: 5 December 2012
- Headquarters: Bosaso, Puntland
- Ideology: Conservatism
- Political position: Centre-right

Horseed (Somali: Urur Siyaasadeedka Horcad, lit. 'justice and development') is a political party based in Puntland, It was announced in Bosaso on 5 December 2012 and was one of the associations registered to partake municipal and presidential elections of puntland scheduled to be held in 2013

== Overview ==
Horcad was launched in Bosaso on 5 December 2012 with the aim to partake in local and presidential elections of puntland and developing political agendas useful for the stakeholders. Abdulkadir Ahmed Dualle was elected the interim chairperson and remained the post until association's convention was held in February 2013, in the election delegates elected Omar Ismail Waberi as the chairperson.

== See also ==
- Political parties in Somalia
