= Shire, Mawal =

Village in Maharashtra

Shire
- Village
- Country: India
- State: Maharashtra
- District: Pune
- Tehsil: Mawal

Government
  - Type: Panchayati Raj
  - Body: Gram panchayat

Area
  - Total: 428.39 ha (1,058.6 acres)

Population (2011)
  - Total: 346
  - Density: 80.8/km^{2} (209/sq mi)
- Sex ratio 186 / 160 ♂/♀

Languages
  - Official: Marathi
  - Other spoken: Hindi
- Time zone: UTC+5:30 (IST)
- Website: pune.nic.in

Shire is a village in India, situated in the Mawal taluka of Pune district in the state of Maharashtra. It encompasses an area of 428.39 ha (1,059 acres).

== Administration ==
The village is administrated by a sarpanch, an elected representative who leads a gram panchayat. At the time of the 2011 Census of India, the gram panchayat governed three villages and was based at Ambale.

== Demographics ==
At the 2011 census, the village comprised 66 households. The population of 346 was split between 186 males and 160 females.

== See also ==
- List of villages in Mawal taluka
