= Said Hassan Shire =

Puntland politician

- سعيد حسن شيرى
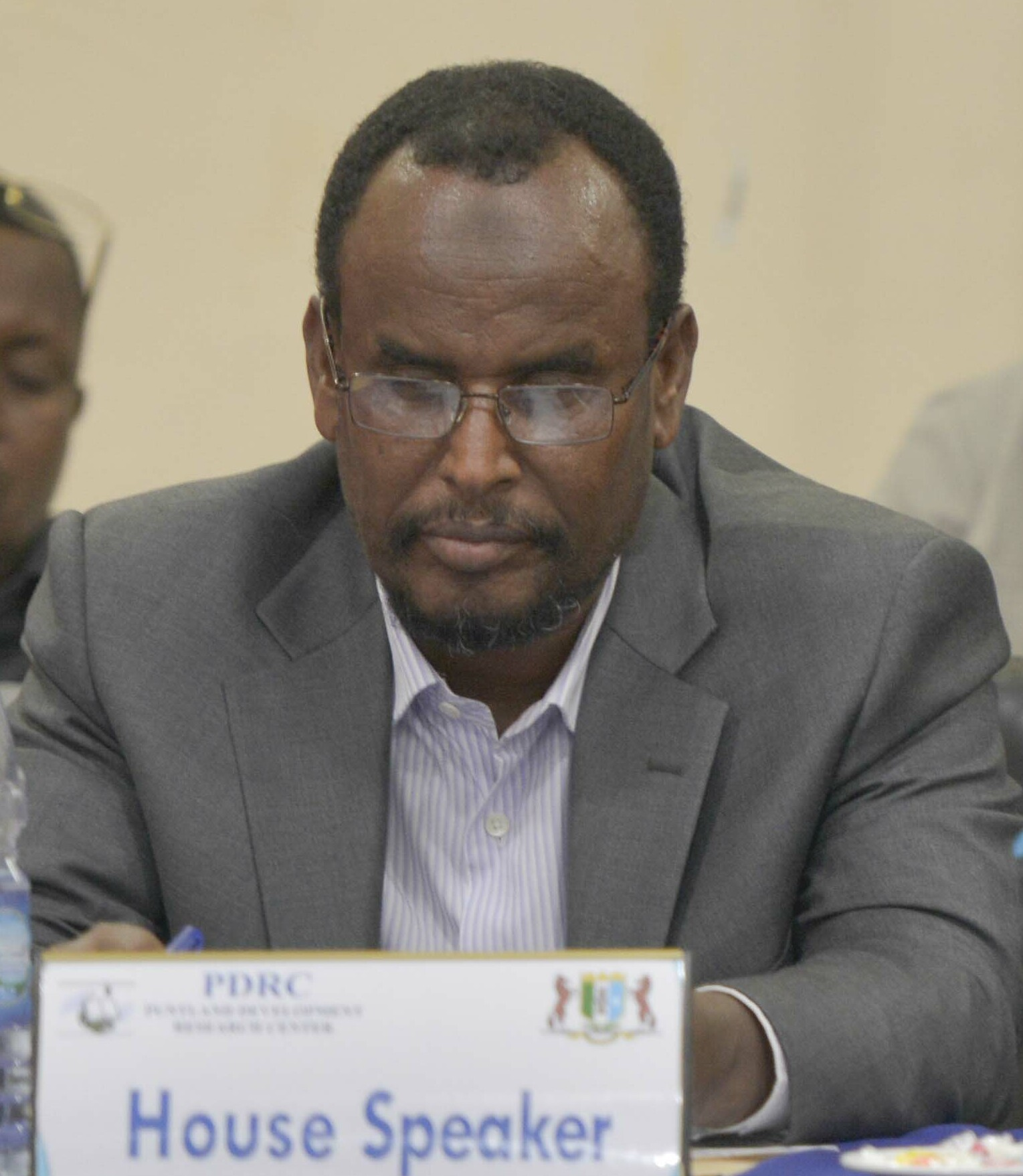

Speaker of the House of Representatives of Puntland
- In office 4 January 2014 – 9 November 2015
- President: Abdiweli Gaas
- Vice President: Abdihakim Abdullahi Haji Omar
- Preceded by: Abdirashid Mohamed Hersi
- Succeeded by: Ahmed Ali Hashi

Personal details
- Party: Independent

Said Hassan Shire (Somali: Siciid Xasan Shire, Arabic: سعيد حسن شيرى) is a Puntland politician. He is the former Speaker of the House of Representatives of Puntland from 4 January 2014 to 9 November 2015.

== Biography ==
Shire is in his 40s, and hails from the eastern Sanaag region of Somaliland.

He has held various positions in both the Puntland regional administration and the central government. In 2000, Shire served as an MP in the Transitional National Government's interim parliament. He later acted as a Deputy Minister in the Transitional Federal Government in 2007. Since 2010, Shire also served as the Puntland Minister of Livestock and Animal Husbandry.

In December 2013, Shire was among 66 new MPs appointed to the Puntland parliament. He subsequently ran for Parliament Speaker during the 2014 Puntland elections, winning the third round ballot 40 votes to 26 votes against the runner-up, former Speaker of Parliament MP Abdirashid Mohamed Hersi of Mudug.
