= Shire Foods =

British food company

Shire Foods is a manufacturer of pies, pasties, and sausage rolls based in Warwickshire, England. Due to increased demand for their products, the company moved in 2004 from Warwick to a new facility in the town of Leamington Spa. The company is family-run and was founded in 1970. It currently employs over 100 people at its factory and is the only major pie manufacturer in the United Kingdom to be EBLEX certified.

Shire Foods created the chicken balti pie. Bescot Stadium, home ground of Walsall Football Club, was the first sporting venue where the product was sold. They are now available at over 60 clubs including Newcastle United Football Club, Coventry City Football Club, and Aston Villa Football Club. Owing to the sales gained by Shire Foods, this type of pie is now also produced by other British pie manufacturers including Birds Eye.

In 2005, they were chosen by Manchester United Football Club to be their pie supplier for the next 3 seasons.
