= James P. McAnulty =

American diplomat

James McAnulty
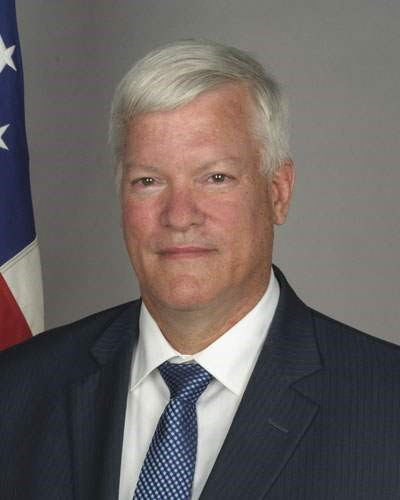

United States Special Representative for Somalia
- In office August 26, 2013 – September 30, 2015
- President: Barack Obama
- Preceded by: Position established
- Succeeded by: David Kaeuper (Acting)

Personal details
- Education: United States Air Force Academy

Military service
- Allegiance: United States
- Branch/service: United States Air Force

James P. McAnulty (sometimes McNulty) is an American diplomat who served as the U.S. Envoy to Somalia.

After the U.S. officially recognized the government of Somalia and reopened its Mission there in 2013 after some 22 years, it continued to be represented in Somalia by a special envoy based at its embassy in Nairobi, Kenya and titled a Special Representative rather than by a U.S. Ambassador. McAnulty, a career foreign service officer (FSO) who joined the U.S. Foreign Service in 1983, was appointed the Mission's Special Representative to Somalia, and he was received as such by the Somalia government on August 26, 2013. McAnulty was last prior to being appointed the U.S. Special Representative to Somalia, the U.S. Deputy Chief of Missions in Nigeria. A graduate of the United States Air Force Academy at Colorado Springs, Colorado, McAnulty served as a commissioned officer in the U.S. Air Force before joining the U.S. Foreign Service.

== Actions as envoy ==
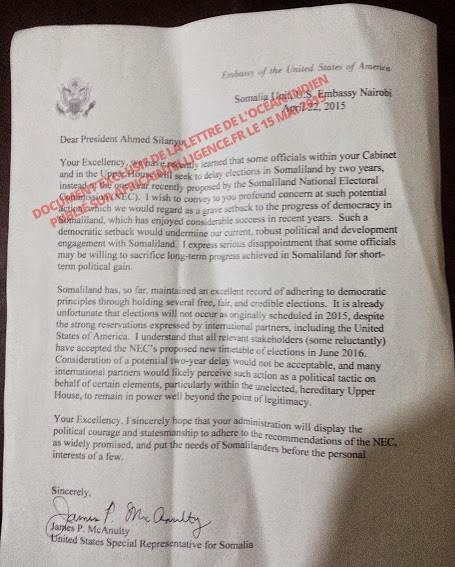

During McAnulty's tenure as envoy to Somalia, the U.S. has been accused by some of using heavy handed tactics to micromanage the country's affairs, even, of waging a "war" against the country, and being insensitive to its peoples' cultures and religious beliefs. In his official capacity as U.S. Special Representative to Somalia, McAnulty in late 2015 threatened significant cuts in U.S. foreign aid to Somalia if its political infighting did not cease. He cautioned Somalia president Silanyo against further delay of parliamentary elections, while tacitly threatening the withdrawal of aid if the elections were not held on schedule. The leaked letter from Envoy McAnulty to Somalia President Ahmed Mohamed Mohamoud "Silanyo" appears at right. McAnulty condemned the August 22 and 23, 2015 Al-Shabaab (militant group) attacks against the Somali National Army, Kenyan Defense Forces and civilians. He also wrote an internet article urging cessation of and condemning the cultural practice of “genital mutilation” (female circumcision) in sub-Saharan Africa. In August 2014, the Somali and U.S. governments reached an agreement in Washington stipulating that the United States would contribute $1.9 million toward security sector reform, development and capacity-building efforts in Somalia, which McAnulty signed on behalf of the U.S. government.

Diplomatic posts
New office	United States Special Representative for Somalia; 2013–2015	Succeeded by David Kaeuper; Acting
