= Abdirahman Farole =

Former President of Puntland from 2009 to 2014

- Cabdiraxmaan Maxamed Faroole عبدالرحمن محمد محمود فارولي
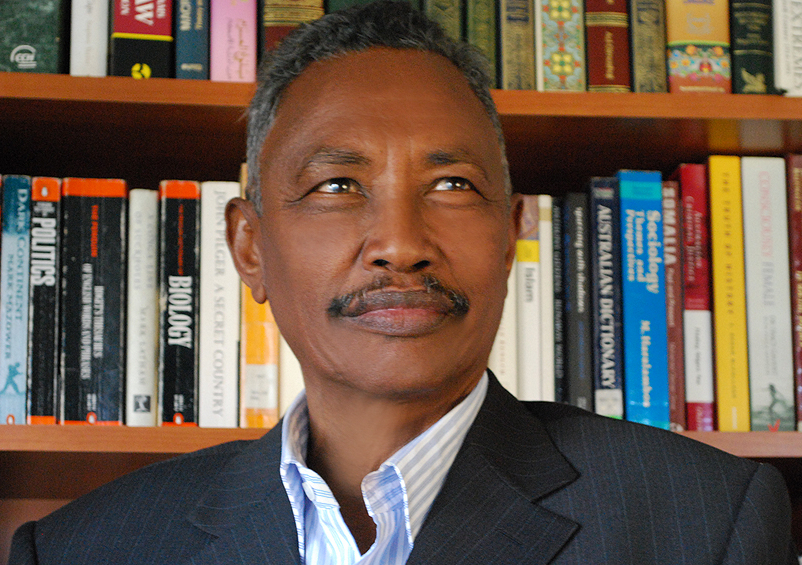

Somali Senator
- Incumbent
- Assumed office 8 January 2017
- Constituency: Nugaal, Puntland

4th President of Puntland
- In office 8 January 2009 – 8 January 2014
- Vice President: Abdisamad Ali Shire
- Preceded by: Mohamud Muse Hersi Adde
- Succeeded by: Abdiweli Mohamed Ali

Personal details
- Born: 1945 (age 80–81) Eyl, Nugal, Puntland
- Party: Horseed
- Education: Somali National University (BCom); La Trobe University (BA); University at Albany (MBA)

Abdirahman Mohamed Mohamoud Farole (Somali: Cabdiraxmaan Maxamed Maxamuud Faroole; Arabic: عبدالرحمن محمد محمود فارولي; born 1945) is a Somali politician. He served for many years in the government, acting as a governor of the Nugal region of Somalia in the 1990s and later as the Minister of Finance of the Government of Puntland. From 8 January 2009 to 8 January 2014, Farole was also the President of Puntland. Farole's multipronged efforts at creating provisions and collaboration with international policies and organizations resulted in a drastic decrease in piracy along the Marinka Gardafuul (Guardafui Channel).

== Biography ==
=== Early years ===
Farole was born in 1945 in the coastal town of Eyl, situated in the northeastern Nugal region of Somalia. He hails from the Reer Jarafle branch of the Isse Mohamoud sub-clan of the Majeerteen, Harti, Darod.

=== Personal life ===
Abdirahman Farole had two wives. Amina Abiib died in 2015. He has lived in Australia on and off for more than ten years. His family lives in Heidelberg of Melbourne, Victoria.

A multi-linguist, he is fluent in Somali, Arabic, Italian and English.

=== Education ===
Farole first pursued his post-secondary education locally, earning a Diploma of Public Health in 1964 from the Scuola Professionale Sanitaria in Mogadishu, the nation's capital. The following year, he earned a Diploma in Statistics from the International Statistical Institute of Beirut in Lebanon.

In 1985, Farole completed a Bachelor of Commerce in Economics and Commerce from the Somali National University in Mogadishu. He followed that five years later with a Master of Business Administration (Major in Financial Management) from a joint partnership between the Somali National University-SOMTAD and the State University of New York at Albany. In 2005, he added to his resume a Bachelor of Arts (Major in Politics) from La Trobe University in Australia.

=== Career ===
In a professional capacity, Farole worked as a senior officer/manager of major branches in Hargeisa and Berbera, and as a senior auditor/divisional manager of foreign and international departments at the Central Bank of Somalia. From 1970 to 1986, he was also director general at the Commercial & Savings Bank.

Top governmental positions Farole has held in the past include a stint as Finance Minister of the Puntland Government under the first president of Puntland, Abdullahi Yusuf Ahmed, and as governor of the Nugaal region in the 1990s. He later served as Planning Minister and international cooperation government of Mohamud "Adde" Muse Hersi, the former president of Puntland. After a falling out with Muse over a deal with the Australian oil company, Range Resources, Farole spent much of the past decade in suburban Melbourne, Australia, where he was a PhD candidate in history at La Trobe University. His dissertation was on the rebuilding of banks and financial institutions after armed conflict.

== President of Puntland ==
=== Appointment ===
After having reportedly turned down requests from his fellow countrymen to run for office in the past, and with the assurance of support from various political factions, Farole returned to Somalia from Australia to present himself as a candidate in the Puntland state third presidential elections. In January 2009, he defeated the nine other candidates, including incumbent President Muse, to become the fourth President of Puntland. Despite weeks of political tension prior to the vote, the election itself was also reportedly peaceful, prompting one US-based observer to suggest that the "success of the Puntland elections can begin to provide a model for the whole of Somalia." In his election victory speech, Farole vowed to tackle head-on the pervasive piracy problem off of the Somali coast, including cracking down on local authorities that were then reportedly collaborating with pirates in return for a share of the profits.

=== General reforms ===
Since taking office in 2009, the Farole administration has implemented numerous political reforms, with an emphasis on the expansion and improvement of Puntland's security and judicial sectors. In an effort to improve transparency, the new president issued a first-ever "100 Days in Office report".

To bolster the Puntland's justice system, numerous new prosecutors, judges and other court personnel as well as additional prison guards were hired and trained. In July 2010, the Puntland Council of Ministers unanimously approved a new anti-terrorism law to more efficiently handle terror suspects and their accomplices; a special court is also expected to be established within the region's existing criminal courts system to facilitate the task.

Fiscally, a transparent, budget-based public finance system was established, which has reportedly helped increase public confidence in government.

More modest reforms were also put into motion in the social sector, particularly in the education and healthcare fields. The regional government hired more healthcare workers and teachers, with major plans underway for school and hospital renovations.

=== Multi-partism ===
On 15 June 2009, the Farole administration passed a new regional draft constitution, which is believed to represent a significant step toward the eventual introduction of a multi-party political system to the region for the first time. Such a system already exists in the adjacent Somaliland region.

On 15 April 2012, the Puntland government opened a four-day constitutional convention officially inaugurating the new state constitution. Overseen by the Puntland Electoral Commission (PEC), the constitution represented the final step in the extant regional democratisation process and was scheduled to be followed by the formation of political parties.

On 12 September 2012, the Puntland Election Commission announced that the registration process for political parties in Puntland was now open. This came after the passing of the Political Association Law, the Referendum Act, the District Elections Law and the inauguration of the state constitution. With District Council elections slated for early 2013, the three political organisations that have earned the most seats across 21 demarcated districts will then constitute the region's official parties. They will also be challengers in the next elections, scheduled for January 2014.

On 12 November 2012, Members of the Puntland House of Representatives amended the Puntland Electoral Law after convening in the state capital, Garowe. The amendment lowers the minimum required number of votes that each political association must secure per province from 500 to 300. It also stipulates that parties should have bureaus open in all of Puntland's eight regions.

On 14 November 2012, Farole announced the launching of his new political party, Horseed. The association counts over 200 members and represents the incumbent Puntland government, including Vice President, Abdisamad Ali Shire and the state Ministers. It is the first prospective party to register for an application with the Transitional Puntland Electoral Commission (TPEC). According to Farole, the general public will be eligible for membership in the organisation once it is selected as an official political party.

=== Puntland Agency For Social Welfare ===
In May 2009 the Puntland Agency for Social Welfare (PASWE) was founded. The agency provides medical, educational and counselling support to vulnerable groups and individuals such as orphans, the disabled and the blind. PASWE is overseen by a board of directors, which consists of religious scholars (ulema), businesspeople, intellectuals and traditional elders.

=== Anti-piracy campaign ===
Between 2009 and 2010, the Farole government enacted a number of reforms and pre-emptive measures as a part of its officially declared anti-piracy campaign. The latter include the arrest, trial and conviction of pirate gangs, as well as raids on suspected pirate hideouts and confiscation of weapons and equipment; ensuring the adequate coverage of the regional authority's anti-piracy efforts by both local and international media; sponsoring a social campaign led by Islamic scholars and community activists aimed at discrediting piracy and highlighting its negative effects; and partnering with the NATO alliance to combat pirates at sea. In May 2010, construction also began on a new naval base in the town of Bandar Siyada, located 25 km west of Bosaso, the commercial capital of Puntland. The facility is funded by Puntland's regional government in conjunction with Saracen International, a UK-based security company, and is intended to assist in more effectively combating piracy. The base will include a center for training recruits, and a command post for the naval force.

These numerous security measures appear to have borne fruit, as many pirates were apprehended in 2010, including a prominent leader. Puntland's security forces also reportedly managed to force out the pirate gangs from their traditional safe havens such as Eyl and Gar'ad, with the pirates now primarily operating from the Galmudug region to the south.

=== Galgala campaign ===
In August 2010, Puntland security forces launched an offensive against militants led by Mohamed Said Atom, an arms-smuggler on both US and U.N. security watch-lists who had vowed war on the Farole administration. The insurgents were reportedly hiding out in the Galgala hills. Atom had fled just before the attack that left more than 100 militants dead, having reportedly misled his men prior to the Puntland army's offensive by promising reinforcements from the Islamist Al-Shabaab group via the town of Burao in the Somaliland region.

By late October, Puntland military personnel had seized the last insurgent outposts, though fighting later sporadically flared up again as militants loyal to Atom attempted to ambush Puntland soldiers.

=== Galmudug Accord ===
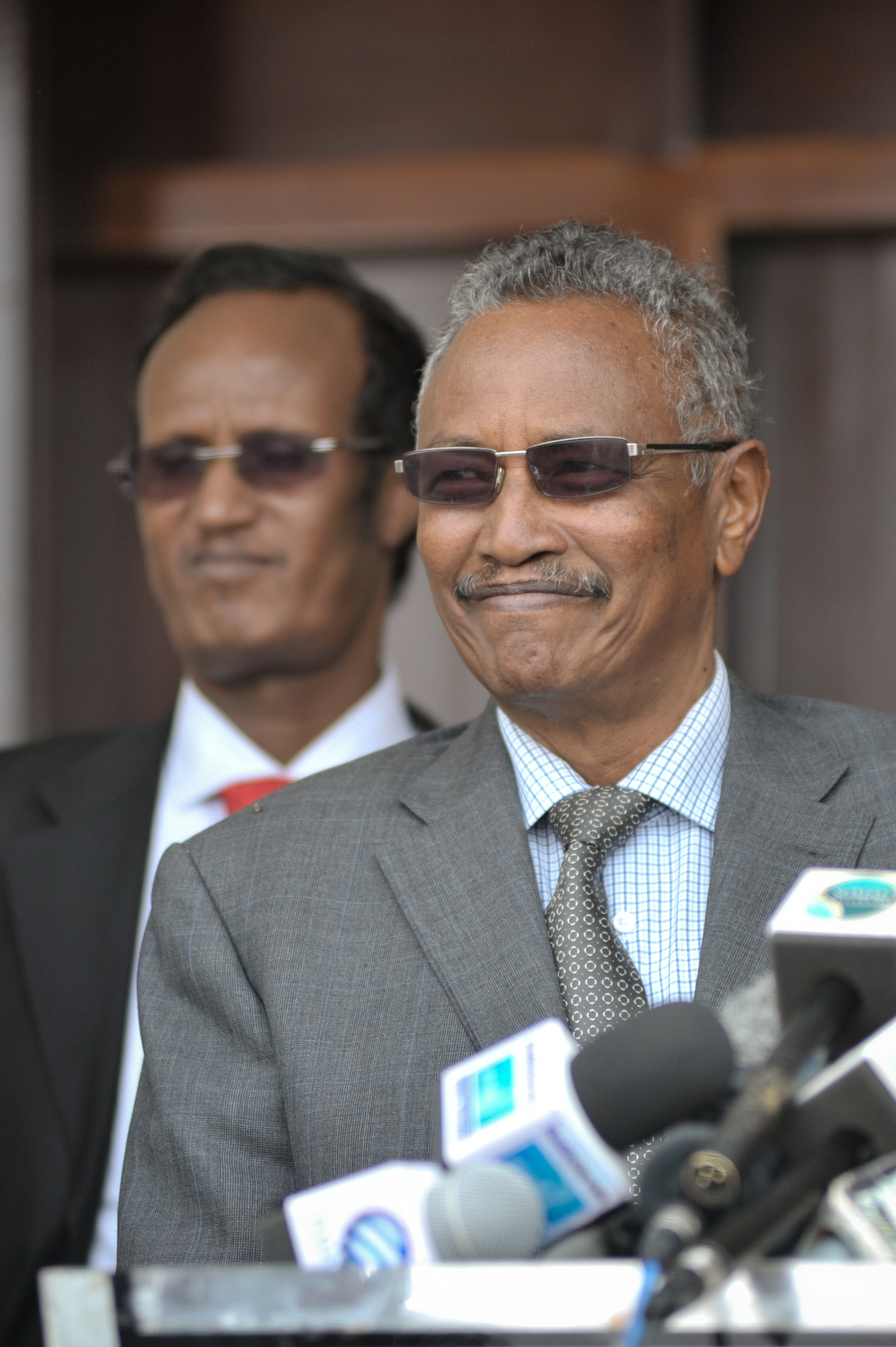
Farole in 2013

In response to sporadic targeted assassination attempts by Al-Shabaab militants against Puntland public officials in the north-central city of Galkayo, the Farole administration in 2010–2011 launched a police crackdown and set in motion comprehensive administrative reform. The Puntland and Galmudug authorities subsequently signed an accord in Garowe in February 2011, officially agreeing to co-operate on security, economic and social matters so as to strengthen inter-regional relations. In April of that year, the Puntland government also replaced the Mudug region's Governor and his deputies and dissolved the local district council. A separate interim regional committee tasked with assuring security was also set up.

=== Puntland Maritime Police Force ===
Following a Puntland-Transitional Federal Government cooperative agreement in August 2011 calling for the creation of a Somali Marine Force, of which the already established Puntland Maritime Police Force (PMPF) would form a part, the Farole administration resumed training of PMPF naval officials. The Puntland Maritime Police Force is a locally recruited, professional maritime security force that is primarily aimed at fighting piracy off of the coast of Somalia, safeguarding the nation's marine resources, and providing logistics support to humanitarian efforts. Supported by the United Arab Emirates, PMPF officials are also trained by the Japanese Coast Guard.

=== Post-transition ===
In February 2012, Farole and other Somali government officials met in Garowe, Puntland's administrative capital, to discuss post-transition arrangements following the end of the TFG's mandate in August 2012. After extensive deliberations attended by regional actors and international observers, the conference ended in a signed agreement between President Farole, TFG President Sharif Sheikh Ahmed, Prime Minister Abdiweli Mohamed Ali, Speaker of Parliament Sharif Hassan Sheikh Aden, Galmudug President Mohamed Ahmed Alim and Ahlu Sunna Waljama'a representative Khalif Abdulkadir Noor stipulating that: a) a new 225 member bicameral parliament would be formed, consisting of an upper house seating 54 Senators as well as a lower house; b) 30% of the National Constituent Assembly (NCA) is earmarked for women; c) the President is to be appointed via a constitutional election; and d) the Prime Minister is selected by the President and he/she then names his/her Cabinet. The agreements were known as the Garowe Principles. On 23 June 2012, Farole and the Somali federal and regional leaders met again and approved a draft constitution after several days of deliberation. The new law was scheduled to be ratified by the National Constituent Assembly, with a plebiscite then expected to be held to render the bill permanent.

On 23 June 2012, the Somali federal and regional leaders met again and approved a draft constitution after several days of deliberation. The National Constituent Assembly overwhelmingly passed the new constitution on 1 August, with 96% voting for it, 2% against it, and 2% abstaining.

=== Term extension ===
In late 2012, Farole announced his intention to extend his term as President of Puntland for one more year, pushing back regional elections to 2014. The move was met with resistance by many public officials and civilians, who asserted that he had been elected in the 2009 presidential elections to serve over a four-year period, with the next ballot scheduled to take place in January 2013. Farole argued that the new Puntland Constitution, adopted in April 2012, mandated his administration to serve a five-year-term. Street protests in connection with the term extension were held in Qardho on the eve of Farole's fourth anniversary in office, but were reportedly free of violence. Anti-riot police were also deployed in the littoral hub of Bosaso to ensure security. In his speech marking the historic day, Farole highlighted his administration's various achievements during its tenure, particularly in terms of commerce and counter-piracy operations. The remarks came after the Puntland parliament had on 7 January approved a $49 million state budget for the year, up $10.6 million from 2012's budget.

=== Oil exploration ===
In 2012, the Farole administration gave the green light to the first official oil exploration project in Puntland and Somalia at large. Led by the Canadian oil company Africa Oil and its partner Range Resources, initial drilling in the Shabeel-1 well on Puntland's Dharoor Block in March of the year successfully yielded oil.

=== Puntland presidential election ===
In 2013, Farole ran for a second term as President of the autonomous Puntland state in the northeastern region's 2014 elections. On 8 January 2014, the first and second rounds of voting saw 9 of the 11 presidential contenders eliminated from the running, with Farole and former Prime Minister of Somalia Abdiweli Mohamed Ali left to face off in the third round. Farole initially led the final round with 31 votes, with Ali receiving 18 votes. However, a late rally by Ali saw him eventually win the election, narrowly defeating Farole by 33 votes to 32.

In his acceptance speech, Ali expressed gratitude for the opportunity as well as the work of the Farole administration. He also pledged to defend and adhere to the Puntland Constitution. For his part, Farole indicated that he accepted the outcome of the election, and felicitated Ali on his victory. Farole also reminded Ali of the responsibility now bestowed upon him as leader, urging the new President-elect to prioritise Puntland's interests and calling on all government officials, workers and security forces to co-operate with the region's new leadership.

Shortly after the announcement of the election result, President of Somalia Hassan Sheikh Mohamud also described Puntland as a democratic model for the rest of the country, and thanked the outgoing regional President Farole for accepting the ballot outcome with grace and for his leadership in Puntland over the past half-decade. Describing the moment as a great day for Somalia, Prime Minister Abdiweli Sheikh Ahmed in turn commended the Puntland authorities for ensuring that the elections were peaceful, free and fair. He also thanked President Farole for his service to Puntland.

UN Special Representative for Somalia Nicholas Kay likewise noted that Puntland was spearheading Somalia's ongoing federalisation, and hailed the region's MPs, Speaker and traditional leaders for their respective roles in the election process. He also commended former Puntland President Farole for the latter's constructive role and peaceful transfer of power. Additionally, the US Special Representative for Somalia James P. McAnulty issued a statement saluting Puntland residents for having conducted the ballot in a democratic manner. McAnulty also paid tribute to Farole for his many achievements during his tenure, including his emphasis on security and his key role in the Roadmap federal transition process.

On 14 January 2014, former Puntland President Farole officially handed over power to his successor Ali. The transfer ceremony was held at the Puntland State House in Garowe, with incumbent Puntland Vice-President Abdihakim Abdullahi Haji Omar, former Puntland Vice-President Abdisamad Ali Shire, outgoing and erstwhile Puntland cabinet ministers, the Ethiopian consul-general in the region, UNSOM officials and other international representatives in attendance. During his hand over speech, Farole recapped the accomplishments of his administration, and noted a number of infrastructural development projects in the region that were scheduled for implementation. He also thanked all members of government for having worked for the greater communal good, and pledged to assist the incoming leadership with any advice and consultations should it require them. President Ali in turn thanked the outgoing Puntland administration for its achievements, and vowed to continue and build on them. Wishing Farole well in his future endeavours, Ali also noted that his administration would benefit going forward from Farole's advice and support as a statesman.

== Awards ==
In January 2011, Farole was named 2010 Person of the Year by various Somali media outlets for his numerous administrative and social reforms and initiatives.

== See also ==
- Puntland
- Ibrahim Artan Ismail
- Eng Mohamed Isse Lacle

== Notes ==
Political offices
Preceded by Mohamud Muse Hersi	President of Puntland; 2009-2014	Succeeded by Abdiweli Gaas
