= Abdisamad Ali Shire =

Vice President of Puntland from 2009 to 2014

Gen Abdisamad Ali Shire
- Cabdisamad Cali Shire; Abdulzamad Ali Şire عبد الصمد علي شيري
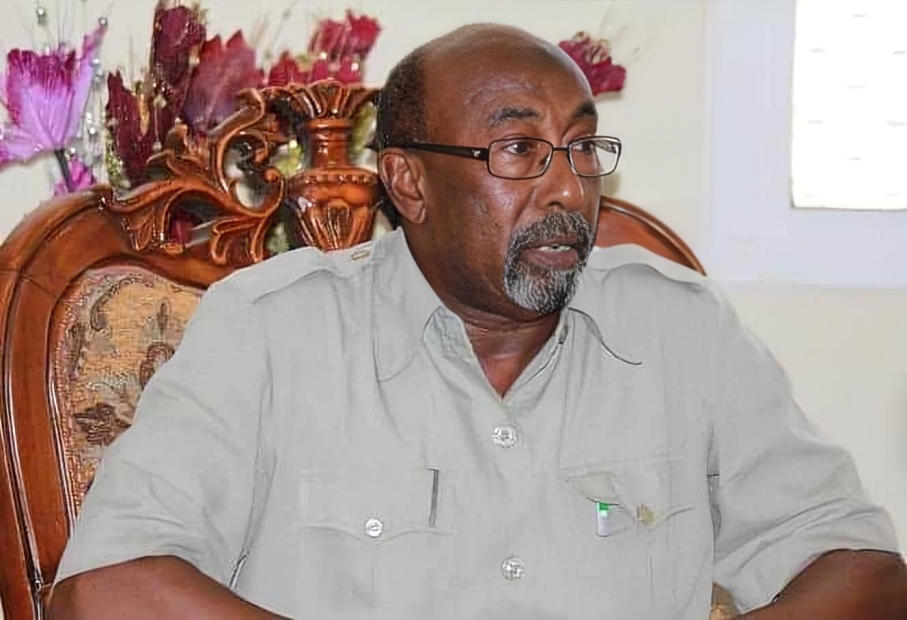
- Shire in 2019

4th Vice President of Puntland
- In office 8 January 2009 – 8 January 2014
- President: Abdirahman Farole
- Preceded by: Hassan Dahir Afqurac
- Succeeded by: Abdihakim Abdullahi Haji Omar

Personal details
- Born: Taleh, Sool, SomaliaPuntland
- Died: May 20, 2021 Mogadishu, Somalia
- Cause of death: COVID-19
- Resting place: Garowe
- Party: Horseed

Military service
- Allegiance: (Somalia) Somali Democratic Republic (until 1991)
- Rank: Major General
- Battles/wars: Ogaden War

Abdisamad Ali Shire (Somali: Cabdisamad Cali Shiire, Arabic: عبد الصمد علي شيري) was a Somali politician and military officer who served as the Vice President of Puntland from January 8, 2009, to January 8, 2014.

== Personal life ==
Shire was born in Taleh, situated in the Sool region. He is from the Nur Ahmed sublineage of the Ugadhyahan sub-clan of the Mohamoud Garad, which one of the main branches of the Dhulbahante tribe, a sub-division of the Harti Darod clan. Shire was an army colonel in the Puntland's Dervish Army section of the military from 2002 to 2004.

== Puntland Vice President ==
=== Vice President of Puntland ===
==== Garowe Principles ====
In February 2012, Shire and other Somali government officials met in Garowe, Puntland's administrative capital, to discuss post-transition arrangements following the end of the Transitional Federal Government (TFG)'s mandate in August 2012. After extensive deliberations attended by regional actors and international observers, the conference ended in a signed agreement between Puntland President Abdirahman Mohamud Farole, TFG President Sharif Sheikh Ahmed, Prime Minister Abdiweli Mohamed Ali, Speaker of Parliament Sharif Hassan Sheikh Aden, Galmudug President Mohamed Ahmed Alim and Ahlu Sunna Waljama'a representative Khalif Abdulkadir Noor stipulating that: a) a new 225 member bicameral parliament would be formed, consisting of an upper house seating 54 Senators as well as a lower house; b) 30% of the National Constituent Assembly (NCA) is earmarked for women; c) the President is to be appointed via a constitutional election; and d) the Prime Minister is selected by the President and he/she then names his/her Cabinet. The agreements were known as the Garowe Principles. On 23 June 2012, the Somali federal and regional leaders met again and approved a draft constitution after several days of deliberation. The National Constituent Assembly overwhelmingly passed the new constitution on 1 August, with 96% voting for it, 2% against it, and 2% abstaining.

==== Horseed ====
On 14 November 2012, President Farole announced the launching of his new political party, Horseed. The association counted over 200 members and represented the incumbent Puntland government, including Vice President Shire and the state Ministers. It was the first prospective party to register for an application with the Transitional Puntland Electoral Commission (TPEC).

==== Puntland presidential election (2014) ====
In 2013, Shire ran for a second term as Vice President of the autonomous Puntland state in the northeastern region's 2014 elections. He lost out to Abdihakim Abdullahi Haji Omar.

== Death ==
On 20 May 2021, Shire died in Mogadishu. former vice President of Puntland Abdisamad Ali Shire has been buried in the Puntland capital of Garoowe by the President of Puntland Said Abdullahi Deni attended his funeral.

== See also ==
- Abdirahman Mohamud Farole

Political offices
Preceded by Hassan Dahir Afqurac	Vice President of Puntland; 2009-2014	Succeeded by Abdihakim Abdullahi Haji Omar
