= Omar Ismail Waberi =

Somali politician and entrepreneur

- عمر إسماعيل وبيري

Member of the Federal Parliament of Somalia
- Incumbent
- Assumed office November 2016

Omar Ismail Waberi (Somali: Omar Ismaaciil Waaberi, Arabic: عمر إسماعيل وبيري) is a Somali politician, entrepreneur and businessman. He served as member of the Federal Parliament of Somalia and now he is the chairman of Bosaso Livestock health guarantee center known as Mahjar.

== Career ==
=== Federal Parliament ===
On 5 November 2016, Waberi was unanimously elected as a member of the Federal Parliament of Somalia.

=== Horcad ===
On 5 December 2012, Waberi and other politicians officially launched new political party named "Hor-cad", an abbreviation of Horumar and Caddaalad, which are Somali terms for "Development & Justice". A few months later the party convention was held, Waberi was elected the leader of the party. Horcad was among several political parties registered to run to puntland local councils and presidential election before Puntland government formally suspended multiple party political system.

Waberi was the first man to bring Somalia livestock health guarantee programme, which is popularly known Mahjar. Waberi is the head of other business entities.
