= Said Mohamed Rage =

Puntland politician

- سعيد محمد راجي

Ministry of Sea Transport, Ports and Maritime Crime Prevention
- In office 1 March 2010 – 8 January 2014

Personal details
- Born: Bosaso, Puntland

Said Mohamed Rage (Somali: Siciid Maxamed Raage, Arabic: سعيد محمد راجي) is a Puntland politician. He has become the Minister of Ports, Marine Transport and Marine Resource of the Puntland Government. Rage is also in charge and founder of the regional counter-piracy program. He is also the head of the other major political and business entities. During Arte Somali Peace Conference Rage became an MP at transitional parliament and resigned seat following year.

== Background ==
Rage was born in the autonomous region of Puntland in northeastern Somalia, hailing Dishiishe. He is a dual citizen holding British and Somali citizenships.
