= Shires (surname) =

Shires is a surname of British origin. Notable people with the surname include:

- Abe Shires (1917–1993), American football player
- Alan Shires (born 1948), English footballer
- Amanda Shires (born 1982), American singer-songwriter and violinist
- Art Shires (1906–1967), American baseball player
- Ben Shires (born 1985), British television presenter
- Corbin Shires (born 1997), English footballer
- Dana Shires (born 1932), American physician, co-inventor of Gatorade
- Jim Shires (born 1945), Canadian ice hockey player
- Tom Shires (1925–2007), American trauma surgeon
