= Garowe Principles =

Treaty between Somali TFG government and states (2011)

Garowe Principles I and II
- Signed: 15 February 2012
- Location: Garowe, Puntland, Somalia
- Original signatories: (Somalia) Transitional Federal Government; Puntland; Galmudug; Ahlu Sunnah Waljama'a
- Languages: Somali and English

The Garowe Principles were a set of agreements between the Transitional Federal Government (TFG) of Somalia and various Somali stakeholders outlining a framework for the interim administration's scheduled political transition in August 2012 to a permanent, representative government. The agreements were signed during the Somali National Consultative Constitutional Conference held in Garowe, the administrative capital of the autonomous Puntland region. The conference was attended by representatives from the TFG, Puntland, Galmudug, Ahlu Sunna Waljama'a, and civil society groups from various parts of the country.

== Somali National Consultative Constitutional Conference ==
In the first conference held on 15 December 2011, the signatories agreed on the following key provisions:

- downsizing the national parliament
- creating a bicameral federal legislature
- assuring women at least 30% of parliament seats
- establishing a national constituent assembly to oversee implementation of the principles.

The choice between a presidential or hybrid governing systems would be decided at a later point. This agreement is known as the Garowe Principles I.

The second conference was held on 15 February 2012. The signatories agreed on reaffirming the Garowe I Principles, the establishment of federal states as referenced in the Transitional Federal Charter of 2004, deciding the status of Mogadishu by a federal parliament, and recognizing Puntland as a founding federal state. This agreement was the final accord of the conference and is known as the Garowe Principles II.

== London Somalia Conference ==
The London Somalia Conference held in London on 23 February 2012 was attended by 55 delegations from Somalia and the international community. In its communiqué, the conference:

- agreed that the mandate of the Transitional Federal Institutions ends in August 2012, as planned
- endorsed the Garowe Principles, including Garowe II, and undertook to reward progress and thwart parties impeding the political process

The host of the conference Prime Minister David Cameron mentioned in his opening speech that the second meeting held in Garowe had made real progress. The UN Secretary General also stated that he welcomed the resolutions of the Garowe II conference, adding that they "significantly advance the road map and make the peace process more inclusive."

== Galkayo Amendment ==
On 29 March 2012, signatories of the Garowe Principles and Mogadishu Roadmap met in Galkayo to amend and monitor the progress of implementation of the signed agreements. One notable change was the decrease in members of the National Constituent Assembly (NCA) from 1000 to 825. President Farole and other signatories also agreed to for traditional leaders chosen to select the NCA members to meet on 25 April.
