= Shire Haji Farah =

Puntland politician

Shire Haji Farah Yusuf شيري حاجي فرح
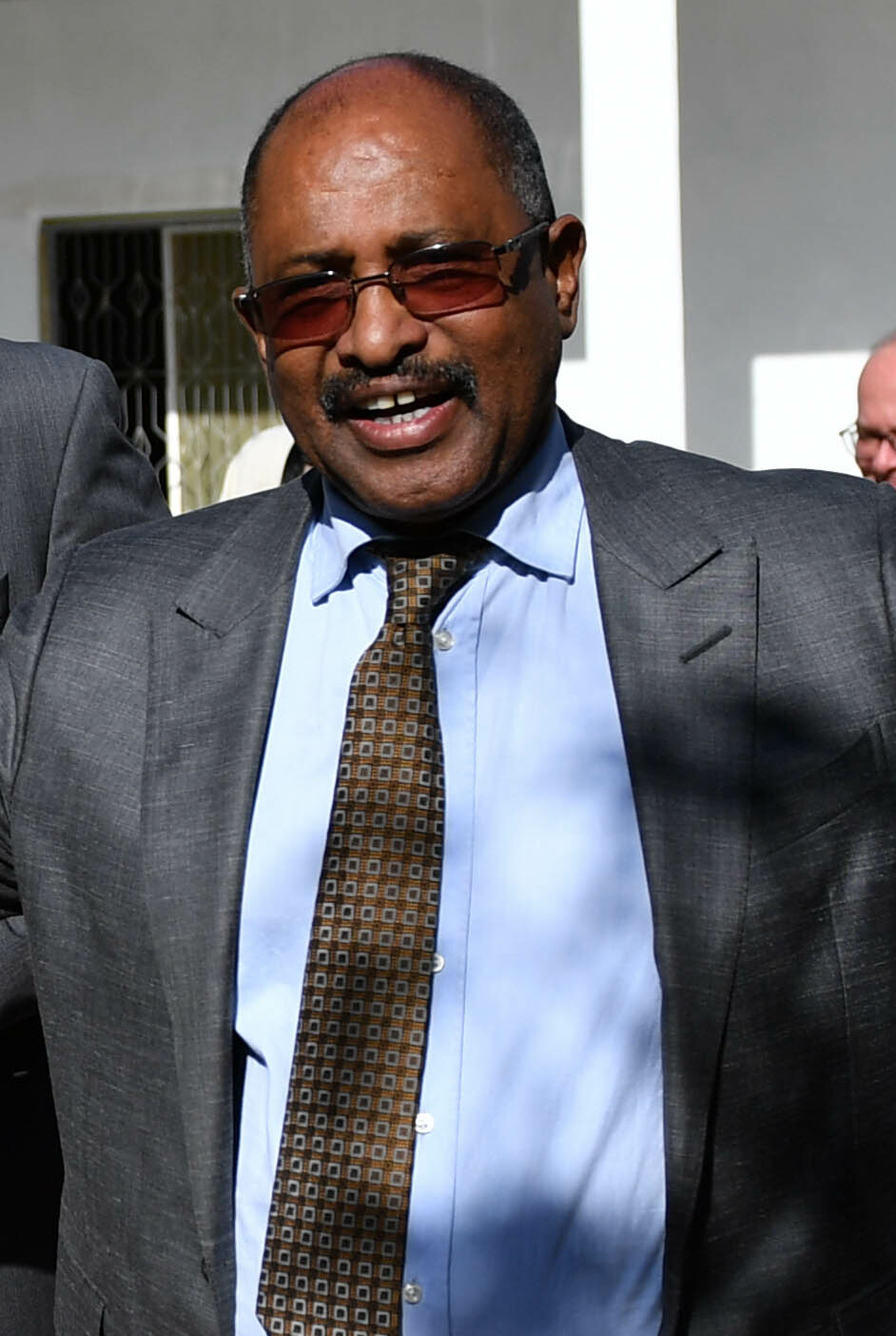

Puntland Minister of Finance
- In office 28 January 2014 – 13 June 2015
- President: Abdiweli Gaas
- Vice President: Abdihakim Abdullahi Haji Omar
- Preceded by: Farah Ali Jama
- Succeeded by: Abdullahi Aarshe

Puntland Minister of Planning
- In office 13 June 2015 – 11 February 2019
- President: Abdiweli Gaas
- Vice President: Abdihakim Abdullahi Haji Omar
- Preceded by: Daud Bisinle
- Succeeded by: Abdiqafar Hange
- Incumbent
- Assumed office 17 June 2015

Personal details
- Born: January 5, 1950 (age 76) Bosaso, Majeerteeniya Italian Somaliland
- Party: Independent

Shire Haji Farah Yusuf (Somali: Shire Xaaji Faarax, Arabic: شيري حاجي فرح; born January 5, 1950) is a Puntland politician who served Minister of Finance later Minister of Planning and International Relations during Presidency of Abdiweli Gaas from January 2014 to January 2019.

== Biography ==
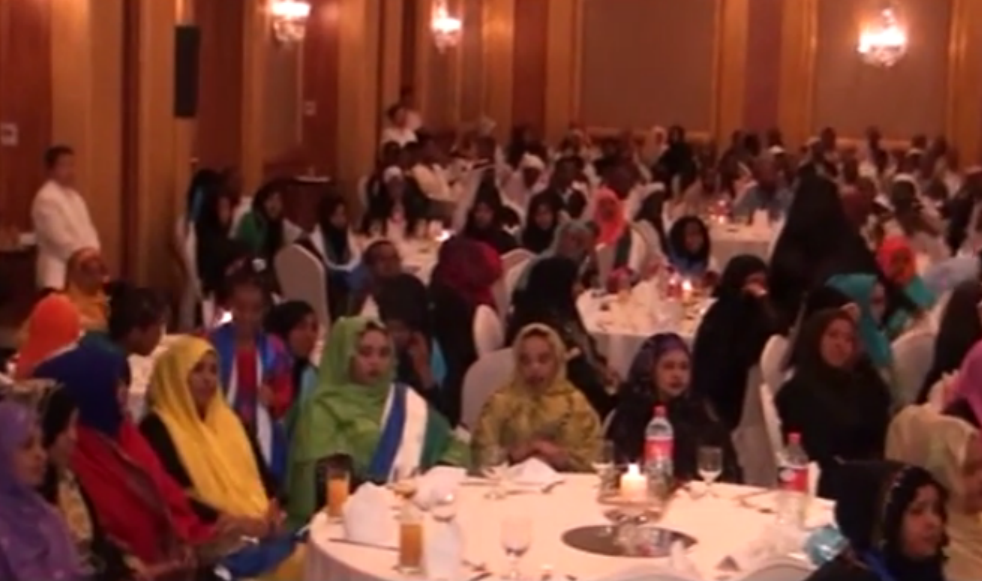
Somali women at a political function in Dubai in support of Shire Haji Farah's candidacy for President of Puntland (November 2013).

Farah hails from Bari region of Puntland. He belongs to the Ali Suleiman sub-clan of the Majeerteen Harti Darod.

By profession, Farah is a successful entrepreneur. He is an Executive Committee Member of the Somali Business Council based in the United Arab Emirates.

In 2013, Farah presented himself as a candidate in the 2014 Puntland presidential elections, which took place on 8 January 2014 in Garowe. He was eliminated in the first round of voting, with former Prime Minister of Somalia Abdiweli Mohamed Ali declared the winner.

== Minister of Finance ==
=== Appointment ===
On 28 January 2014, Farah was appointed Puntland's Minister of Finance by the region's new President Abdiweli Mohamed Ali. He replaced Farah Ali Jama at the post.

== Minister of Planning and International Relations ==
=== Appointment ===
on June 17, 2015 Farah was appointed's Minister of Planning and International Relations by the President Abdiweli Mohamed Ali.

=== Regional tax reform ===
In April 2014, Farah's Ministry of Finance announced that the Puntland government would start taxation of UN and international organizations working in Puntland. According to the head of the Nugal tax department Abdiwahab Farah Ali, this is the first such initiative undertaken in the regional state, and is expected to raise available revenue for local development projects by the new Puntland authorities. The decision is part of a pledge by Puntland President Abdiweli Mohamed Ali to increase the government's development funding in part through higher taxation. Toward this end, the Puntland government already increased taxes on commercial firms operating in the state in order to meet regional financing benchmarks.

=== Military command ===
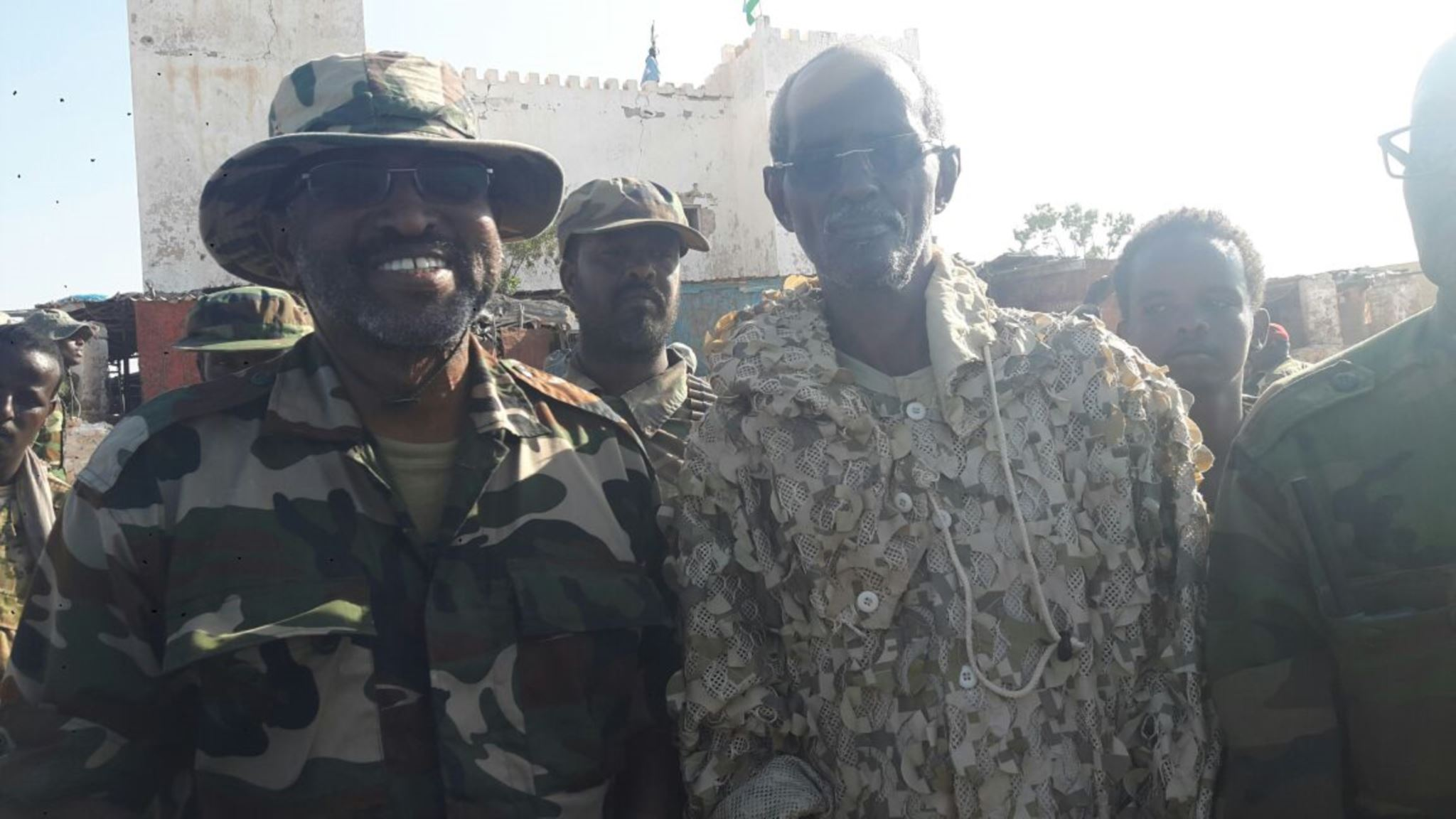
Farah and Bari region governor Yusuf Mohamed Dhedo at Qandala after the town's recapture from ISS on 7 December 2016.

In December 2016, Farah led the Puntland Security Force's counter-offensive against the ISS-occupied town of Qandala during the Qandala campaign. His forces succeeded in retaking Qandala on 7 December 2016. Farah then asked refugees to "return to the town, to come; we want to tell them that the town is peaceful, [we] will help them resettle."

== See also ==
- Ibrahim Artan Ismail
