= Horseed (political party) =

Political party in Somalia

Horseed Political Association Urur Siyaasadeedka Horseed
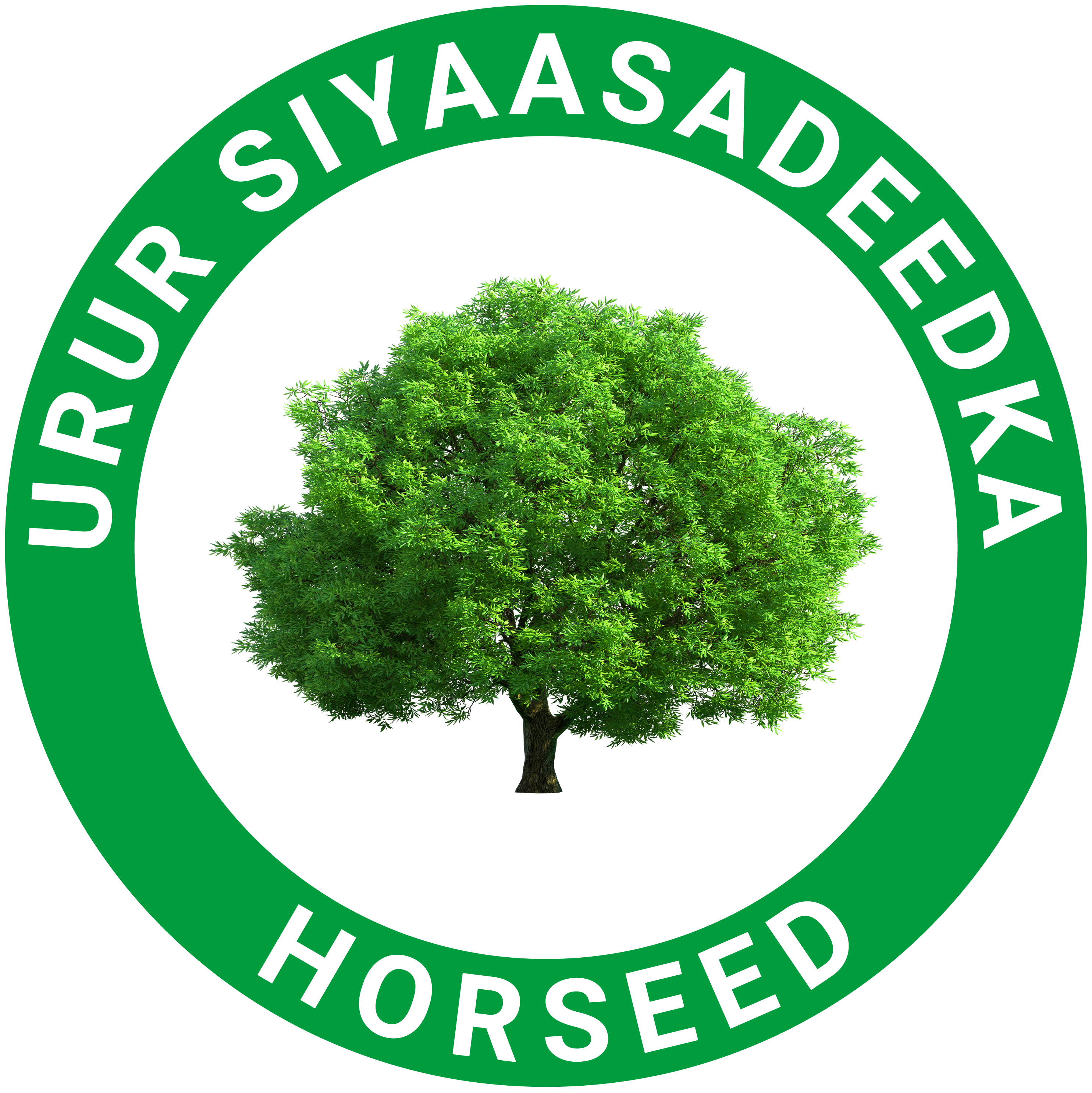
- Chairperson: Abdirahman Farole
- Founder: Abdirahman Farole
- Founded: 14 November 2012
- Headquarters: Garowe, Puntland
- Ideology: Social conservatism
- Political position: Centre-right

Party flag

Website
- www.horseedpoliticalparty.com

Horseed (Somali: Urur Siyaasadeedka Horseed, lit. 'lead' or 'pioneer') is a political party based in Garowe, the administrative capital of the autonomous Puntland state in northeastern Somalia.

== Overview ==
On 14 November 2012, President of Puntland Abdirahman Farole announced the launching of his new political party, Horseed. The association counts over 200 members and represents the incumbent Puntland government, including Vice President Abdisamad Ali Shire and the state Ministers. It is the first prospective party to register for an application with the Transitional Puntland Electoral Commission (TPEC). According to Farole, the general public will be eligible for membership in the organization once it is selected as an official political party. Farole made a speech in Parliament after announcing the first political party in Puntland discussing Puntland's transition to a democratic system.

The first Horseed conference was held on 30 January 2013.

On 3 July 2013, in the second phase of demonstrations in the Qardho, supporters marched through city squares carrying the party's logo and the slogans of the organization they are campaigning for in the upcoming local elections. The Chairman of Horseed in Karkar region Gani Muse Guelleh described the organization as the one that paved the way for democracy in Puntland and should be elected in order to achieve the desired progress. The party also carried out its election campaign to local councils in Bosaso, Garowe and other areas.

On 11 July 2013, during a rally held by Horseed in Garowe, Farole has called on the people of Puntland to support change and participate in the local government elections which must pass on 15 July. He said that the current system in Puntland is one of the promises made by the parties in the 2009 elections, and he added that they will implement this system:

Vote for whomever you want. If you want to vote, don't vote for Horseed, but many people are in the middle and they think things are not going well. Many are obstructing the development of the nation.

The president also said that he welcomes the other recognized organizations, and pointed out that this system is a general honor for all Somalis, as it leaves the clan system.

== See also ==
- Political parties in Somalia
