= Isaaq migrations =

13–20th century expansions of Isaaq clan-family

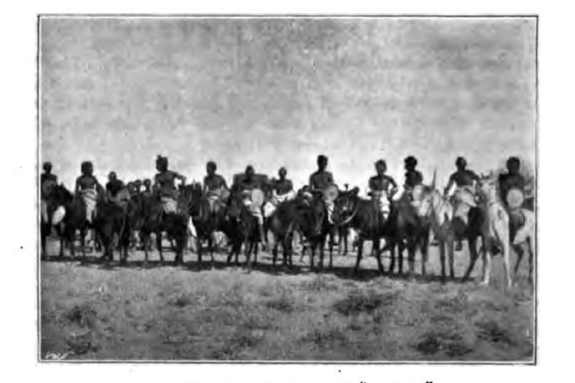
- Isaaq horsemen of the Habr Je'lo clan, 1898
- Date: 12th-20th century
- Location: Horn of Africa
- Participants: Various isaaq subclans
- Outcome: Isaaq settlement of most of modern day Somaliland, Haud and parts of Yemen and kenya around Lake Naivasha

The Isaaq clans began migrating from their ancestral homeland in the city of Maydh, eventually settling and dispersing across various regions of the Horn of Africa. These migrations were part of the broader movements of the Somali people around the Horn, which contributed to the establishment of Somali settlements in their present-day territories.

== Overview ==
The Isaaq people traditionally claim to have descended from Sheikh Ishaaq bin Ahmed, an Islamic scholar who purportedly traveled to Somaliland in the 12th or 13th century and married two women; one from the local Dir clan. and the other from the neighboring Harari people. He is said to have sired eight sons who are the common ancestors of the clans of the Isaaq clan-family. He remained in Maydh until his death.

Somali genealogical tradition and historical accounts places the origin of the Isaaq tribe in the 11th or 12th, century with the arrival of the Sheikh Ishaaq Bin Ahmed (Sheikh Ishaaq) from Arabia. Muhammad ibn Hassan Al Basri, Who was a near contemporary of Sheikh Ishaaq After his settlement in Maydh, Wrote a book compiling stories and poems about him, Which was referenced by the Hashemite scholar Imam Muhammad ‘Azza Ad Din Al Gherbani in his book “Al-‘Asjad al-manẓūm fī al-tārīkh wa al-‘ulūm. Makhtūṭat sīrat al-Sharīf Isḥāq ibn Aḥmad fī al-Yaman wa al-Ṣūmāl”, Better known as the Gherbani Manuscript in the 19th century. Sheikh Ishaaq settled in the coastal town of Maydh in modern-day northeastern Somaliland.Hence, Sheikh Ishaaq married two local women in Somaliland, which left him with eight.

There are also numerous existing hagiographies in Arabic which describe Sheikh Ishaaq's travels, works and overall life in modern Somaliland, as well as his movements in Arabia before his arrival. Besides historical sources, one of the more recent printed biographies of Sheikh Ishaaq is the Amjaad of Sheikh Husseen bin Ahmed Darwiish al-Isaaqi as-Soomaali, which was printed in Aden in 1955.

== Early migrations west ==
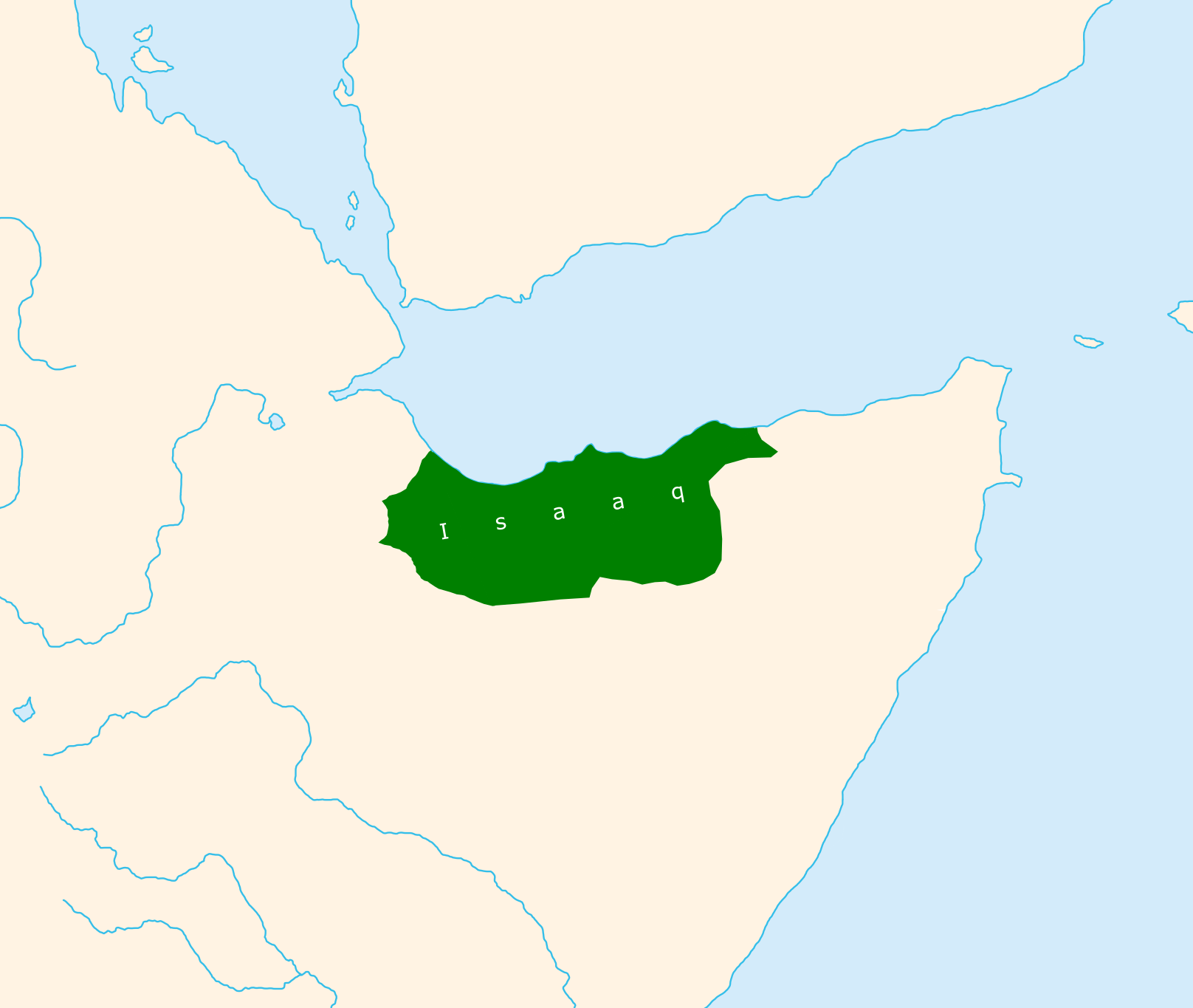
Extent of the Isaaq clan-family at the end of the 19th century

As the Isaaq grew in size and numbers during the 12th century, the clan-family migrated and spread from their core area in Mait (Maydh) and the wider Sanaag region in a southwestward expansion over a wide portion of present-day Somaliland by the 15th and 16th centuries. As the Isaaq expanded the earlier Dir communities of Mait and the wider Sanaag region were driven westwards and to the south towards their present positions. In this general expansion the Isaaq split up into their present component segments, however one fraction of the Habar Yunis clan, the Muse 'Arre, remains behind in Mait as the custodians of the tomb of Sheikh Ishaaq. By the 1300s the Isaaq clans united to defend their inhabited territories and resources during clan conflicts against migrating clans.

The Isaaq also played a prominent role in the Ethiopian-Adal War (1529–1543, referred to as the "Conquest of Abyssinia") in the army of Ahmad ibn Ibrahim al-Ghazi, The Habr Magadle division (Ayoub, Garhajis, Habr Awal and Arap) of the Isaaq were mentioned in chronicles of that war written by Shihab Al-Din Ahmad Al-Gizany known as Futuh al-Habasha.

According to I.M Lewis

The Marrehan and the Habr Magadle [Magādi] also play a very prominent role (...) The text refers to two Ahmads's with the nickname 'Left-handed'. One is regularly presented as 'Ahmad Guray, the Somali' (...) identified as Ahmad Guray Xuseyn, chief of the Habr Magadle. Another reference, however, appears to link the Habr Magadle with the Marrehan. The other Ahmad is simply referred to as 'Imam Ahmad' or simply the 'Imam'.This Ahmad is not qualified by the adjective Somali (...) The two Ahmad's have been conflated into one figure, the heroic Ahmed Guray (...)

After the war, the Isaaq clans (along with other tribes like the Daarood) grew in numbers and territory in the northeast, causing them to began to vie with their Oromo neighbours, who were expanding northwards themselves after the Great Oromo Migrations, thus creating a general thrust toward the southwest. The Isaaq, along with Darood subclans pushed westwards into the plains of Jigjiga and further, beyond where they played an important role in the Adal Sultanate's campaigns against Christian Abyssinia. By the 16th to 17th century the movements that followed seem to have established the Isaaqs on coastal Somaliland, while also having taken over much of Somaliland in that time period pushing the Oromo from the area.

== Migrations southwards ==
According to oral tradition, the Isaaqs, who were established in the coastal areas with a kingdom led by the Tol jeclo branch of the wider Isaaq family, began regularly fighting with the Darood tribes who lived to the south. The war was long and destructive, with both the Isaaqs and Daroods suffering heavy losses of life.

The Isaaq kingdom and the King Harun dhuh barar was eventually overthrown by a coalition of Isaaq clans led by a military leader named Abdi Eisa. According to tradition, Abdi Eisa successfully led the Isaaq forces in the Battle of Lafaruug, where they defeated the Absame tribes at the town of Lafaruug near Berbera— a region where the Isaaq clan had expanded about a century earlier.

Following his victory, Abdi Eisa was offered the position of Sultan of the Isaaq, but he declined. Instead, he suggested that his underage son, Guled Abdi, be crowned while he ruled as regent until his son came of age. The Isaaq gradually expanded their territory, reaching as far south as Toon and the edges of the Hawd by the beginning of the 19th century. The newly established Isaaq Sultanate subsequently made Toon its capital.

== Migrations into the Hawd ==
Throughout the 19th and early 20th centuries, the Isaaq clan expanded its presence in the Hawd region following a series of military victories against various neighboring clans. Among these conflicts were the Rayyad Wars, led by Hersi Amman of the Habr Yunis and his successors, against the Dhulbahante and Ogaden tribes.

After the defeat of the Dervish movement in 1920, the Isaaq launched a series of raids and military campaigns against the Dhulbahante and Ogaden clans, who were left vulnerable. The Isaaq clans moved deep into the Ogaden region, where they were increasingly seen by the Ogaden clan as "sub-imperialists". The Isaaqs reached as far as the Hiiraan region in southern Somalia, the local complained saying “the invaders took everything and left nothing for us”. The intensity of these raids significantly weakened the resistance of the Dhulbahante and Ogaden, leading many to abandon their traditional grazing lands in the Hawd region. Others were forced to adopt a modus vivendi with the advancing Isaaq.

The Isaaq expanse south was not limited to the Ogaden and Harti Darod, but also affected the Marehan who suffered from a series of devastating raids by the Habr Yunis, including a particular 1921 raid that killed the father of then ten-year-old Siad Barre. This event is posited by some scholars to have deeply affected him.

These conflicts inspired the creation of a series of poetic exchanges between the Isaaq and Darod clans, known collectively as the Guba Poems. The historian Siegbert Uhlig, commenting on the significance of the Guba, highlights the historical narrative conveyed in the poetry of Ali Dhuh:

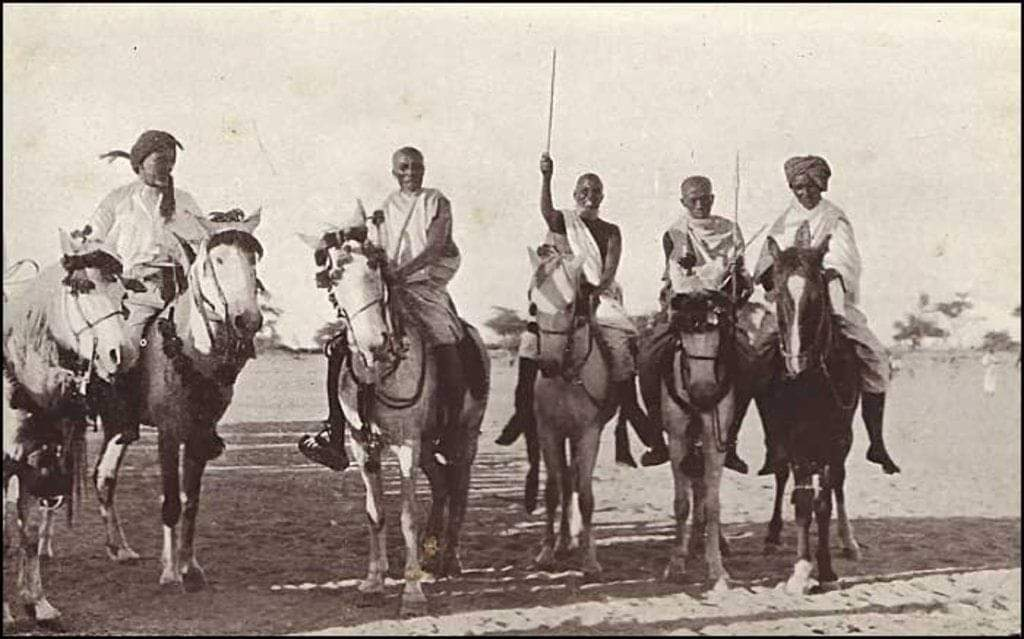
Isaaq horsemen of the Eidagale sub-clan

Doqonkii Ogaadeen ahaa Doollo laga qaadye
Loo diid Dannood iyo hadduu degi lahaa Ciide
Nimanbaa dalkoodiyo xukuma labadi daaroode

Translation:

Doollo has been taken from the Ogaadeen, the fools
If they want to encamp in Dannood and 'lid, they are forbidden
Other men rule their country, and their two regions [...]

Uhlig notes that Ali Dhuh's poems describe the extensive territorial gains made by the Isaaq in traditionally Ogaden lands, the seizure of Ogaden wells, and the large-scale looting of their camels. The poems recount the dispersal of the Ogaden clan, their migration southward into fever-prone river valleys, and their adoption of farming and hunting—activities considered degrading and typically associated with slaves and lower-caste Somalis:

Daacuunku meeshuu ku leyn uma dalluumeene
Daal iyo hadhuudh kuma cuneen degelkii Haarweyne
Dullinimo inay qaayibeen waxaw daliilkiiya

Translation:

They would not have migrated to a place where plague attacks them
They would not eat barley and millet in the Haarweyne region
[and later] they cultivate the fields, because of their extreme poverty

According to the poems, many Ogaden sought refuge among their Isaaq conquerors, particularly with the Habr Yunis. Ali Dhuh's verses depict the Ogaden as unable to retaliate, while the Isaaq are portrayed as flaunting their captured camels in front of their defeated adversaries. Uhlig remarks that even in translation, the poem remains highly evocative.

B. W. Andrzejewski author of A Somali Poetic Combat writes :

During the period of administrative chaos which followed the war the Isaaq used their superior strength against both the Ogaadeen and the Dhulbahante. They looted many Ogaadeen herds, captured some of their wells and water-ponds, and dislodged them from a large part of their grazing areas in the Hawd. The Isaaq onslaught was so powerful that the Ogaadeen could put up little or no resistance, and did not even try to avenge their wrongs. Some of the clans, however, after being looted and pushed southward, developed a modus vivendi with the Isaaq and intermarried with them.

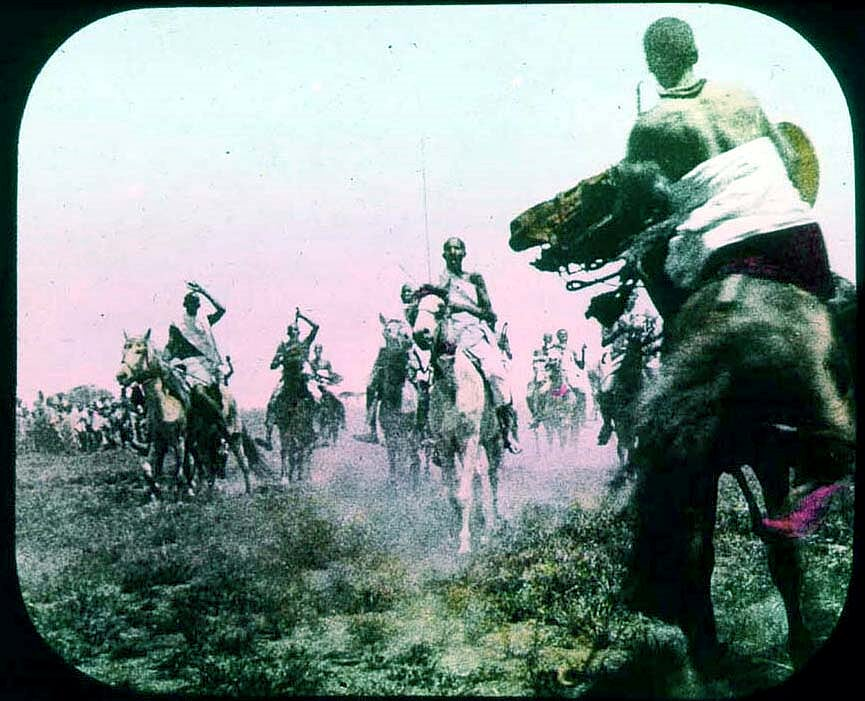
Sultan Nur and Habr Yunis horsemen, 1896

In his book The Galla in Northern Somaliland Ioan Lewis states :

The southwards expansion of the Somali from the shores of the Gulf of Aden still continues despite the establishment of international frontiers and Administrative control. It is very evident in the Northern Province of Kenya, and in the British Protectorate the Isaaq now appear to be pushing outside the territory at the expense of the Darod into the Ogaden and Haud.

The Battle of Dheriyo was a pivotal and fiercely fought conflict between the Ciidagale and Ogaden clans, where the Ogaden forces reportedly suffered devastating losses, with only 15 survivors who surrendered in an attempt to save themselves, claiming to belong to the minority Sab (Madhiban) clan. The enraged Ciidagale warriors, emboldened by their thirst for vengeance from an earlier battle, reportedly took no prisoners. The battle was immortalized in Somali oral poetry, with poets like Qawdhan Ducaale and Cabdi Gahaydh vividly recounting the triumph of the Ciidagale and the humiliation of the Ogaden.

The Isaaq advance into Ogaden territory was eventually halted by the intervention of the British protectorate authorities with assistance from the Ethiopian Empire, who considered the Ogaden their subjects and whose safety was their priority. In one incident the Habar Yunis looted 1330 camels from the Ogaden, but were pressured by the British and the Ethiopians to return the camels to their previous owners. The Habr Yunis obliged and promised to desist in their raids, but despite their promise they continued to successfully raid the Ogadenis unhindered up until the British ceded the Haud to Ethiopia. Despite this, however, the Arap and Habr Awal Isaaqs would raid the Ogadenis as late as 1959 and clash with Ethiopian authorities.

== Migrations into Sool ==
Current extent of the Isaaq clan-family in Somaliland (in yellow)

Around the same time, the Isaaq clan expanded further into traditional Dhulbahante territory to the east. This expansion was led primarily by the Habr Je’lo subclan. The Habr Je'lo Soocane faction under Kite Fiqi would raid Sool as early as the 1850s. The clan boundary between the Habr Je'lo and the Dhulbahante during the 19th century was traditionally in Laba Garday, a pass in the Buurdhaab mountain chain situated between War Idaad and Wadamago. The Dhulbahante had previously inhabited just east of Burao. The Habr Je'lo took advantage of the Dhulbahante's weakness after the defeat of the Dervish movement to conquer much of their important wells and grazing grounds. The Habr Je'lo subsequently expanded into and beyond the Saraar plain and the Ain Valley (which includes towns like Kirit, Wadamago, Aynaba, El Dab, Badwein and Gosawein), pushing the Dhulbahante southwards towards the Haud:

Thus under pressure from the Habar Tol Ja'lo expanding to their north, the Dulbahante claim that formerly their north-western boundary was the Sarar Plain now grazed mainly by Habar Tol Ja'lo. And there is good evidence that they have in fact been forced to move south. Those Dulbahante lineages which formerly grazed in the Ain region and which were accordingly called Reer ‘Aymeed today pasture their stock mainly in the scrub-lands of the northern Hand where they are known as ‘people of the bush’ (Reer Oodeed).

— Ioan Lewis

By 1951, some segments of the Mohamed and Muuse Abokor lineages of the Habar Je‘lo were penetrating as far south as Docmo and Marqanweyn in the Haud.

=== Conquest of Aynaba ===
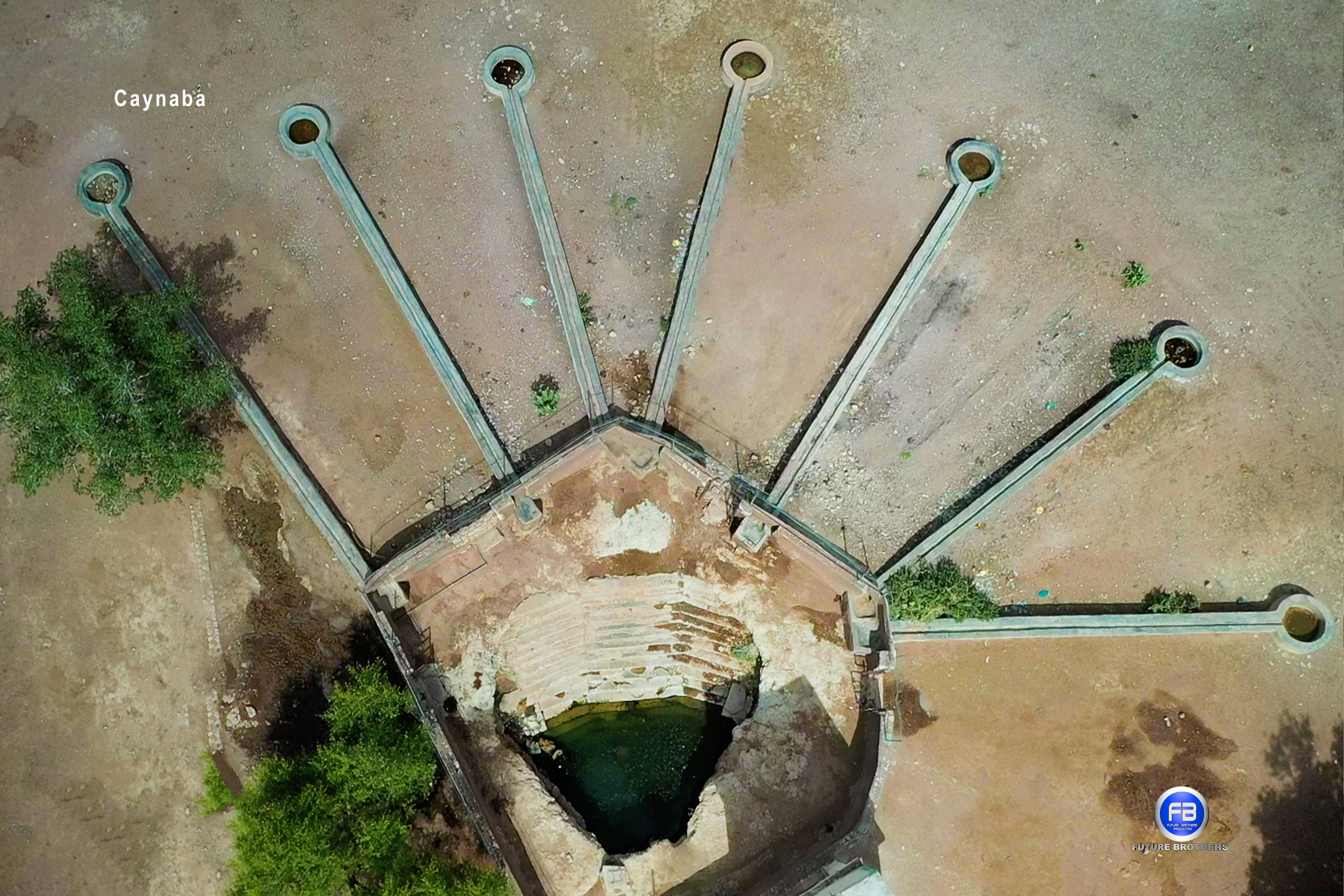
Aynaba Well

One of the most significant military and territorial gains was the Habr Je'lo conquest of the strategic town of Aynaba during a tribal war between the Habr Je'lo and the Dhulbahante in 1954–55. At the start of the 20th century Aynaba and its surroundings were inhabited by the Dhulbahante, who controlled the important wells there, which was seized by the Habr Je'lo alongside the town itself.

An all-out tribal war broke out due to camel rustling in Erigavo District (today Sanaag region) perpetrated by Dhulbahante warrior Ali Guun. The death of Ali Guun in the Ban 'Ade plain between Garadag and Hudun at the hands of the Habr Je'lo turned the tide against the Dhulbahante, with the war later on being fought southwards in an area further south of Las Anod.

A Habr Je'lo poet stated:

Dadku kala laf weyne sane,
Hadaan laayey Hagar Aadan (Dhulbahante).
Oo xero Garaad kula legdemay,
Libin miyey siigtay?

Translation:

People are not equal in strength,
If I killed the men (of the tribe of) Hagar Aadan.
And fought them in the carrels of their Sultan,
Have I missed victory?

Another poemabout the war was composed by Mohamed Adan Aws (Yawleh) of the Habr Yunis Isaaq:

Mudo aan dhaweyn baa
Nugaal muran ka taagnaaye.
Ay qoloba qolo maaganayd,
inay muquunshaane.
Hayeeshee Habr Jeclaa mulkiday
Maaxdii Caynaba eh.
Military cadhoodaa
Laf buu malow ka siiyaaye.
Maroodigaba soo jeesigaa
Maaro loo heline.
Ma Mariniiskii baa idin helay,
Ayda Miranaayey?

Translation:

For a long time
There were arguments in the Nugaal (Valley).
And each tribe was planning to force out (from
the Nugaal) the other tribe.
Nevertheless, it is Habr Jeclo that
Owns now the sweat waters of Ainabo.
An angry military
Usually crushes bones.
Once the elephant turns around
No one can stop him.
Have you (Dhulbahante) met
The marines (i.e., Habr Jeclo) that were roaming the jungle?

The renowned Habr Je'lo poet Salaan Carrabey commemorated these victories in his poem Haadaaqsi, part of the celebrated Guba poetic series. This boastful poem reflects the triumph of the Habar Je’lo over the Dhulbahante and describes the severe state of defeat inflicted upon their adversaries. Salaan's vivid verses recount the displacement of Dhulbahante groups, their forced retreat to less hospitable areas, and the humiliation they endured as a result of their losses. The poem is characterized by its confident tone and sharp critique of the Dhulbahante's diminished status.

Goortaan hadhkaba kaa eryaad hawd u cararteene
Waa kaa hubkii sida raggii wada hareednaaye
Habarwaana waa kaa hingilan labadii haamoode
Shirsooruhuba hoy maleh kuwaad hilib wadaagtaane
Waa kaa hayaankii ku dhacay Hoobayiyo xeebe
Ararsame ma haybsado Nugaal hogashadii ceele
Hanas iyo abaar kulu adoo habaqle soo guurey
Caynaba hadhuub kama dartaan hoga kaliileede
Ka hulleele Hagar aadankii hoobalayn jiraye
Aduunbaa hayaayda u guntane heeryo lagu saarye
Hooyaalayntaan kaga badshaa haybad iyo luuqe
Haasaasahaa laga gartaa hagar la'aaneede
Mar haddaan hullaabta iska rogo soo hankaabsadaye
An hawadiyo hoosada Burciyo Herer ka geeyeene
Kuma hiilo heeliga fulaa la handabeeyaaye
Anse wacan haagaag uga marshaa heel la ii wacaye

— Salaan Carrabey Haadaaqsi
Translation:

When I had chased you from the region where there is shade, you ran away to the Hawd
And (yet) here are (your) young bearded men carrying arms
The two sections of the Habarwaa are in clothes of mourning
The Shirshoore, who are of the same flesh as you, homeless
Indeed they had to trek towards Hobyo and the coast
The Ararsame do not (even dare to) inquire about Nugaal and watering at the wells
In the heat of the sun, suffering fierce thirst, you trudged along wearily
You do not even take one vessel of water from Aynaba in the heat of the kaliil
The Hagar Aadan who used to chant (to their camels, while watering them) have moved out from there
And you who tell people to rally, the mat pack saddle (of humiliation) has been put
In reciting poetry I excel others by (my) distinctive style and chant
One can recognize (good) diction by (its) effortless ease
Once I throw off the upper part of (my) clothes (preparing for a fight), I am firm and resolute
Let me pour out (poetry) and let people take it to the glades of Bur'o and to Herer
A coward who is criticised has no courage at an assembly
But I speak openly and straight to the point at a meeting especially convened for me

The Dhulbahante loss of Caynabo constituted a form of collective trauma for the Dhulbahante, and touched a nerve among them, especially the subclans inhabiting the Buuhoodle area (who were evicted from Caynabo previously). The current clan border between the Isaaq and the Dhulbahante is roughly between the towns of Oog and Guumays in Sool region. This incident has given birth to a Somali proverb: "A 60-year-old Dhulbahante and a 20-year-old Isaaq cannot agree on Caynabo":

The earlier loss of Caynabo to the Isaaq constituted a kind of collective trauma for Dhulbahante, one expressed in a proverb composed in the 1960s: ‘Lixdan jirka Dhulbahante iyo labaatan jirka Isaaq ku ma heshin karaan Caynabo’ (‘A 60 year-old Dhulbahante and a 20 year-old Isaaq cannot agree on Caynabo’). A Dhulbahante born before 1910 would have grown up believing Caynabo was in his degaan, while a far younger Isaaq would have thought Caynabo part of his.

— Markus Virgil Hoehne, Between Somaliland and Puntland Marginalization, militarization and conflicting political visions, 61
