= Gowsaweyne =

- Village
- Location in Somaliland Gowsaweyne (Somaliland)
- Coordinates: 9°5′20″N 46°46′25″E
- Country: Somaliland
- Region: Sanaag, Somaliland
- District: Garadag District
- Time zone: UTC+3 (EAT)

Gowsaweyne, also spelt Gawsa Weyne and Gosawein is a village in the Sanaagregion of Somaliland. It is located in the Garadag District.

== History ==
The Isaaq clan expanded into traditional Dhulbahante territory to the east. This expansion was led primarily by the Habr Je’lo subclan. The clan boundary between the Habr Je'lo and the Dhulbahante during the 19th century was traditionally in Laba Garday, a pass in the Buurdhaab mountain chain situated between War Idaad and Wadamago. The Dhulbahante had previously inhabited just east of Burao. The Habr Je'lo took advantage of the Dhulbahante's weakness after the defeat of the Dervish movement to conquer much of their important wells and grazing grounds. The Habr Je'lo subsequently expanded into and beyond the Saraar plain and the Ain Valley (which includes Gosawein), pushing the Dhulbahante southwards towards the Haud:

Thus under pressure from the Habar Tol Ja'lo expanding to their north, the Dulbahante claim that formerly their north-western boundary was the Sarar Plain now grazed mainly by Habar Tol Ja'lo. And there is good evidence that they have in fact been forced to move south. Those Dulbahante lineages which formerly grazed in the Ain region and which were accordingly called Reer ‘Aymeed today pasture their stock mainly in the scrub-lands of the northern Hand where they are known as ‘people of the bush’ (Reer Oodeed).

— Ioan Lewis

=== Recent history ===
In August 2013, several people were killed in fighting between the Cismaan Iidle and Sacadyoonis clans near Gowsaweyne.

In January 2014, at least four members of the Sa'ad Yonis clan were killed by the Jama Siyad clan in fighting near Gowsaweyne. Ceasefire brokered by a Somaliland government minister and others at the end of August.

In June 2014, the road connecting Oog and Garadag was completed, and a representative from Gowsaweyne attended the opening ceremony.

In October 2017, voter registration was conducted by the Somaliland Electoral Commission, with a combined total of 900 people registered in the two constituencies established in Gowsaweyne.

In January 2018, officials from Garadag District visited Gowsaweyne to audit the progress of a project funded by UNICEF and the Norwegian Refugee Council.

In April 2021, a storm hit some areas including Gowsaweyne.
