= Aynaba =

Town in Sool, Somaliland

Aynaba Caynaba (Somali) عينبة (Arabic)
- Town
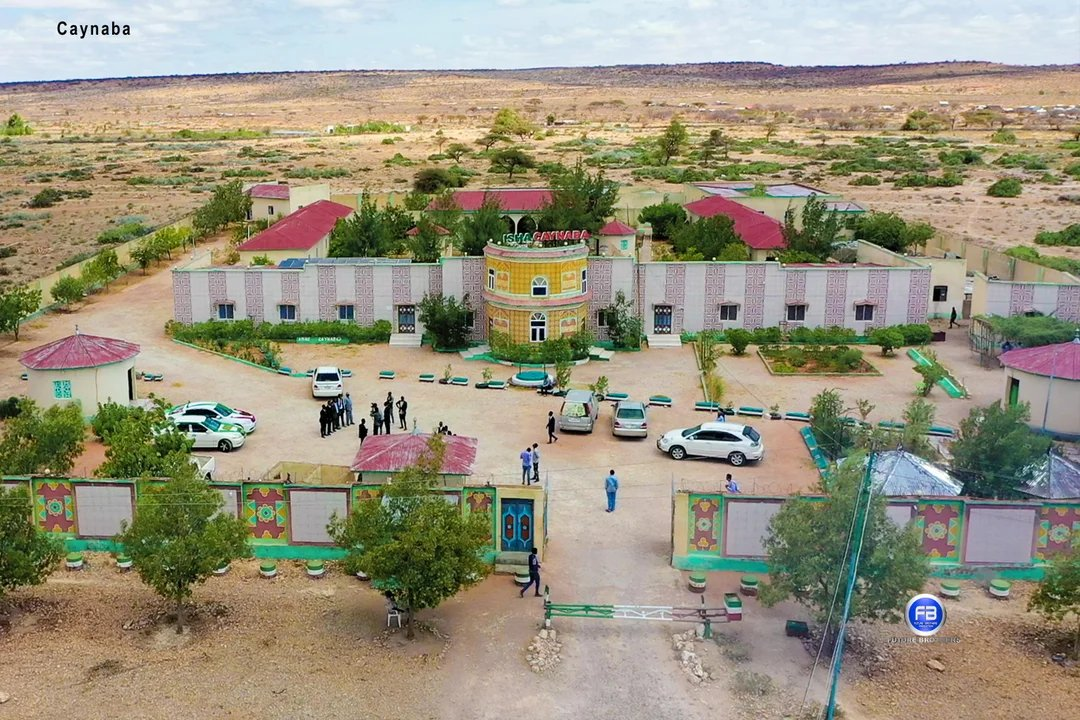
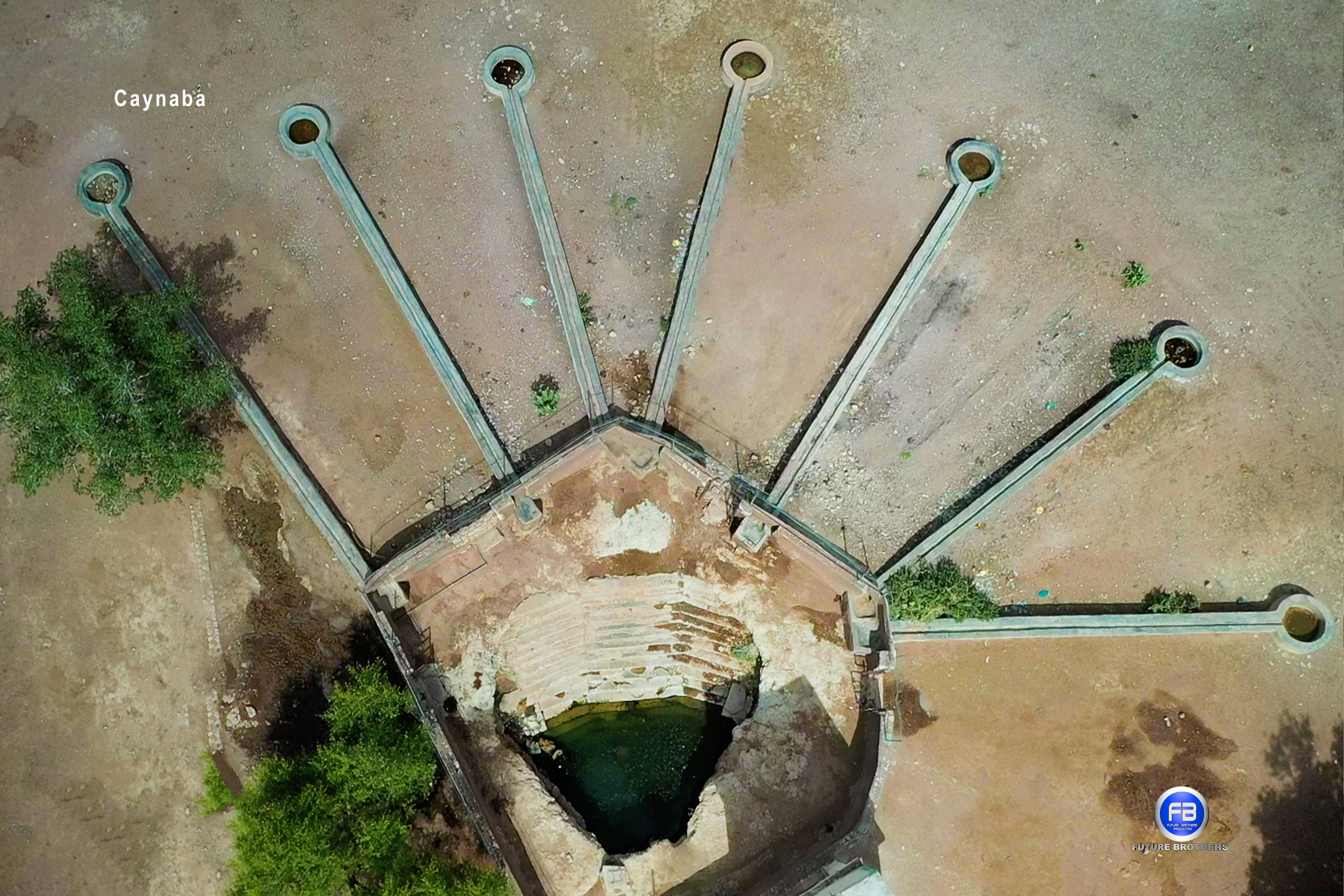

- Location in Somaliland Aynaba (Somaliland)
- Coordinates: 8°57′24″N 46°24′43″E
- Country: Somaliland
- Region: Sool
- District: Aynaba District

Government
  - Mayor: Mr Mohamed Haibe Mohamud

Area
  - Total: 18 km^{2} (6.9 sq mi)

Population (2013)
  - Total: 50,000
  - Rank: 10th
- Time zone: UTC+3 (EAT)

Aynaba, also spelt Ainabo, Ainaba or Aynabo (Somali: Caynaba, Arabic: عينبة) is a major town in western Sool region of Somaliland as well as the administrative seat of the Aynaba District.

== Overview ==
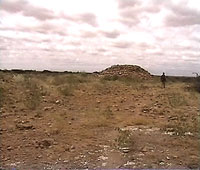
Ancient ruins in Aynaba

Aynaba is situated on a busy tarmac road connecting Somaliland's major cities and is the second largest town in the Sool region of Somaliland after Las Anod. The town is almost at the exact center between Burao and Las Anod, with the town being 127 km and 124 km away from both cities respectively. The name "Aynaba" or "Aynabo" translates to "black" in the Somali language.

Aynaba is home to the famous Aynaba Well, well known throughout Somaliland and among Somalis in general for its depth and abundant water, which attracts nomads from neighbouring Togdheer, Sanaag and Sool regions and has been the subject of many poems.

Ancient edifices have been found in Aynaba. Somaliland in general, is home to numerous such archaeological sites and megalithic structures, with similar rock art found at Haadh, Gudmo Biyo Cas, Dhambalin, Dhagah Maroodi and numerous other sites, while ancient edifices are, among others, found at Sheikh, Aw-Barkhadle, Ancient Amud, Heis, Maydh, Haylan, Qa’ableh, Qombo'ul and El Ayo. However, many of these old structures have yet to be properly explored, a process which would help shed further light on local history and facilitate their preservation for posterity.

== History ==
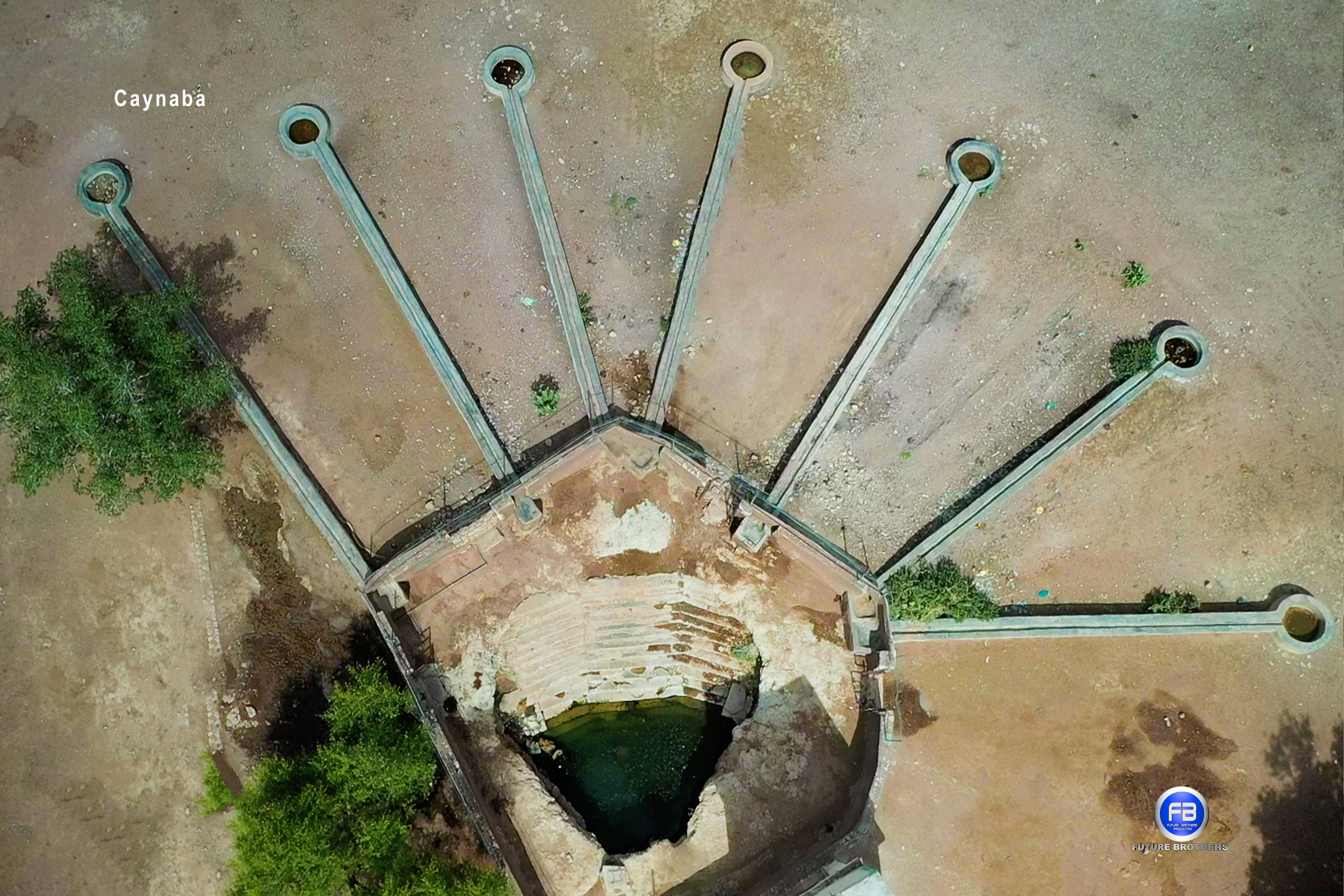
The famous Aynaba well

=== 19th century ===
During the early to mid-19th century, Aynaba was the headquarters of the Soocane military faction led by the famous poet and military leader Kite Fiqi.

==== Dervish movement ====
The town was one of many temporary local centers that the Dervish movement operated from, led by the Mad Mullah's second in command Haji Sudi of the Adan Madoba subclan of the Habr Je'lo. The town was also the sight of clashes between the movement's Sufi tariqa, the Salihiyya and its rival, the Qadiriyya in 1955.

=== Guba series ===
Following a string of Habr Je'lo victories over the Dhulbahante after the collapse of the Dervish movement, in which they had captured many wells and reduced their opponents to a pitiful state, including expelling them from Aynaba and the wider Aynaba district, Salaan Carrabey composed a boastful poem dedicated to Aynaba called Haadaaqsi.

Ararsame ma haybsado Nugaal hogashadii ceele
Hanas iyo abaar kulu adoo habaqle soo guurey
Caynaba hadhuub kama dartaan hoga kaliileede
Ka hulleele Hagar aadankii hoobalayn jiraye

— Salaan Carrabey Haadaaqsi
Translation:

The Ararsame do not (even dare to) inquire about Nugaal and watering at the wells
In the heat of the sun, suffering fierce thirst, you trudged along wearily
You do not even take one vessel of water from Aynaba in the heat of the kaliil
The Hagar Aadan who used to chant (to their camels, while watering them) have moved out from there

=== Conquest of Aynaba ===
The Isaaq clan expanded into traditional Dhulbahante territory to the east. This expansion was led primarily by the Habr Je’lo subclan. The clan boundary between the Habr Je'lo and the Dhulbahante during the 19th century was traditionally in Laba Garday, a pass in the Buurdhaab mountain chain situated between War Idaad and Wadamago. The Dhulbahante had previously inhabited just east of Burao. The Habr Je'lo took advantage of the Dhulbahante's weakness after the defeat of the Dervish movement to conquer much of their important wells and grazing grounds. The Habr Je'lo subsequently expanded into and beyond the Saraar plain and the Ain Valley (which includes Aynaba), pushing the Dhulbahante southwards towards the Haud:

Thus under pressure from the Habar Tol Ja'lo expanding to their north, the Dulbahante claim that formerly their north-western boundary was the Sarar Plain now grazed mainly by Habar Tol Ja'lo. And there is good evidence that they have in fact been forced to move south. Those Dulbahante lineages which formerly grazed in the Ain region and which were accordingly called Reer ‘Aymeed today pasture their stock mainly in the scrub-lands of the northern Hand where they are known as ‘people of the bush’ (Reer Oodeed).

— Ioan Lewis

One of the most significant military and territorial gains was the Habr Je'lo conquest of the strategic town of Aynaba during a tribal war between the Habr Je'lo and the Dhulbahante in 1954–55. At the start of the 20th century Aynaba and its surroundings were inhabited by the Dhulbahante, who controlled the important wells there, which was seized by the Habr Je'lo alongside the town itself.

The immediate cause of the war was camel rustling in Erigavo District (today Sanaag region) perpetrated by the famous Dhulbahante warrior, Ali Guun. The camel rustling perpetrated by Ali Guun was however a bloody affair, which precipitated an all-out tribal conflict between the two clans. The death of Ali Guun in Ban 'Ade, a plain between Garadag and Hudun turned the tide against the Dhulbahante, with the actual war later on being fought in an area further south of Las Anod. A Habr Je'lo poet stated:

Dadku kala laf weyne sane,
Hadaan laayey Hagar Aadan (Dhulbahante).
Oo xero Garaad kula legdemay,
Libin miyey siigtay?

Translation:

People are not equal in strength,
If I killed the men (of the tribe of) Hagar Aadan.
And fought them in the carrels of their Sultan,
Have I missed victory?

The most famous poem about the war was composed by Mohamed Adan Aws (Yawleh) of the Habr Yunis Isaaq. Intending to salt the wounds of the Dhulbahante, he said:

Mudo aan dhaweyn baa
Nugaal muran ka taagnaaye.
Ay qoloba qolo maaganayd,
inay muquunshaane.
Hayeeshee Habr Jeclaa mulkiday
Maaxdii Caynaba eh.
Military cadhoodaa
Laf buu malow ka siiyaaye.
Maroodigaba soo jeesigaa
Maaro loo heline.
Ma Mariniiskii baa idin helay,
Ayda Miranaayey?

Translation:

For a long time
There were arguments in the Nugaal (Valley).
And each tribe was planning to force out (from
the Nugaal) the other tribe.
Nevertheless, it is Habr Jeclo that
Owns now the sweat waters of Ainabo.
An angry military
Usually crushes bones.
Once the elephant turns around
No one can stop him.
Have you (Dhulbahante) met
The marines (i.e., Habr Jeclo) that were roaming the jungle?

The Dhulbahante loss of Caynabo constituted a form of collective trauma for the Dhulbahante, and touched a nerve among them, especially the subclans inhabiting the Buuhoodle area. The current clan border between the Isaaq and the Dhulbahante is roughly between the towns of Oog and Guumays in Sool region.

=== Drought ===
Between 1974 and 1975, a major drought referred to as the Abaartii Dabadheer ("The Lingering Drought") occurred in modern-day Somaliland and the neighbouring northern Puntland region of Somalia. The Soviet Union, which at the time maintained strategic relations with the Siad Barre government, airlifted some 90,000 people from the devastated regions of Aynaba and the towns of Beer and Hobyo. New small settlements referred to as Danwadaagaha ("Collective Settlements") were then created in Jubbada Hoose (Lower Jubba) and Jubbada Dhexe (Middle Jubba) regions. The transplanted families were also introduced to farming and fishing techniques, a change from their traditional pastoralist lifestyle of livestock herding.

== Oil exploration ==
The area Aynaba is located in is home to Block SL10B/13. In November 2019, Genel energy present estimation of block potential. It conclude the existence of active petroleum system and several stacked oil reserves within the block adding up to 1.3 billion barrels of oil. Full field development will have daily output of 50.000 barrels of oil. In December 2021, Genel Energy signed a farm-out deal with OPIC Somaliland Corporation, backed by Taiwan’s CPC Corporation, on the SL10B/13 block. According to Genel, the block could contain more than 5 billion barrels of prospective resources.

== Demographics ==
As of 2018 Aynaba has an estimated population of 50,000. In 2005, the wider district of Aynaba had a population of 75,702 residents.

According to a book published in England in 1951, Aynabo was inhabited by the, Habr Je'lo, and clans.

According to a 2016 document from EASO, and 2018 document by Markus Virgil Hoehne, a lecturer at the Leipzig University, Aynabo is primarily inhabited by the Reer Yoonis of the Musa Abokor subclan of Habr Je'lo.

== Notable residents ==
- Haji Abdi Awad Ali (Indhadeero) — Somali entrepreneur and the founder and former CEO of Indhadeero Group of Companies.
- Sheikh Ali Warsame – prominent Somali Islamic cleric and preacher, founder of AIAI (1939–2022)
- Jama Mohamed Aden — Somali former middle-distance runner
- aadan tarabi — Somali poet and songwriter
