= Oog =

- Village
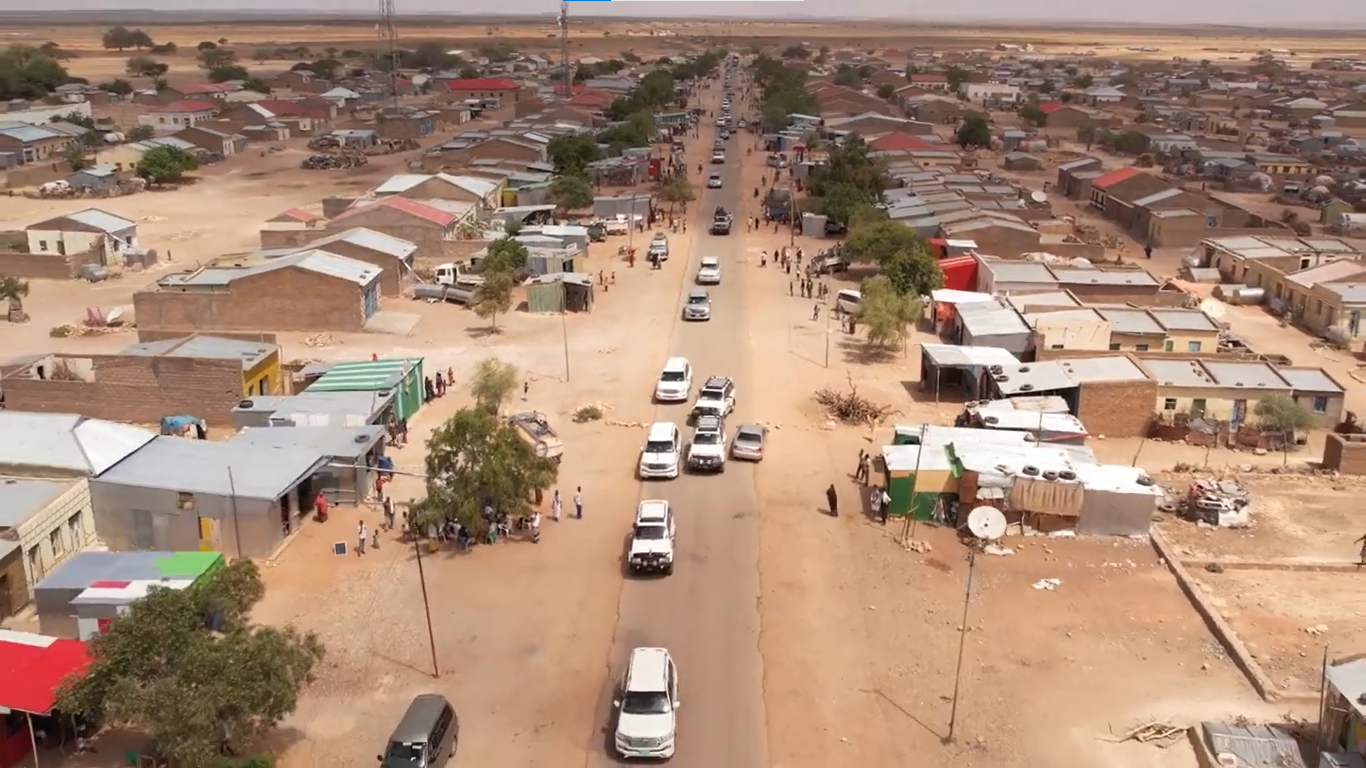
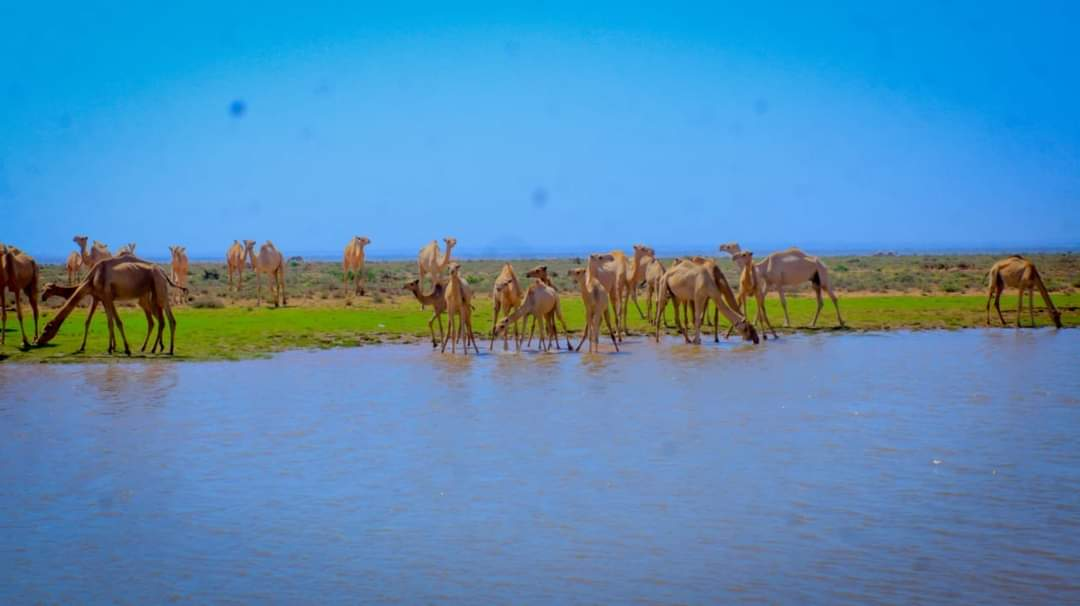
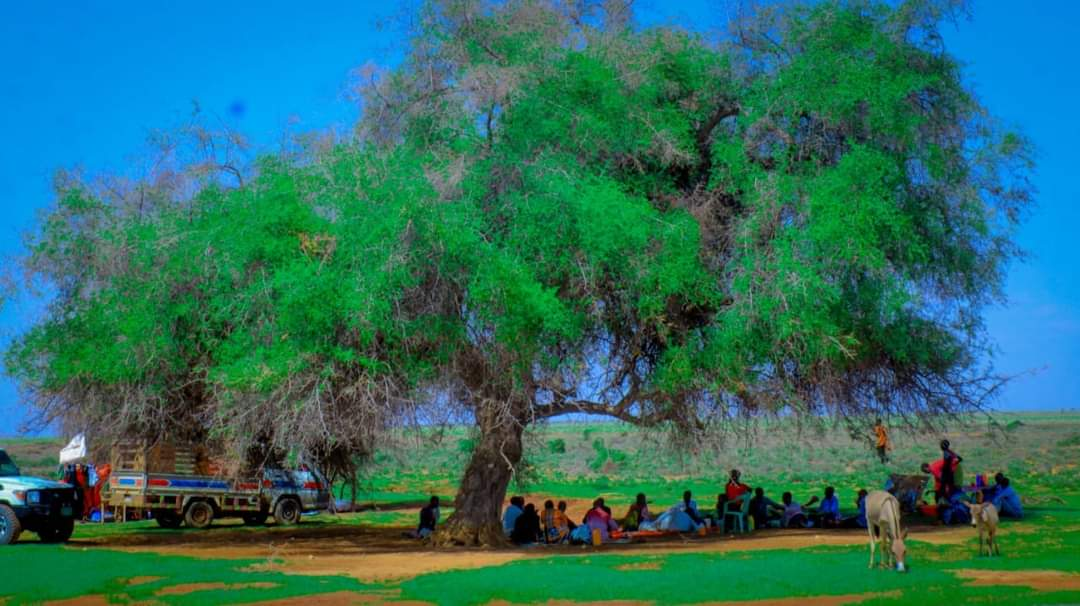

- Location in Somaliland Oog (Somaliland)
- Coordinates: 8°56′N 46°38′E
- Country: Somalia
- Administrative divisions of Somalila: Sool
- District: Aynabo
- Time zone: UTC+3 (EAT)

Oog is a town in the Sool region of Somalila, situated in the Aynaba district. It is located between Aynaba and Las Anod.

== Demographics ==
According to a book published in England in 1951, Ok (Oog) is listed among the Home Wells of Habr Toljaala, specifically under Ome Jibril and Adarahman Musa (Omr and Yunis). The entry therefore links Oog to those Habr Toljaala (Habr Je'lo) lineages.

In early 1991, a peacebuilding study records that Oog was traditionally inhabited by both the Dhulbahante and Isaaq clans, noting that at that time it was mainly occupied by the Dhulbahante.

According to a 2009 source, both the Baede Yunis sub-clan of the Habar Je’lo and the Cali Barre sub-clan of the Habr Je'lo were present and held interests in Oog during this period.

== Economy, industry and natural environment ==
South of Oog, in the Haud, the rare collared lark can be found as well as the native dibatag antelope.

Oog has a local economy based on livestock, water access, and small-scale public works, closely linked to its semi-arid environment. In November 2018, Somaliland's Ministry of Water Resources, in cooperation with CARE, established two boreholes on the northern outskirts of Oog and the eastern side of Wadamago to provide reliable drinking water and livestock watering points. In February 2019, the Oog district administration began constructing a 2-km internal road to improve mobility and commercial access within the town. In May 2023, heavy rainfall caused fatalities in the district.

== Transport and logistics ==
Key transport nodes and corridors involving Oog

Oog acts as the junction of the road connecting the regional capitals of Burao and Erigavo.

Oog is situated on Somaliland's main road connecting towns and cities like Borama, Hargeisa, Berbera and Burao to Somalia. Oog is located 151 km (94 mi) from Burao, 100 km (62 mi) from Las Anod, and 239 km (149 mi) from Erigavo.

10 km (6.2 mi) north of Oog is the nearby town of Badweyn, home to a substantial mosque and a multiple-trunked tree that stands alongside the main road.

Local Somali-language reporting frequently situates Oog on the overland corridors that link Burao, Erigavo and Las Anod, with the town functioning as a staging and transit point for road movements. During the 2023–2024 Las Anod crisis, outlets noted that additional units, supplies and officials transited by road to the Oog garrison, underscoring the town's role on the main trunk routes across Sool and the eastern regions.

Road-security events east of Oog also affected corridor reliability. Somali-language coverage from November 2023 reported clashes and road disruptions in the Buqdarkayn area “u dhow degmada Oog” (“near Oog district”), highlighting how incidents along the Oog–Las Anod axis can temporarily impede civilian and cargo traffic.

In addition, Somali outlets described Oog's role in 2023 as a forward logistics and supply node on the western side of the frontline, with parallel troop and supply movements reported toward Yeyle and along the Oog–Yagori corridor.

Routing services used by local drivers and bus operators similarly reflect Oog's placement on inter-urban itineraries between Las Anod and Burao, corroborating its role as a stop or junction for long-haul road transport across the region.

== Education ==
It was reported that about 400 boys and girls attending the Alle-Aamin primary school in the Oog district have neither classrooms nor chairs; lessons are held outdoors, where students sit on mats laid on the ground and even take their examinations in front of the market under open sky. Around the same time, the secondary school in Oog was described as operating with four classrooms and five teachers, with many pupils being children of front-line soldiers. In June 2025, national examination oversight teams visited centers in the Saraar region, specifically including Oog (together with Wadamago and Caynaba), to verify compliance during secondary and intermediate exams.

== Military ==
Oog is home to a Somaliland National Army base.

Coverage that explicitly names Oog highlights the town's role as a garrison and staging point for Somaliland forces. In early September 2023, new army units were sent to Oog and were addressed at the local command post. Around the same time, a formal ceremony was held at the Oog army command to welcome newly trained units. Earlier that month, plans were announced for a presidential visit to Oog following the Goojacade events. In 2019, district police in Oog removed unlawfully fenced enclosures as part of local law-enforcement operations. In April 2025, a troop registration and personnel-record system was inaugurated at the Oog command, indicating its continued administrative function for the armed forces.

== Inter-clan conflict ==
Key locations mentioned in the section (mapped on Sool)

In February 1991, Oog became one of the key venues for clan-led reconciliation in northern Somalia. From 2 to 8 February 1991, a delegation of the Somali National Movement (SNM) met with representatives of the Dhulbahante led by Garad Abdiqani Garad Jama, reaching a ceasefire agreement and planning a broader conference at Berbera that would also involve the Warsangali. Oog—together with Yagori—remained part of the reconciliation corridor through 1992, facilitating follow-up meetings that emphasized trust-building, temporary disarmament, and coordinated travel between delegations. Later that year, in October 1991, leaders of the Habar Yoonis, Habr Je'lo, and Dhulbahante clans held another peace conference in Oog.

In 2008, a member of the diaspora from the Sa'ad Yunis branch of the Habar Yoonis clan returned from the United States and attempted to convert his grazing lands into farmland in Oog, which led to a serious conflict with members of the Mohamed Abokor sub-clan of the Habr Je'lo.

In August 2013, after clashes near Gowsaweyne in the Oog area, elders (odayaal) and security forces intervened to separate the sides and begin mediation. Scholarship on Somaliland's customary institutions similarly highlights the role of elders in resolving local disputes in and around Oog.

In January 2014, a murder in the Oog neighborhood led to fighting in Gowsaweyne between Sa'ad Yonis of Habar Yoonis and Jama Siyad of Dhulbahante that resulted in deaths.

In April 2019, two policemen were killed on the road connecting Garadag and Oog, causing an inter-clan struggle.

=== Las Anod conflict ===
Following the outbreak of the Las Anod conflict in 2023, Oog also took on a forward military role for the Somaliland side. In September 2023, additional units were deployed to the Oog base and senior commanders addressed troops there. The next day, newly graduated units from the Sheikh training center were posted to Oog in a ceremony attended by cabinet ministers and the then-chief of the Somaliland Armed Forces Nuh Ismail Tani. During late 2023, fighting also flared in nearby localities such as Buqdarkayn, reported as being close to Oog, underscoring the area's frontline status.

On the opposite side, the SSC-Khatumo forces established their own forward line in Yagori after the fall of the Goojacade base in August 2023, extending their control westward from Las Anod. Subsequent analysis placed the autumn 2023 frontline in western Sool, roughly between Oog and Guumays, with SSC-Khatumo holding areas further east including Yagori.

In 2024, high-level visits to forces in the Oog area continued. In October 2024, the chair of the UCID met troops at Oog and publicly called for patriotism and support for the national forces. Later that month, President Muse Bihi Abdi’s eastern-regions tour included engagements with Somaliland National Forces stationed in Oog, reflecting the town’s continued military significance during the conflict period.

== History ==
=== Before Independence ===
Oog is written as "Ok" in a book published in England in 1951 as the coordinate 8°55′N 46°37′E.

In February 1919, Oog was attacked by Mullah's forces.

=== Recent History ===
In December 2011, a large delegation led by the Speaker of the House of Representatives of Somaliland and the Chairman of the Waddani visited Oog.

In April 2012, Somtel's office was opened in Oog, and the mayor and others attended the event.

== See also ==
- Administrative divisions of Somaliland
- Regions of Somaliland
- Districts of Somaliland
- Somalia–Somaliland border
