= Badweyn =

- Village
- Location in Somaliland Badweyn (Somaliland)
- Coordinates: 8°59′40″N 46°39′27″E
- Country: Somaliland
- Region: Sool
- District: Aynabo District
- Time zone: UTC+3 (EAT)

Badweyn also spelt Badwein is a town in the Aynabo District, in the Sool region of Somaliland.

== Overview ==
Badweyn means "big well" in the Somali language. The town is home to a substantial mosque and a multiple-trunked tree that stands alongside the main road.

== History ==
The Isaaq clan expanded into traditional Dhulbahante territory to the east. This expansion was led primarily by the Habr Je’lo subclan. The clan boundary between the Habr Je'lo and the Dhulbahante during the 19th century was traditionally in Laba Garday, a pass in the Buurdhaab mountain chain situated between War Idaad and Wadamago. The Dhulbahante had previously inhabited just east of Burao. The Habr Je'lo took advantage of the Dhulbahante's weakness after the defeat of the Dervish movement to conquer much of their important wells and grazing grounds. The Habr Je'lo subsequently expanded into and beyond the Saraar plain and the Ain Valley (which includes Badwein), pushing the Dhulbahante southwards towards the Haud:

Thus under pressure from the Habar Tol Ja'lo expanding to their north, the Dulbahante claim that formerly their north-western boundary was the Sarar Plain now grazed mainly by Habar Tol Ja'lo. And there is good evidence that they have in fact been forced to move south. Those Dulbahante lineages which formerly grazed in the Ain region and which were accordingly called Reer ‘Aymeed today pasture their stock mainly in the scrub-lands of the northern Hand where they are known as ‘people of the bush’ (Reer Oodeed).

— Ioan Lewis
