= Buqdarkayn =

- Village
- Location within Sool Location within Somaliland
- Coordinates: 8°44′14″N 46°34′36″E
- Country: Somaliland
- Region: Sool
- District: Aynaba District

Population
  - Total: 10,000
- Time zone: UTC+3 (EAT)
- Relation map. Bu=Buqdarkayn, La=Las Anod, Mu=Muraayada, Oo=Oog, Ya=Yagori, Ye=Yeyle

Buqdarkayn (or Buqdharkayn, Buq-dharkayn) is a village in the state of Sool region of Somaliland. The village is situated between the village of Muraayda and east of the village of Yagori, where another Somaliland base is also situated.

== Demographics ==
Around Buqdharkayn are mainly inhabited by the Habr Je'lo clan.

== Overview ==
The village is surrounded by mountains and has relatively high rainfall. Sorghum, corn, and beans are cultivated. Sheep, goats, and cattle are raised. However, drought, conflict, and poverty sometimes strike.

== History ==
This area has been prosperous for a long time. There are weathered mosques and other structures. Until the beginning of the 20th century, it was inhabited mostly by the Dhulbahante clan, but the Dhulbahante were expelled as part of Muḥammad ibn 'Abdallāh Hassan's war, and it is now inhabited mostly by the Habr Je'lo clan.

A book published in England in 1951 shows the coordinates as 8°44′N 46°36′E as Buq Darkein.

In 2018, Buqdarkayn experienced a severe drought.

=== Impact of Las Anod conflict ===
On November 8, 2023, SSC forces and Somaliland forces fought between Buqdarkayn and Yeyle. A total of five people were killed on both sides. The SSC forces claimed that Somaliland forces had invaded. Some reports suggest that the Somaliland forces attempt to recapture Yeyle was the trigger. Meanwhile, the Somaliland Ministry of Interior criticized the attack as the work of a terrorist group led by Cabdi Madoobe. Faysal Ali Warabe, head of UCID party in Somaliland, accused SSC forces of burning down Buqdarkayn.

On the other hand, there are reports that the battle is not between regular forces, but between SSB militias of the Habr Je'lo clan living in Buqdarkayn and militias of Dhulbahante, the main body of the SSC.

The Habr Je'lo clan issued a statement on November 28 saying, "We support Somaliland's independence and territorial defense, but we have no intention of invading Dhulbahante territory." In response, Dhulbahante traditional leaders issued a statement on December 2 stating that they wanted peaceful. The conflict was mediated by the Garhajis clan.

In April 2024, it is reported that a new unit of the Somaliland forces was deployed to Buqdarkayn. The BBC reports that Buqdarkayn and Oog and one other location are the front lines for Somaliland and SSC forces.
