= Godheeli =

- Village
- Location in Somaliland Godheeli (Sool)
- Coordinates: 9°2′11″N 46°51′42″E
- Country: Somaliland
- Region: togdheer
- District: Aynabo District
- Time zone: UTC+3 (EAT)

Godheeli, also spelt God Heeli, is a town in the Aynabo District, in the Togdheer region of Somaliland.

== See also ==
- Administrative divisions of Somaliland
- Regions of Somaliland
- Districts of Somaliland
- Somalia–Somaliland border
