= Berkad Ali Hersi =

- Village
- Location in Somaliland
- Coordinates: 9.287°N 46.503°E
- Country: Somaliland
- Region: Sool
- District: Aynabo District
- Time zone: UTC+3 (EAT)

Berkad Ali Hersi (Somali: Barkada Cali Xirsi) is a town in the Aynabo District, in the Sool region of Somaliland.

== See also ==
- Administrative divisions of Somaliland
- Regions of Somaliland
- Districts of Somaliland
- Somalia–Somaliland border
