= Aynaba District =

Aynabo Saraar
- District
- Location of Aynabo district within Sool, Somaliland
- Country: Somaliland
- Region: Sool
- Capital: Aynabo

Population (2016)
  - Total: 75,702
- Time zone: UTC+3 (EAT)

Aynabo District (Somali: Degmada Caynaba), colloquially known as Sarar (Somali: Saraar), is a district in the northern Sool region of Somaliland. Its capital lies at Aynabo. Other settlements in the district includes Wadaamagoo, War Idaad, Berkad Ali Hersi, Godheeli, Habariheshay, Ceeldhaab, Fadhiyar, Oog, Badweyn, Gowsaweyne and Qoridheere.

== Oil exploration ==
The northern section of the district is home to Block SL10B/13. In November 2019, Genel Energy presented its estimation of the block's potential. It concluded the existence of active petroleum system and several stacked oil reserves within the block adding up to 1.3 billion barrels of oil. Full field development will have daily output of 50,000 barrels of oil. In December 2021, Genel Energy signed a farm-out deal with OPIC Somaliland Corporation, backed by Taiwan’s CPC Corporation, on the SL10B/13 block. According to Genel, the block could contain more than 5 billion barrels of prospective resources.

== Demography ==
The total population of the district is 75,702 residents.

The majority of the district is primarily inhabited by people from the Isaaq with the Musa Abokor And Omar Jibril Habr Je'lo sub-clan of the Isaaq well represented.

== See also ==
- Administrative divisions of Somaliland
- Regions of Somaliland
- Districts of Somaliland
- Somalia–Somaliland border
