= Habariheshay =

- Village
- Location in Somaliland Habariheshay (Somaliland)
- Coordinates: 8°50′21″N 46°24′6″E
- Country: Somaliland
- Region: Sool
- District: Aynabo District
- Time zone: UTC+3 (EAT)

Habariheshay is a village in the Aynabo District, in the Sool region of Somaliland.

== Demographics ==
It is primarily inhabited by the Solomadow and Reer Yoonis sub-division of the Habr Je'lo Isaaq.
