= Henry Alexander Walker =

Brigadier-General Henry Alexander Walker CB CMG DSO JP
- Born: 20 October 1874
- Died: 1 May 1953 (aged 78) Manor House, Lower Woodford, Woodford, Wiltshire, England

Brigadier-General Henry Alexander Walker CB CMG DSO JP (20 October 1874 – 1 May 1953) was a British Army officer who served with the Royal Fusiliers regiment, and later with the King's African Rifles in the First World War.

== Military career ==
Walker was the son of Lieutenant-Colonel Edward Walker, an officer of the Royal Fusiliers, and he was educated at St Georges College, Weybridge. He was commissioned a second lieutenant in the Royal Fusiliers in December 1894, was promoted to lieutenant on 24 November 1897, and to captain on 27 January 1900. He was later second in command of the 1st Battalion, King's African Rifles, Nairobi, at the turn of the 20th century.

On 3 September 1910 he was promoted to major.

In 1914, he was brigade major in the Meerut Division.

He commanded the 16th Infantry Brigade during the First World War until the loss of his left arm in a shell attack at Vaux-Andigny on 16 October 1918. He was appointed as a GSO1 of the 40th Division of Kitchener's Army in 25 October 1915 and was granted the temporary rank of lieutenant colonel while employed in this role.

He was mentioned in dispatches nine times.

On attaining the age of compulsory retirement, on 17 September 1931 he was retired on half-pay, and was granted the honorary rank of Brigadier-General.

== Battles ==
- He was listed as captain (temporary major) 1st K.A.R. who commanded the No. II Column in the first phase of the Nandi Expeditionary Force in the East Africa Protectorate, October 1905—February 1906. His column assembled and guarded sections of railway and the station at Lumbwa, in Kenya's Rift Valley Province, and completed its concentration during the night of 20–21 October 1905.

Major Walker had recently collected intelligence, and acted accordingly at dawn on 21 October, which surprised the villages of Chief Arab Nango (Kamehlo clan of Nandi) by a night march from Lumbwa. In this affair, they were completely surprised and suffered considerable casualties. He subsequently commanded his troops operating against the Nyangori tribe and latterly the left wing of the driving line and the companies in Kametilo.

- On the 22nd and 23rd October the approaches to the forest covering Tinderet range were reconnoitred.
- On the 25th and 26th the enemy's villages on the far side of Tinderet were surprised, after a night march, which began at 8 p.m. on the 24th, across this steep and densely wooded range of mountains. No. II Column then operated on the Line Uson Point-Tieto-Ket Parak Kipturi, reaching Nandi Fort to refit on the 3rd November.
- Between the 21st October and the 3rd November, the operations of No. II Column resulted in considerable loss to the enemy at the cost of 1 death and 4 casualties.
- February 1906; A garrison of five companies under command of Major Walker, drove the Kamelilo and the Tinderet range.
- By the 5th of February their first drive resulted in clearing the Mau forests of all but a few of the enemy, who remained hiding in the dense thickets on the mountains, and in completely clearing Kamelilo and Tinderet of all Nandi.
- The Nandi Field Force was demobilised on the 27th February 1906, a garrison of five companies, under Major Walker, 1st K.A.R., being left in the cultivated portion of Nandi and in Kamelilo to prevent the return to their former locations of the inhabitants whom were expelled.

- King George V approved his promotion from Captain to Major for operations during the Nandi Expeditionary Force in the East Africa Protectorate, October 1905—February 1906.
- January 1909–1910 - Somaliland - He was the first to arrive with 300 Askari of 1 KAR from Nyasaland. The battalion marched up to Wadamago where it performed mundane escort duties and fatigues for a year before returning to Nyasaland.
- Disembarked for the Battle of Ypres on the 12 October 1914.
- On 16 January 1919 Brigade Commander and Brevet Lieutenant-Colonel H. A. Walker, CMG, DSO, R.Fus., relinquished his temporary rank of Brigadier General.
- July/August 1920–1921 - He commanded the 55th Brigade Column in operations North of Hillah, Iraq.
- Colonel Walker was appointed a Brigade Commander in the Territorial Army, 21 September 1925.

== Awards, Medals and clasps ==
- Queen's South Africa Medal
  - Cape Colony clasp, 1901.
  - Orange Free State clasp, 1901.
  - Transvaal clasp, 1901.
- Africa General Service Medal
  - Jidballi clasp.
  - Somaliland 1902-04 clasp.
  - Nandi 1905-06 Clasp.
  - Somaliland 1908–10 clasp.
- 1914 Star
- Companion of the Distinguished Service Order, 1915.
- The Order of St Stanislas, 3rd Class (With Swords) 19 February 1917.
- He was appointed Companion of The Most Honourable Order of the Bath (CB) by King George V for valuable services in Mesopotamia, 9 September 1921.
- He was awarded the General Service Medal, 15 December 1923 for his duties in Iraq.
- In 1931 he was offered the award of a CBE for his military services, but he declined the proposal.

== Home life ==
Walker was born on 26 November 1874 in Brighton, Sussex. His father was Colonel Edward Walker of Mayfield, Sussex, and his mother was called Mary Josephine.

He married the widow Winifred Plunkett (born 7 March 1872, maiden name Hadwen) on 28 August 1907 at the Parish Church of St Lukes, Chelsea, London.

He had a property at Artillery Mansions, Battersea, London, but records on the 1911 census show he lived in Castle Road, Camberley, and had two servants. His last permanent address was at Manor House, Lower Woodford, Salisbury, in 1949.

He died in his home on 1 May 1953, after a short illness. He was aged 78. He left approx £18,277 in assets to his wife Winifred in his will.

== Miscellaneous ==
- He was invited to and attended the Southdown Hunt Ball, January 1899.
- He presented an ornate 17th-century Arabic manuscript on polished paper written in vocalised Naskh script to Cambridge University, possibly owned originally by Carl Brockelmann, which was used in a detailed catalogue of Islamic manuscripts, A Second Supplementary Hand-list of the Muhammadan Manuscripts in the University and Colleges of Cambridge originally published in 1952. The manuscript was sold on behalf of a charitable trust in 2013 at Sotheby's Auction House for £3,500 GBP.
