= Garadag District =

Garadag District Degmada Garadag
- District
- Location of Garadag District within Sanaag, Somaliland
- Country: Somaliland
- Region: Sanaag
- Capital: Garadag
- Time zone: UTC+3 (EAT)

Garadag District (Somali: Degmada Garadag) is a district in the Sanaag region of Somaliland. Its capital lies at Garadag.

== Demographics ==
The district is wholly dominated by the Reer Iidle Musa Abokor subdivision of the Habr Je'lo clan, part of the wider Isaaq clan-family.

== See also ==
- Administrative divisions of Somaliland
- Regions of Somaliland
- Districts of Somaliland
- Somalia–Somaliland border
