= Qoridheere =

- Village
- Location in Somaliland
- Coordinates: 9°11′0″N 46°40′0″E
- Country: Somaliland
- Region: Sool
- District: Aynabo District

Population
  - Total: 140
- Time zone: UTC+3 (EAT)

Qoridheere is a town in the Aynabo District, in the Sool region of Somaliland.
