= War Idaad =

- Town
- Location in Somaliland War Idaad (Somaliland)
- Coordinates: 9°17′2″N 46°15′9″E
- Country: Somaliland
- Region: Sool
- District: Aynabo District
- Time zone: UTC+3 (EAT)

War Idaad, also known as Wandad, Waridad, or Waridud is a town in Aynabo District, in the Sool region of Somaliland. In 2008, the surrounding villages were combined and promoted to "War Idaad District", and several more surrounding districts were combined to form the new "Saraar Region" (Gobolka Saraar). In 2020, these became Aynabo District of the Sool Region.

== History ==
In March 2008, Somaliland President Dahir Riyale Kahin announced the creation of 16 new districts in six regions, and War Idaad became part of the Saraar region. However, this was criticized as a popularity contest for election purposes.

In September 2016, a delegation led by the President of Somaliland paid a visit to War Idaad.

In November 2016, War Idaad district went into drought and Somaliland Minerals Minister Hussein Abdi Dualeh supplied food and water provided by Genel Energy to a total of 1,600 households in War Idaad and Balli Caraale districts. In March, residents of Cara Madow, in the Walidad district, received a donation from the Somaliland community in Norway. The international aid agency Islamic Relief distributed relief supplies to 400 internally displaced families in War Idaad. However, it is reported that the supplies were not necessarily delivered to the hardest-hit areas, but were diverted to other areas at the behest of powerful politicians.

In April 2018, the Cali Bare branch of the Habr Je'lo clan protested that they were not included in the Somaliland government and military cadres. The Cali Bare branch is based in Oog, but some of them also live in War Idaad.

In November 2018, Saraar district police station arrested 10 people and seized six vehicles for destroying trees in an area of 200 square kilometers for illegal charcoal manufacturing in War Idaad. The charcoal production is believed to be an act of destruction of pastureland which is flourishing in the district. The funding for this illegal production reportedly comes from the residents of Puntland.

In November 2018, a delegation led by the President of Somaliland toured this area and visited War Idaad, where they were welcomed.

In January 2019, Somaliland Insurance Minister Hinda Jama Hersi broke ground on a maternal and child health center in War Idaad, using donations from Qatar. It was completed in May.

In March 2019, a number of residents of War Idaad district contracted diphtheria and were being treated at a hospital in Aynaba, where two people died.

Heavy rainfall of 115 mm in May 2020 in War Idaad partially damaged 70 houses in low-lying areas and 50 other houses.

== See also ==
- Wadaamagoo
- Oog
- Aynabo
- Garadag
