= Wadamago =

Wadamago Wadaamagoo
- Town
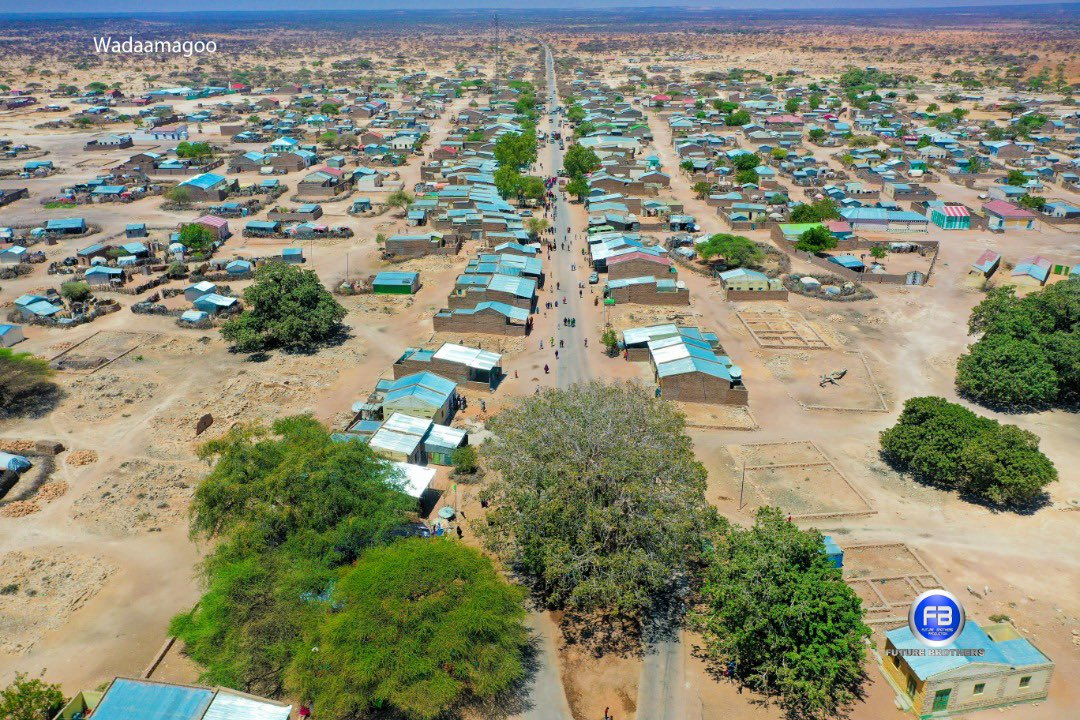

- Location in Somaliland Wadamago (Somaliland)
- Coordinates: 8°55′28″N 46°16′00″E
- Country: Somaliland
- Region: Sool
- District: Aynabo District

Government
  - Mayor: Mahamed Ahmed Naaf
- Time zone: UTC+3 (EAT)

Wadamago (Somali: Wadaamagoo) is a historic town in Aynabo District, in the Sool region of Somaliland.

== Etymology ==
The name Wadamago (Somali: Wadaamagoo) stems from the phrase Wadaamo go', meaning wadaan breaker in Somali. A wadaan is a hand made bucket that is made up of animal skin and is a watertight round cylinder, with an open top that is attached to a semicircular carrying handle, which is also attached to a rope. Somali nomads grab the rope and drop the wadaan into a well to carry water.

== Overview ==
Wadamago is situated in the Aynaba District in the western part of Sool region. Wadamago is approximately 18 km west of Aynaba, the administrative seat of the wider district. Other nearby towns include Qoorlugud (61 km), Buuhoodle (102 km) and Kirit (15 km).

The town contains a 40 ft deep cave well with an abundant supply of water, made of limestone used by nomads nearby to sustain themselves and their livestock. The altitude of the town is estimated to be 800m.

A road connecting the town to the nearby towns of Qorilugud and Buuhoodle is being constructed. Once completed, the 102 km long road will boost trade and economic activity in the Aynaba and Buuhoodle districts.

== History ==
=== Dervish movement ===
Wadamago was one of many Dervish outposts used throughout the duration of the Somaliland campaign. Guarded by some estimated 2,000 Dervish troops, it was one of the largest Dervish outposts in Somaliland. The town was described as having an abundant supply of good water from underground aquefiers.

Wadamago is also the site where a battalion led by Henry Alexander Walker performed mundane escort duties and fatigues for a year before returning to Nyasaland.

=== 1945 Sheikh Bashir Rebellion ===
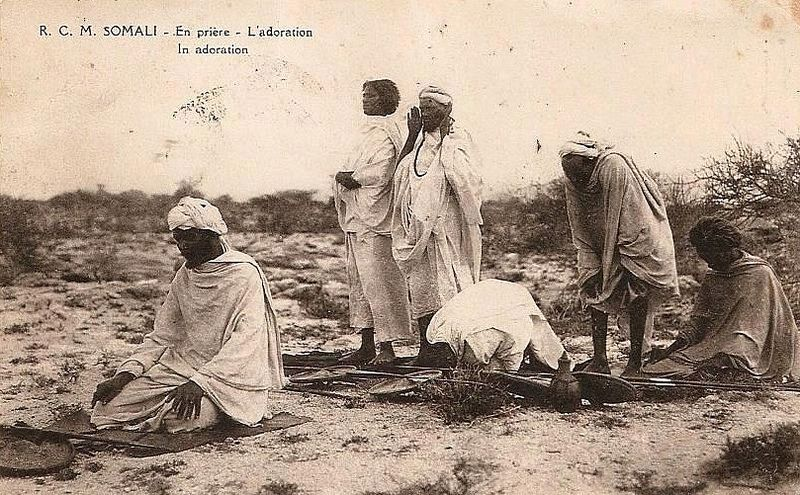
Sheikh Bashir praying Sunnah prayer, 1920

The 1945 Sheikh Bashir Rebellion was a rebellion waged by tribesmen of the Habr Je'lo clan in the former British Somaliland protectorate against British authorities in July 1945 led by Sheikh Bashir, a Somali religious leader.

On 2 July, Sheikh Bashir collected 25 of his followers in the town of Wadamago and transported them on a lorry to the vicinity of Burao, where he distributed arms to half of his followers. On the evening of 3 July the group entered Burao and opened fire on the police guard of the central prison in the city, which was filled with prisoners arrested for previous demonstrations. The group also attacked the house of the district commissioner of Burao District, Major Chambers, resulting in the death of Major Chamber's police guard before escaping to Bur Dhab, a strategic mountain south-east of Burao, where Sheikh Bashir's small unit occupied a fort and took up a defensive position in anticipation of a British counterattack.

The British campaign against Sheikh Bashir's troops proved abortive after several defeats as his forces kept moving from place to place and avoiding any permanent location. No sooner had the expedition left the area, than the news traveled fast among the Somali nomads across the plain. The war had exposed the British administration to humiliation. The government came to a conclusion that another expedition against him would be useless; that they must build a railway, make roads and effectively occupy the whole of the protectorate, or else abandon the interior completely. The latter course was decided upon, and during the first months of 1945, the advance posts were withdrawn and the British administration confined to the coast town of Berbera.

Sheikh Bashir settled many disputes among the tribes in the vicinity, which kept them from raiding each other. He was generally thought to settle disputes through the use of Islamic Sharia and gathered around him a strong following.

The British administration recruited Indian and South African troops, led by police general James David, to fight against Sheikh Bashir and had intelligence plans to capture him alive. The British authorities mobilized a police force, and eventually on 7 July found Sheikh Bashir and his unit in defensive positions behind their fortifications in the mountains of Bur Dhab. After clashes Sheikh Bashir and his second-in-command, Alin Yusuf Ali, nicknamed Qaybdiid, were killed. A third rebel was wounded and was captured along with two other rebels. The rest fled the fortifications and dispersed. On the British side the police general leading the British troops as well as a number of Indian and South African troops perished in the clashes, and a policeman was injured.

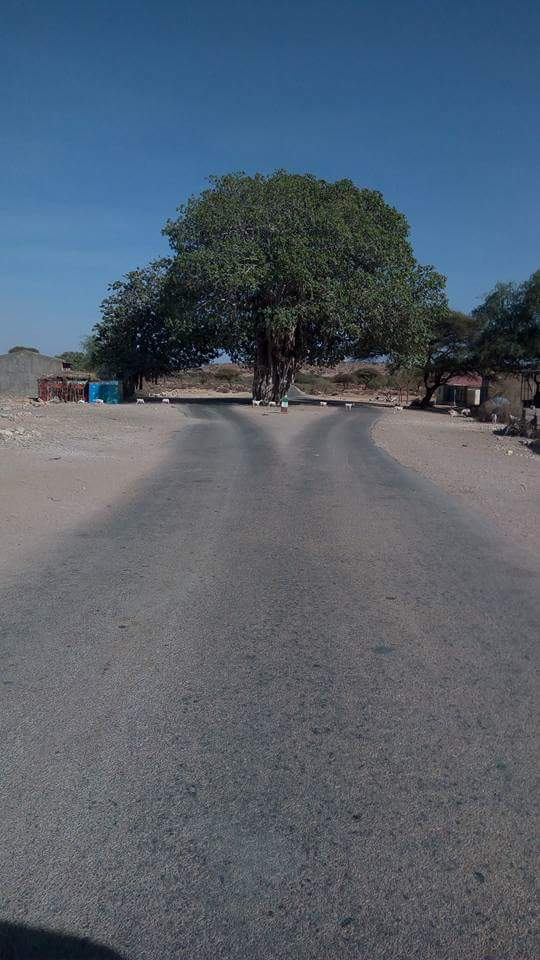
The famous Bardaha Wadaamagoo tree

After his death, Sheikh Bashir was widely hailed by locals as a martyr and was held in great reverence. His family took quick action to remove his body from the place of his death at Geela-eeg mountain, about 20 miles from Burao.

The Isaaq clan expanded into traditional Dhulbahante territory to the east. This expansion was led primarily by the Habr Je’lo subclan. The clan boundary between the Habr Je'lo and the Dhulbahante during the 19th century was traditionally in Laba Garday, a pass in the Buurdhaab mountain chain situated between War Idaad and Wadamago. The Dhulbahante had previously inhabited just east of Burao. The Habr Je'lo took advantage of the Dhulbahante's weakness after the defeat of the Dervish movement to conquer much of their important wells and grazing grounds. The Habr Je'lo subsequently expanded into and beyond the Saraar plain and the Ain Valley (which includes Wadamago), pushing the Dhulbahante southwards towards the Haud:

Thus under pressure from the Habar Tol Ja'lo expanding to their north, the Dulbahante claim that formerly their north-western boundary was the Sarar Plain now grazed mainly by Habar Tol Ja'lo. And there is good evidence that they have in fact been forced to move south. Those Dulbahante lineages which formerly grazed in the Ain region and which were accordingly called Reer ‘Aymeed today pasture their stock mainly in the scrub-lands of the northern Hand where they are known as ‘people of the bush’ (Reer Oodeed).

— Ioan Lewis

=== Somali National Movement ===
Wadamago is situated in a very strategic location, lying on the only tarmac road connecting Somaliland with Somalia, and contained a military base belonging to the Somali National Movement. As a result, the town was heavily mined by the Somali National Army led by Siad Barre during the Somaliland War of Independence.

A famous landmark associated with the town is a fig tree of the Ficus platyphylla order believed to be hundreds of years old called Bardaha Wadaamagoo. Located in the center of the town, a Chinese crew had attempted to cut the tree down during the construction of the main road in the town however after resistance from locals the road was built bending around it. The tree was used by the SNM to ambush and inflict heavy casualties on convoys of Siad Barre's soldiers passing through the town.

The bloody and costly ambushes spawned a famous saying in the town; Ninkii wadada dheer wanaag ku maroow Wadaamagoo baa wadkaa yaal, which translated from Somali means; Whoever passes by the long road in peace will meet his fate in Wadamago, in reference to the heavy Somali army casualties.

== Demographics ==
The town is exclusively inhabited by the Solomadow reeryoonis and cumar jibriil sub-division of the Habr Je'lo Isaaq clan.

According to a book written in 1952, Wadamago was inhabited by the Musa Arreh and Musa Ismail sub-division of the Habar Yoonis, Adan Madoba, Solomadow and Dahir Farah sub-division of the Habr Je'lo, sub-division of Isaaq, and Khalid and Hagr Adan sub-division of the Dhulbahante.
