= Garadag =

Garadag Garadag (Somali) جردج (Arabic)
- Town
- Location in Somaliland Garadag (Somaliland)
- Coordinates: 9°29′15″N 46°52′1″E
- Country: Somaliland
- Region: Sanaag
- District: Garadag

Government
  - Mayor: Abdullahi Suleiman Boobe

Population (2026)
  - Total: 150,000
- Time zone: UTC+3 (EAT)

Garadag (Somali: Gar Adag,district Arabic: جردج) is a key town in the Sanaag region of Somaliland.

== Overview ==
Garadag was founded in 1934 and is located northwest of Xudun and east by road from War Idaad. One of the main Landmarks of the town is "Geedka Garadag", a famous tree under which numerous peace meetings or shirs have taken place over the years.

The name Garadag in the Somali language means "a difficult case", in reference to a marital dispute between two men regarding a girl that was promised to one of the men but married off to the other.

In November 1992, a peace conference by Habr Je'lo, Dhulbahante, Warsangali and Gahayle was held in Garadag. Habar Yoonis did not participate in this conference, which is one of the causes of the later clan conflict.

== Demographics ==
As of 2026 Garadag had a population of approximately 150,000.

== Education ==
According to the Somaliland Ministry of Planning Garadag contains 32 public primary and secondary schools, with the wider district containing an additional 15 schools.

== See also ==
- Administrative divisions of Somaliland
- Regions of Somaliland
- Districts of Somaliland
- Somalia–Somaliland border
