= Genel Energy =

British oil company

- Type: Public
- Traded as: LSE: GENL
- Industry: Oil and gas industry
- Predecessor: Genel Enerji; Vallares
- Founded: 2011
- Headquarters: London, England
- Area served: Iraqi Kurdistan; Somaliland; Oman
- Key people: Patrick Allman-Ward (Chairman); Paul Weir (CEO)
- Website: www.genelenergy.com

Genel Energy plc is a publicly listed exploration and production oil company, listed on the London Stock Exchange. The company owns an interest in the Tawke production sharing contract in the Kurdistan Region of Iraq, as well as licences in Somaliland and Oman. The company has offices in London, Istanbul, and Hargeisa, and the registered office of the parent company is in Jersey.

== History ==
Genel Energy signed its first production sharing contract, as a private company, for the Taqtaq Oil Field in the town of Taqtaq in the Kurdistan Region of Iraq in 2002, and from then on expanded its footprint in the region, notably adding an interest in the Tawke production sharing contract in 2009. In 2011, Genel Energy plc was listed on the London Stock Exchange as a result of a merger with the investment vehicle Vallares Plc.

In 2012, Genel established its presence in Africa through acquisition of interests in Somaliland. Genel extended its global footprint in March 2025 by signing agreements to enter into an Exploration and Production Sharing Agreement for Block 54 in the Sultanate of Oman, with a 40% working interest, as non-operator.

== Operations ==
=== Kurdistan ===
Genel has been operating in the Kurdistan Region of Iraq since 2002, and production from Genel’s fields has been integral in the development of the KRI oil industry. Current production is met through Genel’s 25% working interest in the Tawke licence, where DNO is the operator.

=== Somaliland ===
Genel has maintained a presence in Somaliland since 2012 through acquisition of exploration assets. Initially the SL10B13 licence and later, in 2013, adding the Odewayne licence, which was subsequently exited in 2025.

=== Oman ===
In March 2025, Genel announced the signing of agreements to enter into Block 54 Exploration and Production Sharing Agreement, in partnership with OQ Exploration & Production SAOG (“OQEP”).
