= Buur Dhaab =

Mountain range in Somaliland

- Location within Sool Location within Somaliland

Highest point
- Elevation: 973 m (3,192 ft)
- Coordinates: 9°5′7″N 46°19′9″E

Naming
- Native name: Buuraha Buurdhaab (Somali); جبال بورطاب (Arabic)

Geography
- Location: Togdheer and Sool, Somaliland

Buur Dhaab, also known as Buurdhaab or Bur Dab (Somali: Buuraha Buurdhaab, Arabic: جبال بورطاب), is a mountain range situated in the Togdheer and Sool regions of Somaliland. The mountain range stands at an elevation of 973 m, or 3,193 ft.

== Description ==
The name "Buur Dhaab" translates to "rocky hill" in Somali. The range forms the northern rim of the Ain Valley, and separates it and the Nugal Valley from the Haud.

J Murray, who went on an expedition to Buur Dhaab, describes the range:

We ascended a high bluff of Bur Dab about 1000 feet above camp, and found that the hill was composed of trap-rock, the inside falling away to a basin tunnelled in all directions by caves, said to be inhabited by robbers whenever they come here. The regular stratification of the rocks and the general formation did not seem to warrant the assumption that this basin is the crater of a volcano, as stated by some travellers to the Italian Geographical Society

== History ==
Buur Dhaab has also historically acted as a junction for trade caravans coming from the east on their way to Berbera port, passing through the Laba Gardai or Bah Lardis pass located within the range. The powerful Habr Je'lo clan has historically acted as the guardians of this pass, receiving dues in exchange for guaranteed safety through Buur Dhaab:

The Habr Toljaala are a powerful tribe, and make it a point of honour that caravans shall have safe passage through their country, and they receive a part of the dues for this purpose.

The range is home to three Dervish stone forts located at Shimber Berris, constructed by Yemeni Arab masons on the orders of Mohammed Abdullah Hassan after the Battle of Dul Madoba.

=== Sheikh Bashir Rebellion ===
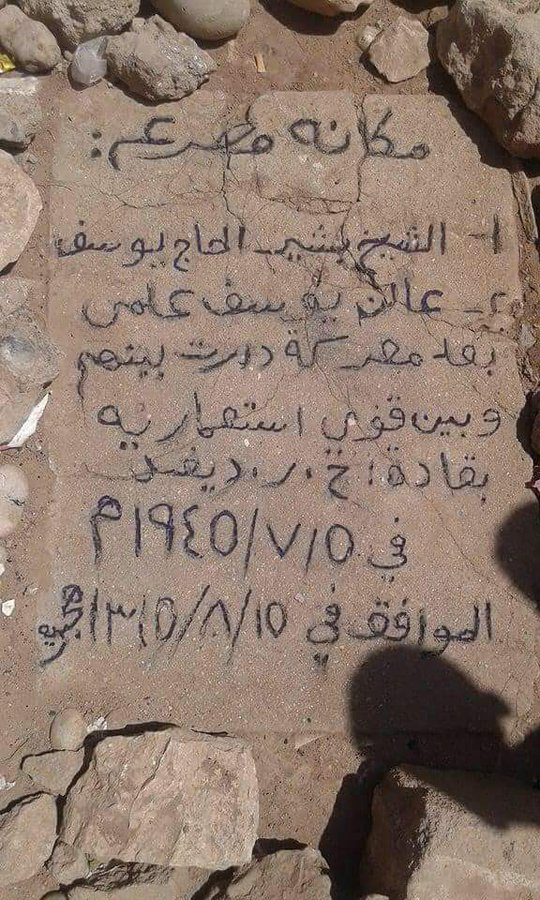
Site of the death of Sheikh Bashir in Bur Dhab

Buur Dhaab was the base of Sheikh Bashir during his 1945 rebellion against the British authorities in Somaliland. On the evening of 3 July Sheikh Bashir and his followers entered Burao and opened fire on the police guard of the central prison in the city, which was filled with prisoners arrested for previous demonstrations. The group also attacked the house of the district commissioner of Burao District, Major Chambers, resulting in the death of Major Chamber's police guard before escaping to the range, where Sheikh Bashir's small unit occupied a fort and took up a defensive position in anticipation of a British counterattack. The British administration recruited Indian and South African troops, led by police general James David, to fight against Sheikh Bashir and had intelligence plans to capture him alive. The British authorities mobilized a police force, and eventually on 7 July found Sheikh Bashir and his unit in defensive positions behind their fortifications in the mountains of Bur Dhab. After clashes Sheikh Bashir and his second-in-command, Alin Yusuf Ali, nicknamed Qaybdiid, were killed. A third rebel was wounded and was captured along with two other rebels. The rest fled the fortifications and dispersed. On the British side the police general leading the British troops as well as a number of Indian and South African troops perished in the clashes, and a policeman was injured.

After his death, Sheikh Bashir was widely hailed by locals as a martyr and was held in great reverence. His family took quick action to remove his body from the place of his death at Geela-eeg mountain, about 20 miles from Burao.

=== War of Independence ===
The Bur Dab range served as a base for the Somali National Movement (SNM) during the Somaliland War of Independence, and has been the site of hit-and-run attacks against the Somali National Army. A contingent led by former Somaliland Interior Minister Mohamed Kahin Ahmed consisting of 130 soldiers assaulted regime positions in the range, inflicting heavy casualties.

== Flaura and fauna ==
The range mostly consists of trap-rock, gypsum, and stratified eocene limestone rock, and has been noted for its myrrh. The range was home to a rhinoceros population, which has since gone extinct. Aloe also grows abundantly in the range.

== Oil explorations ==
In August 2012, the Somaliland government awarded Genel Energy license to explore oil within its territory. Results of a surface seep study completed early in 2015 confirmed the outstanding potential offered in SL-10B and SL-13 block and Oodweyne block with estimated oil reserves of 1 billion barrel each. Genel Energy is set to drill exploration well for SL-10B and SL-13 block in the Buur Dhaab range by the end of 2018. Somaliland Toosan Well 1 Drills in Place in 2024 after successful seismic data Toosan Oil estimates around 700 Million barrels of Crude.

== Demographics ==
The Buur Dhaab range is mainly inhabited by the Habr Je'lo clan, part of the wider Isaaq clan-family in Somaliland, with the Mohammed Abokor noted for grazing in the area.
