= Ioan Lewis =

British anthropologist (1930–2014)

I. M. Lewis
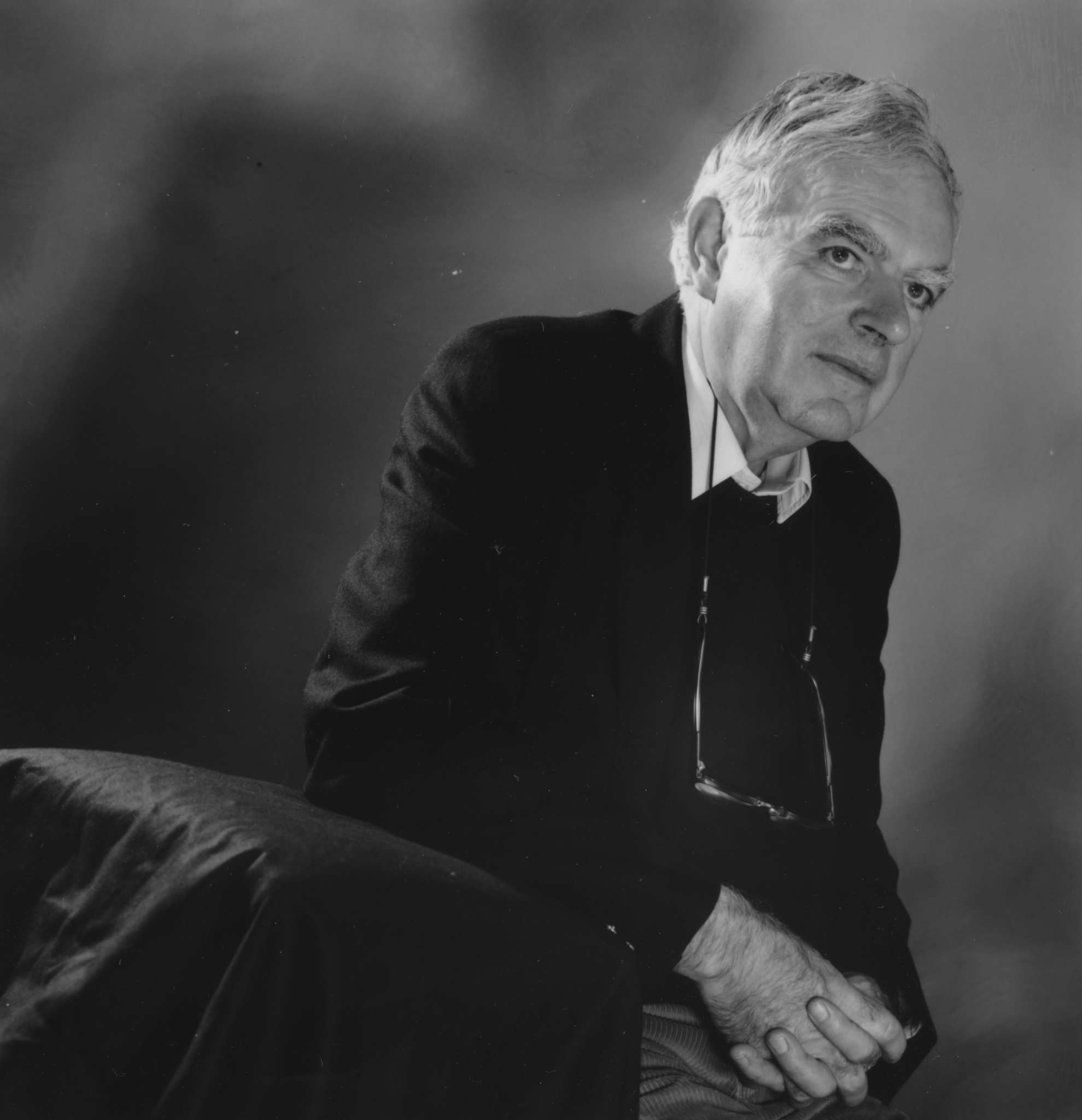
- Born: Ioan Myrddin Lewis; 30 January 1930; Glasgow, Scotland
- Died: 14 March 2014 (aged 84)
- Education: University of Glasgow (BSc); Oxford University (BLitt, DPhil)
- Scientific career
- Fields: Anthropology
- Institutions: London School of Economics

Ioan Myrddin Lewis FBA (30 January 1930 – 14 March 2014), popularly known as I. M. Lewis, was a Scottish professor of anthropology at the London School of Economics.

== Early life and education ==
Born in Scotland to a Welsh father and a Scottish mother, Lewis lived in Glasgow after the death of his father during his childhood.

He was educated at Glasgow High School before receiving a Bachelor of Science in Chemistry from the University of Glasgow in 1951. He proceeded to St Catherine's College, Oxford, where he obtained a diploma in Anthropology in 1952 with the aid of a grant from the Nuffield Foundation, and a Bachelor of Letters in 1953. He studied under Franz Steiner and social anthropologist Sir Edward Evan Evans-Pritchard, who was himself an authority on the Nuer and Azande people of South Sudan, as a graduate student – finishing with a doctorate in 1957.

Steiner was working on a multi-language bibliography on the Somali, Afar (Danakil), and Saho peoples, a project for the International African Institute. After his death, Lewis completed the task of bringing it to publication.

== Career ==
He was renowned internationally as the foremost scholar on Somali history and culture, on which he has published numerous articles and books. Zitelmann characterised him as "the doyen of 'Somali studies'".

Lewis taught at the University of Rhodesia. Returning to the United Kingdom, he lectured at Glasgow and UCL. He then proceeded to the London School of Economics and Political Science in 1969 as a professor, where he remained until his retirement in 1992. "In 1969 Lewis was considered to be the youngest professor in Great Britain." He was also the editor of Man (Journal of the Royal Anthropological Institute; 1959–1972), as well as the Honorary Director of the London-based International African Institute from 1982 to 1988.

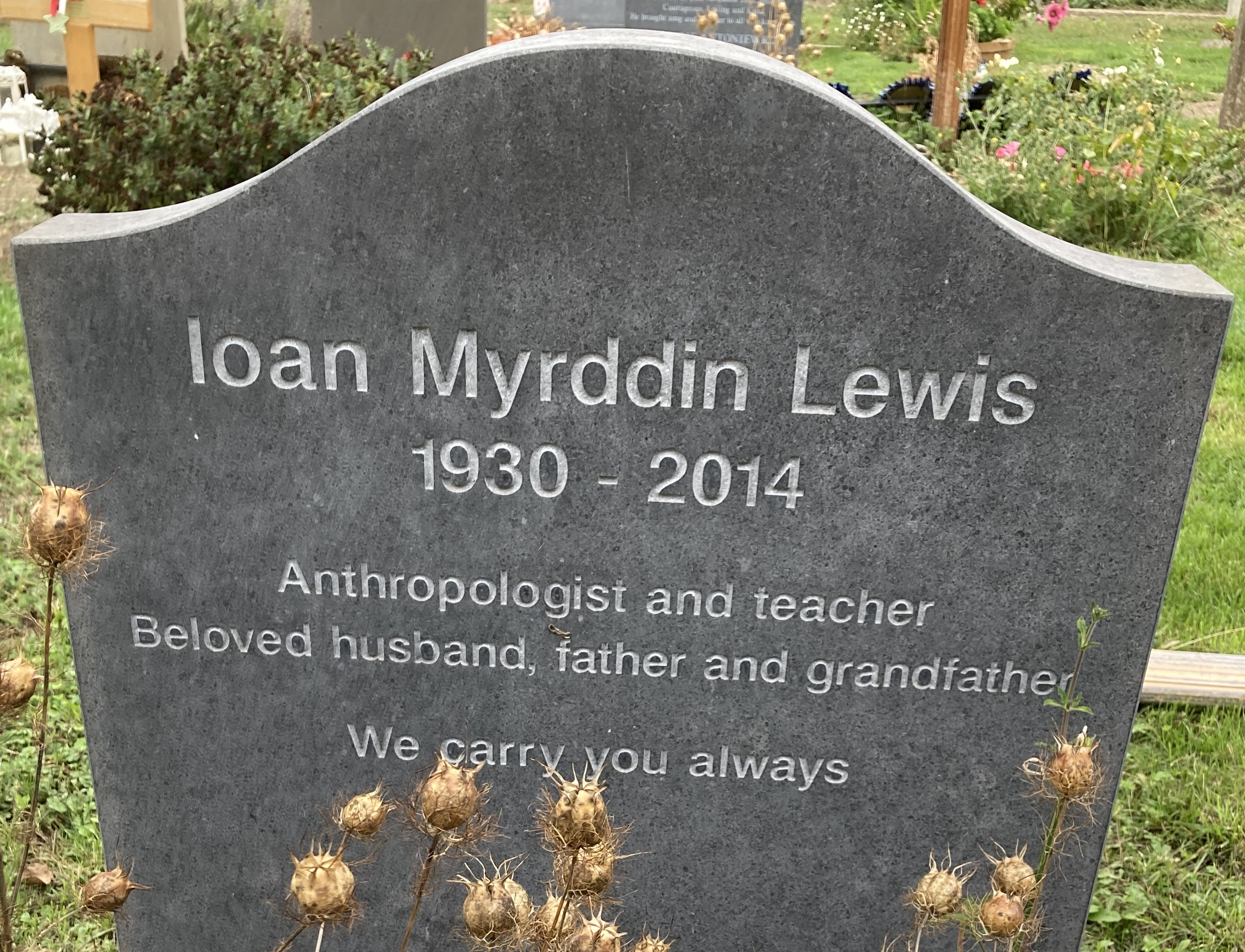
Grave of Ioan Lewis in Highgate Cemetery

His academic interests in Somalia were broad, including published studies in varied fields:

- Somali and other oral poetry in the Horn of Africa;
- clan, nation, state building and failure in Somalia and beyond;
- types of Islam among the Somali and in sub-Saharan Africa;
- possession cults and ecstatic religions;
- last but not least taking position in general anthropology.

Lewis was not appreciated by the Somali President Siyad Barre (1969–1990), so he and his team were prevented from conducting a planned refugee survey in Somalia on behalf of the UNHCR.

His work was sometimes criticised by other Somali studies scholars as informed by a colonialist and patriarchal approach. Despite this, many aspects of Lewis' analysis of Somali society have remained prevalent in Somali studies from the 1960s until today.

He died on 14 March 2014 and was buried on the eastern side of Highgate Cemetery.

== Selected bibliography ==
=== Books ===
- Lewis, Ioan (1994). Peoples of the Horn of Africa (Somali, Afar and Saho): North Eastern Africa, Part I. London: Haan Associates. ISBN 9781569021040.
- Lewis, Ioan (1998). Saints and Somalis: Popular Islam in a Clan-based Society. The Red Sea Press. ISBN 9781569021033.
- Lewis, Ioan (2008). Understanding Somalia and Somaliland. New York: Columbia University Press. ISBN 9780231700849.
- Lewis, Ioan (2003). Ecstatic Religion: A Study of Shamanism and Spirit Possession. New York: Routleldge. ISBN 9780415301244.
- Lewis, Ioan (2002). A Modern History of the Somali: Nation and State in the Horn of Africa (4th ed.). James Currey. ISBN 9780852554838.

=== Journal articles ===
- Lewis, Ioan (1962). "Historical Aspects of Genealogies in Northern Somali Social Structure". The Journal of African History. 3 (1): 35–48. doi:10.1017/s0021853700002723. JSTOR 179798. S2CID 143958154.
- Lewis, Ioan (1961). "Force and Fission in Northern Somali Lineage Structure". American Anthropologist. 63 (1): 94–112. doi:10.1525/aa.1961.63.1.02a00060. JSTOR 667340.
- Lewis, I. M. (1963). "Pan-Africanism and Pan-Somalism". The Journal of Modern African Studies. 1 (2): 147–161. doi:10.1017/s0022278x00001038. JSTOR 159026. S2CID 155073157.
- Lewis, I. M. (1958). "The Gadabuursi Somali Script". Bulletin of the School of Oriental and African Studies, University of London. 21 (1/3): 134–156. doi:10.1017/s0041977x00063278. JSTOR 610496. S2CID 161856327.
- Lewis, I. M. (1959). "Clanship and Contract in Northern Somaliland". Africa: Journal of the International African Institute. 29 (3): 274–293. doi:10.2307/1157617. JSTOR 1157617. S2CID 143243256.
- Lewis, I. M. (1967). "Recent Developments in the Somali Dispute". African Affairs. 66 (263): 104–112. doi:10.1093/oxfordjournals.afraf.a095586. JSTOR 720296.
