= Somalia–Somaliland border =

International border

Somaliland–Somalia border
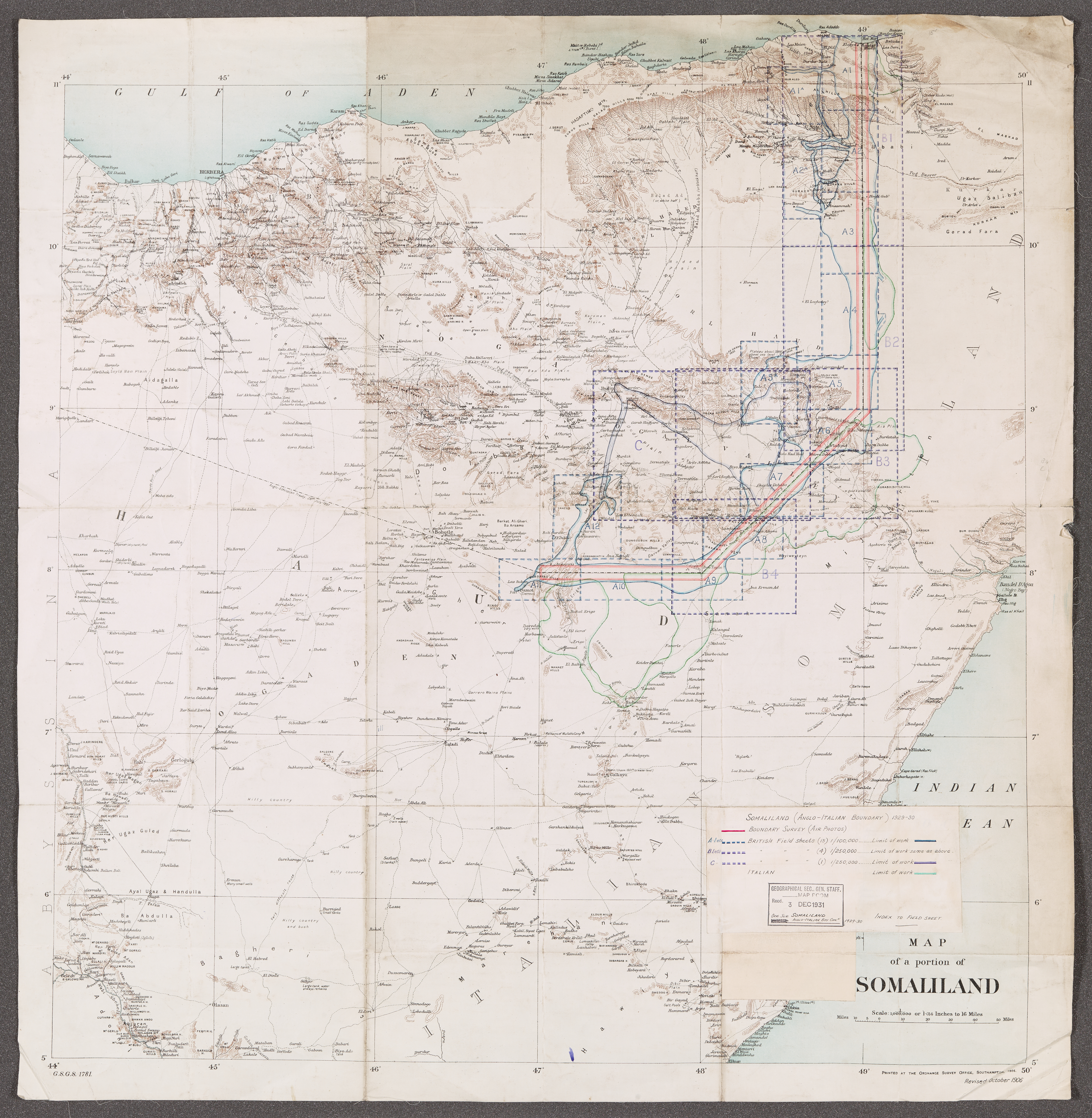
- British Somaliland and Italian Somaliland border by Anglo-Italian Boundary Commission, 1929–1930

Characteristics
- Entities: Somalia; Somaliland
- Length: 407 kilometers (253 mi)

History
- Established: 1894
- Current shape: 1929 (Somaliland's claim)
- Treaties: Somaliland. Anglo-Italian Boundary Treaty.

The Somalia–Somaliland border (Somali: Xuduuda Soomaaliya iyo Soomaaliland; Arabic: الحدود بين الصومال وصوماليلاند) is the disputed border between Somalia and the self-declared sovereign state of Somaliland. It is an international border that separates two countries, while the Somali government and most other countries refer to it as the "Administrative Boundary Line". The government of Somaliland regards itself as the successor of the independent State of Somaliland, united in 1960 with the Trust Territory of Somaliland.

== History ==
=== Anglo-Italian Boundary Treaty era (1894 and 1960) ===
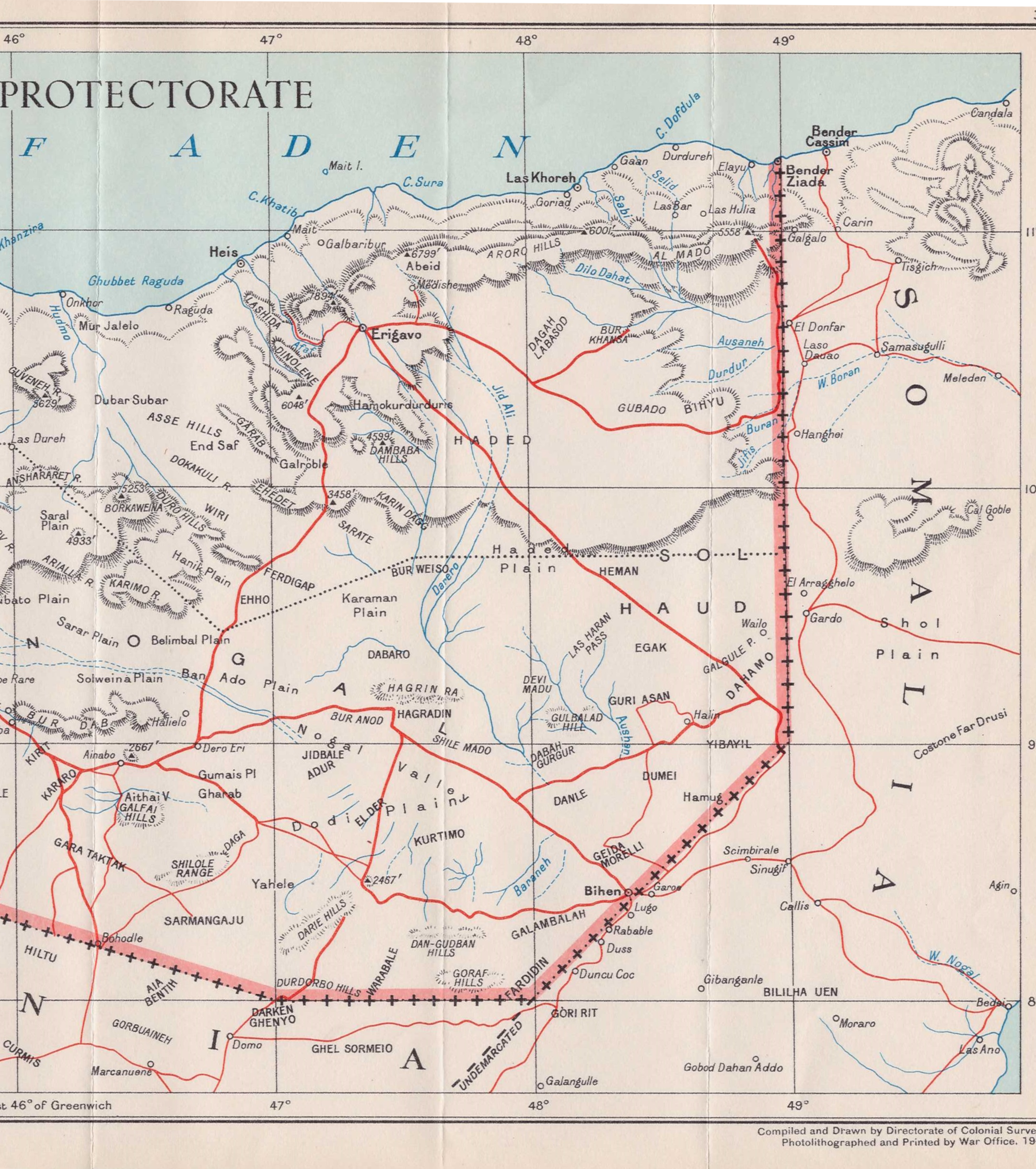
Somaliland–Somalia border in 1948

In May 1894, the border between Somaliland and Somalia was demarcated by the Anglo-Italian. Officially implemented in 1929, it extends along longitude 49 (49E), from the Gulf of Aden to 9°N latitude, and then diagonally across the intersection of longitude 48 (48E) and 8N latitude. West along 8N latitude which is the beginning of the border between Somaliland and Ethiopia.

The names of the villages that are close to the border:

- A1 Hills (A1 Mado)
- Bunda Ziada
- Bosaso or Bender Casim (Italian)
- Hegligab (Higle-Gab)
- Sorl Hand
- Darror
- Hauratiroh
- Marojeh
- Khumberl (E1 Gumbuhul)
- Hobat
- Dugaan
- E1 Dibr
- Galweineh
- Darado
- Wareigleh

=== Restoration of sovereignty (1991) ===
After a long war of independence with the Siad Barre regime, in 1991, Somaliland regained sovereignty from Somali Democratic Republic, which is not recognized by the Somali government.

According to the constitution voted for by the people of Somaliland, the border between Somaliland and Somalia is the border of the State of Somaliland which gained independence on May 26, 1960.

=== Disputed territory ===
The Puntland state disputes the Sool and Sanaag regions, as well as parts of Togdheer.

== Historical maps ==
Historical maps of the border from north to south in the International Map of the World.

between Somalia Italia and State of Somaliland

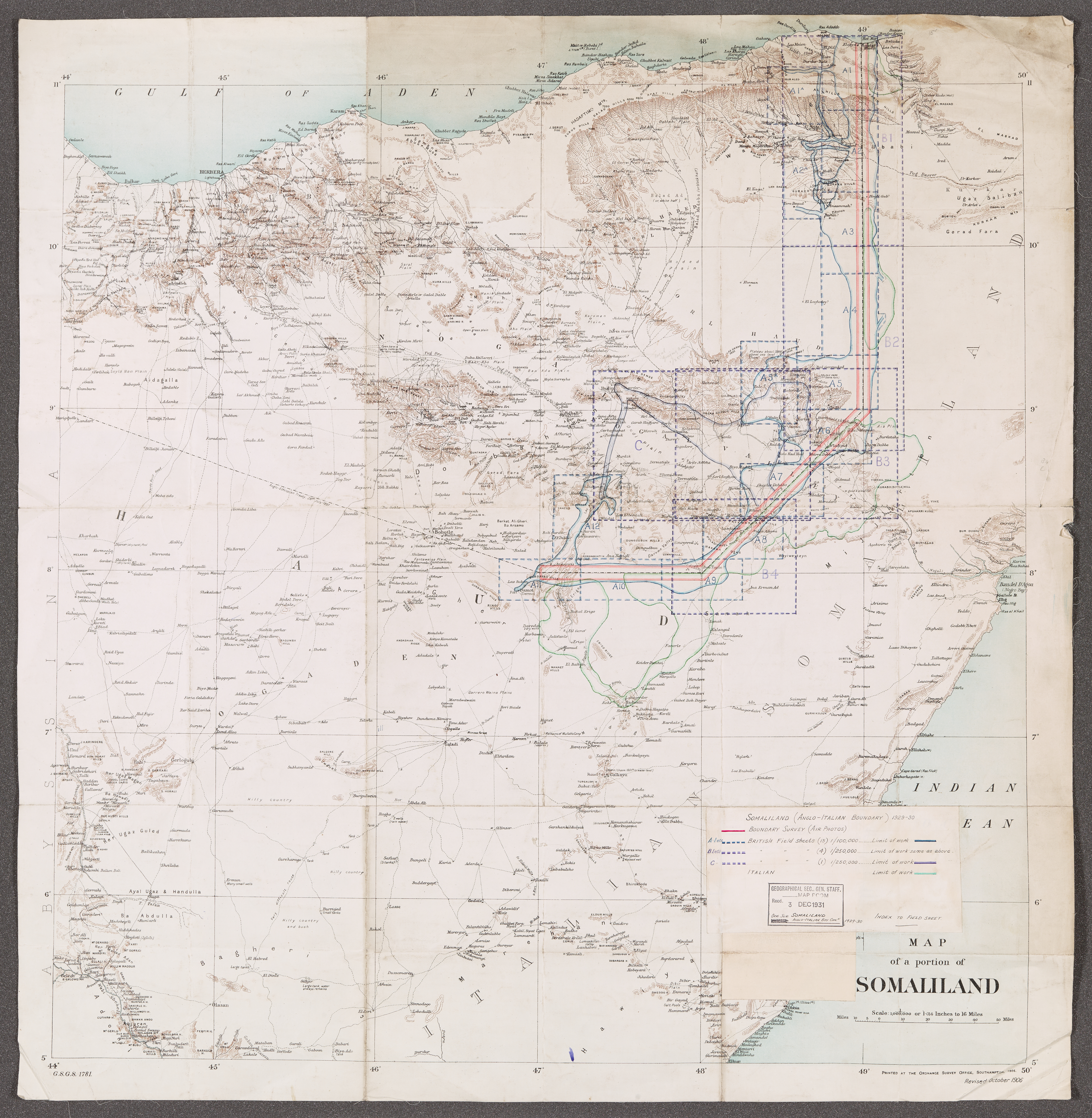
full limits

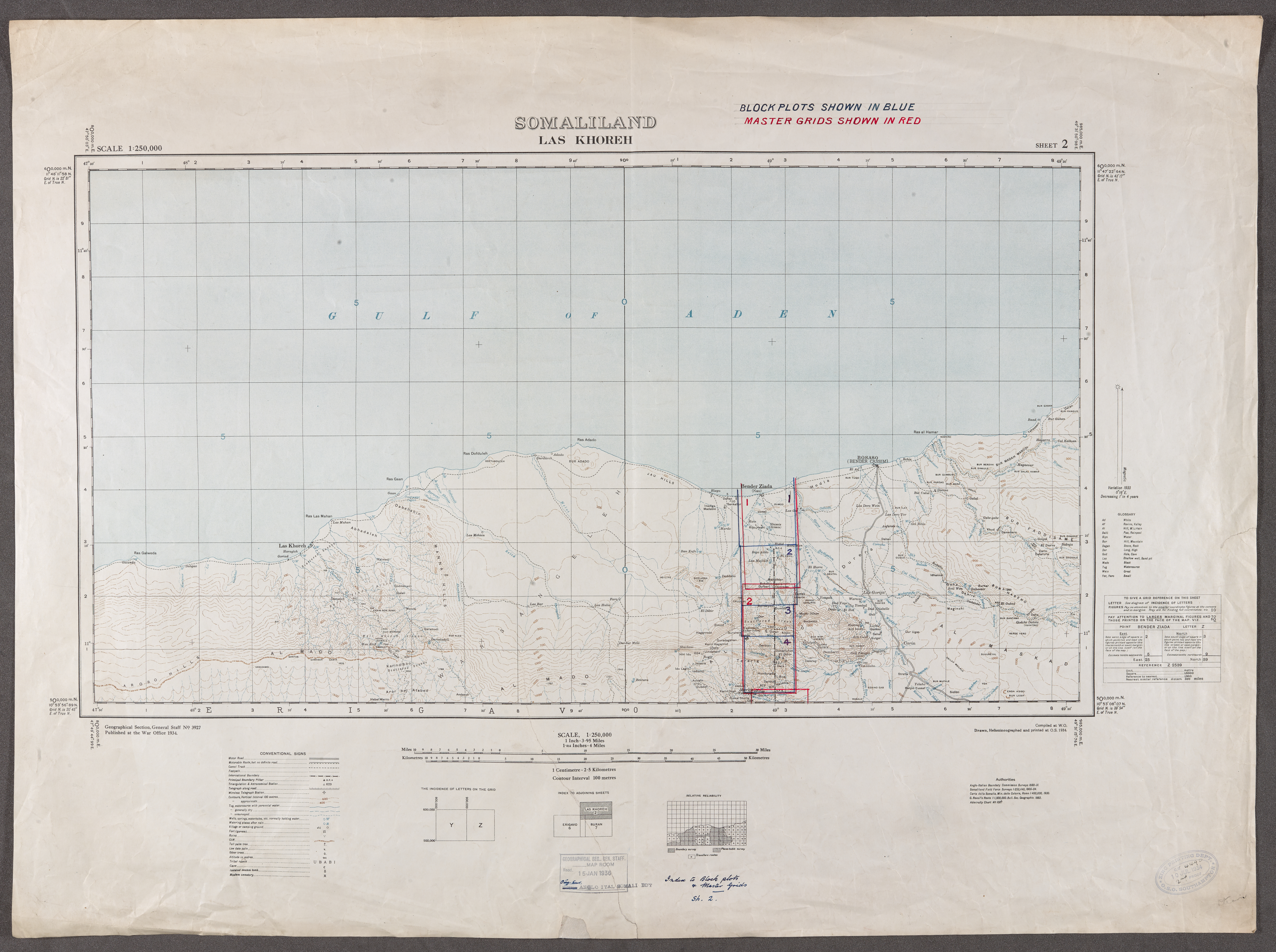

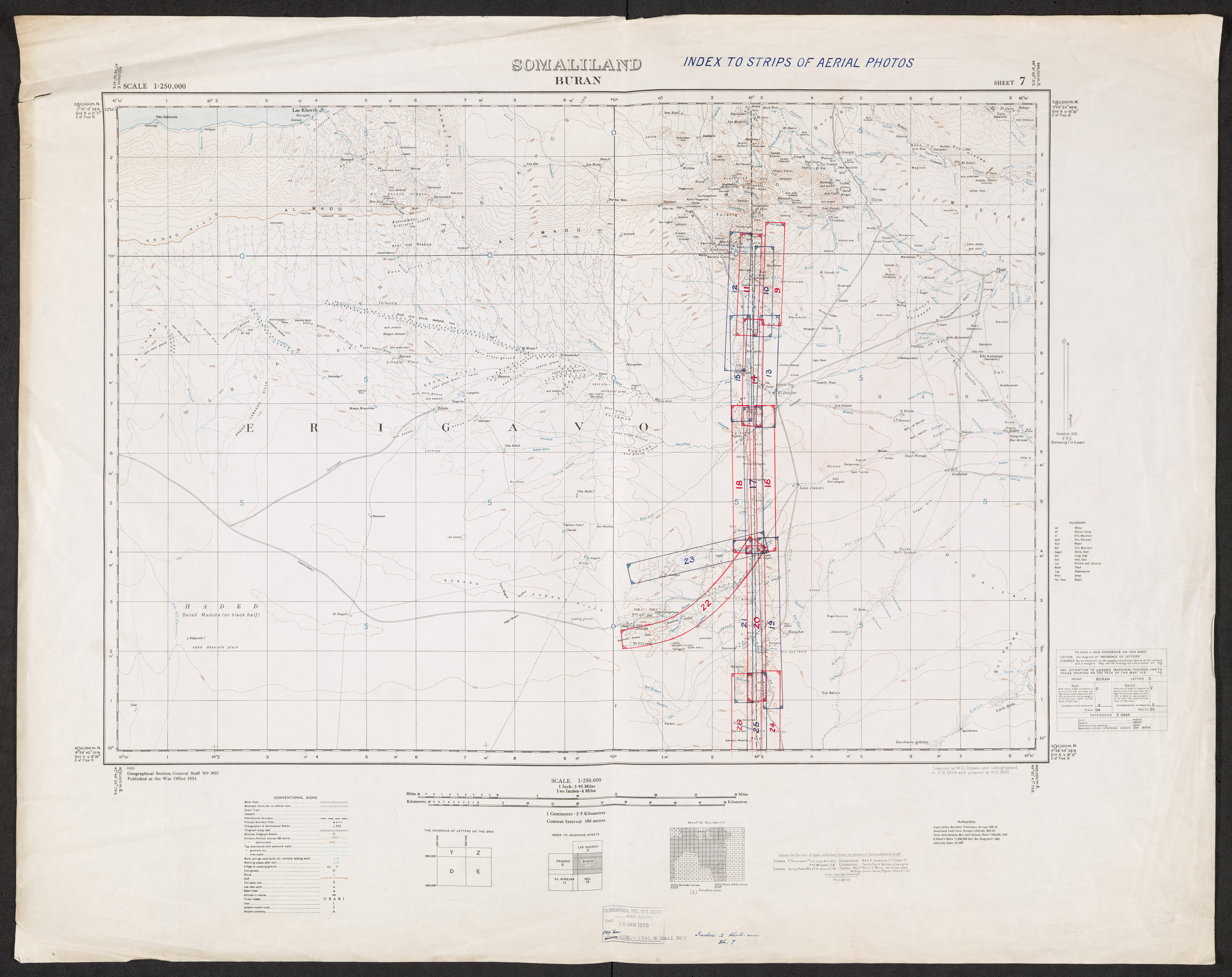

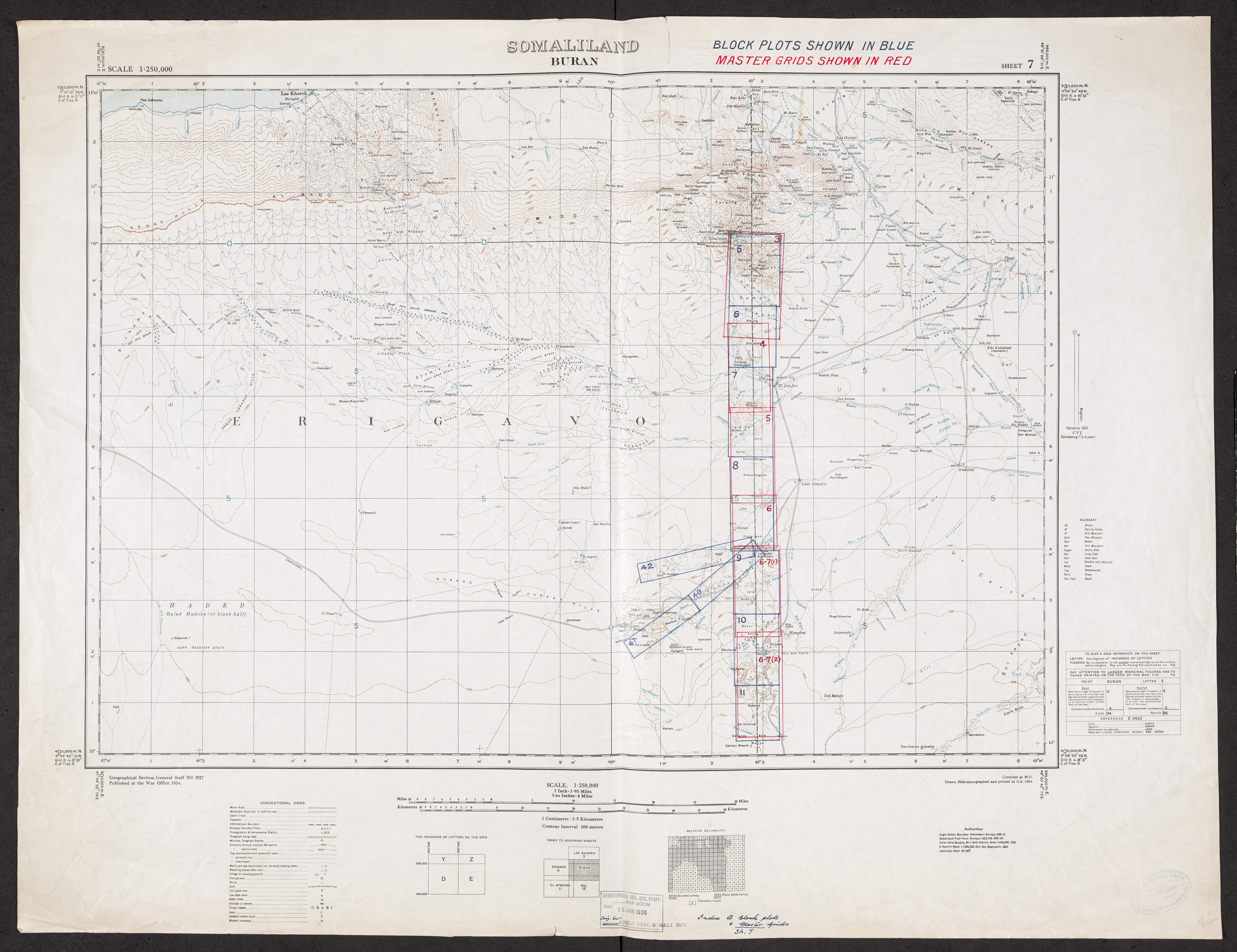

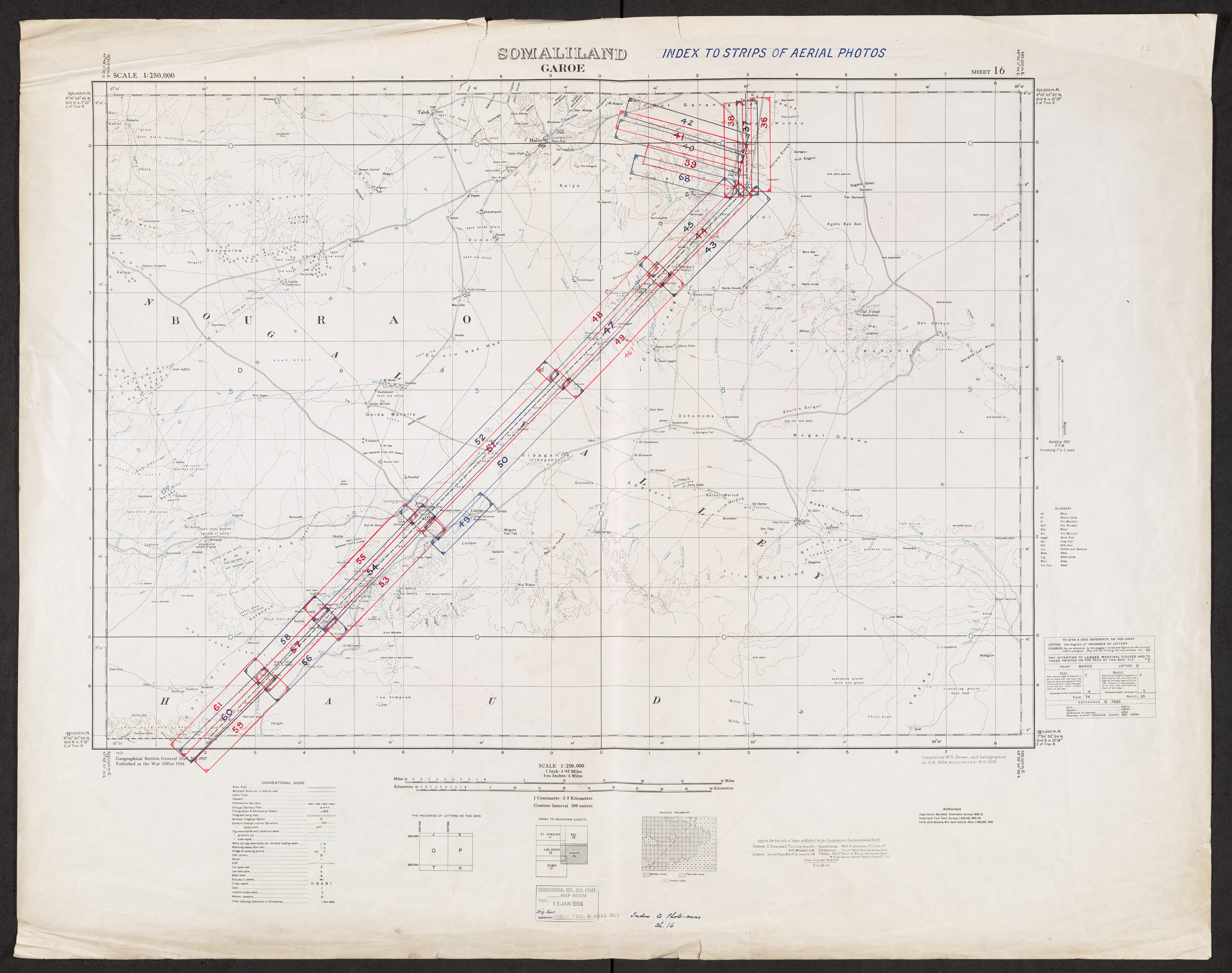

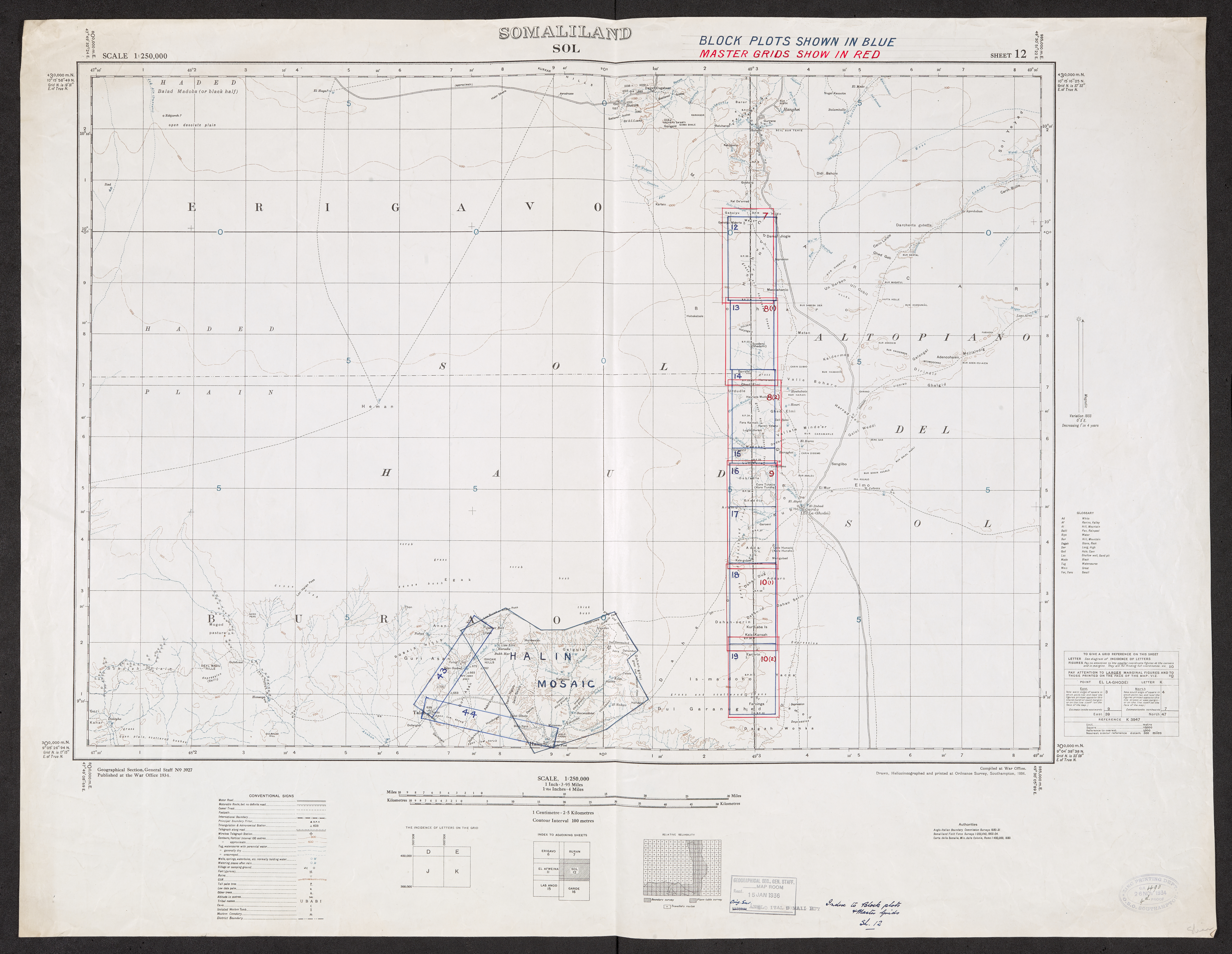

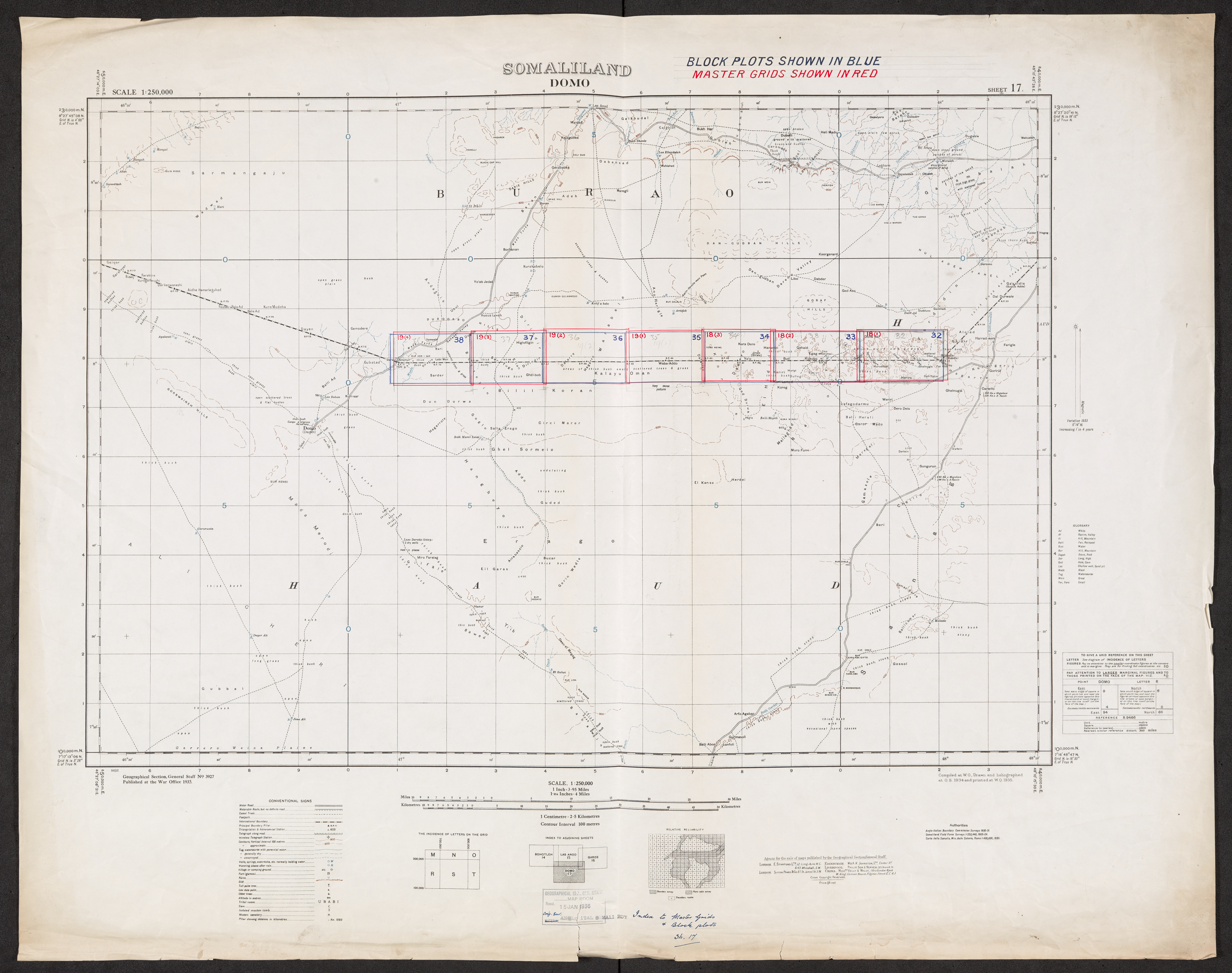

== See also ==
- Somaliland
