= Musa Abokor =

Somali clan

Muuse Abokor موسى أبو بكر
- Somaliland

Regions with significant populations
- Ethiopia, Somaliland

Languages
- Somali, Arabic

Religion
- Islam

Related ethnic groups
- Other Habr Je'lo clans, and Isaaq

The Musa Abokor reeryoonis (Somali: Muuse Abokor, Arabic: موسى بن أبو بكر full name: Mūsa ibn Abū Bakr ibn Jibrīl ibn Abū Bakr ibn Mūsa ibn ash-Shaykh Isḥāq ibn Aḥmad) is a Somali clan, and a 2 major sub-division of the muuse sh isxaaq clan of the Isaaq clan-family.

The Musa Abokor are one of the largest sub-divisions of the Habr Je'lo clan family. They inhabit the Togdheer, Sahil, Sanaag and Sool regions of Somaliland. They exclusively dominate the Aynabo district in Sool . Garadag district in Sanaag and El Afweyn district in Sanaag, as well as reside the provincial capital of Erigavo.Also they are well resided the provincial capital of Burao togdheer They are also present in Isiolo, Kenya, where they form part of the Isahakia community. Major sub-divisions of the clan include the Bi'iide, Reer Yoonis, Uduruhmiin, Bahmajeelo, Buraale Yoonis, Mahamed Bare and Ali Barre.

== Overview ==
Members of the subclan are descendants of Musa Abokor, the great-great-great-grandson of Sheikh Ishaaq bin Ahmed. The full name of the subclan is Mūsa ibn Abū Bakr ibn Jibrīl ibn Abū Bakr ibn Mūsa ibn ash-Shaykh Ishaaq ibn Aḥmad. Historically, the Musa Abokor along with the Omar obtained much of their wealth via their frankincense plantations in the mountainous interior adjacent to the coastline, whereas the Mohamed Abokor were chiefly nomadic pastoralists.

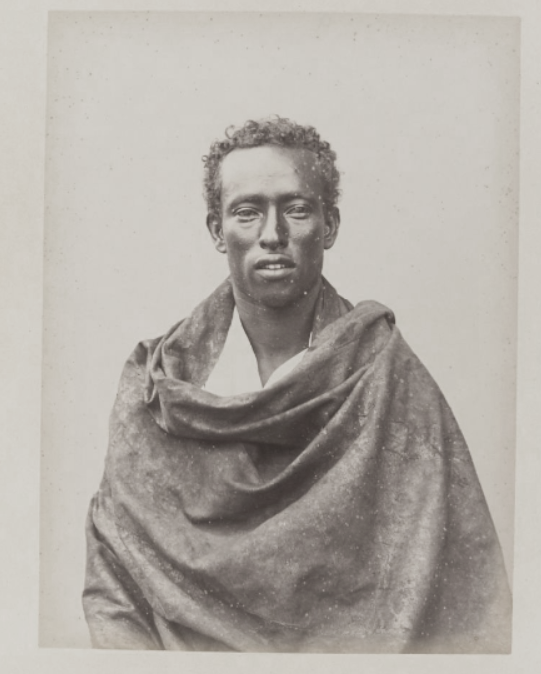
Dualeh Abdi of the Musa Abokor Habr Je'lo clan, photographed in 1890 Erigavo Sanaag

== History ==
=== Lineage ===
Sheikh Ishaaq ibn Ahmed was one of the Dir scholars that crossed the sea from Arabia to the Horn of Africa to spread Islam around 12th to 13th century. Hence the Sheikh belonged to the Dir or Sada.Shiekh Isxaaq married two local women in Somaliland that left him eight sons, one of them being Abdulrahman (Awal). The descendants of those eight sons constitute the Isaaq clan-family.

=== 19th century ===
The Habr Je’lo coastal settlements and ports, stretching from Siyara in the west to Heis (Xiis) in the east, were important to trade and communication with the Somali interior. While the settlements were not as significant as the more established ports of Berbera, Zeila and Bulhar (respectively), the principle Habr Je’lo port of Kurrum (Karin) was a major market for livestock and frankincense procured from the interior, and was a favorite for livestock traders due to the close proximity of the port to Aden. Habr Je’lo traders acted as middlemen to Dhulbahante livestock herders in the interior by purchasing and/or bartering their stock for export to the Aden market:

“The last branch of the Western tribes is the Haber el Jahleh, who possess the sea-ports from Seyareh to the ruined village of Rukudah, and as far as the town of Heis. Of these towns, Kurrum is the most important, from its possessing a tolerable harbour, and from its being the nearest point from Aden, the course to which place is N.N.W., consequently the wind is fair, and the boats laden with sheep for the Aden market pass but one night at sea, whilst those from Berbera are generally three. What greatly enhances the value of Kurrum however is its proximity to the country of the Dulbahanta, who approach within four days of Kurrum, and who therefore naturally have their chief trade through that port.

=== Soocane faction ===
During the early to mid 19th century the Musa Abokor, along with other sub-divisions of the Habr Je'lo, were part of a military faction known as Soocane. The faction was led by Kite Fiqi, a military leader and poet belonging to the Reer Yoonis sub-division of the Musa Abokor.

=== Participation in the Dervish movement ===
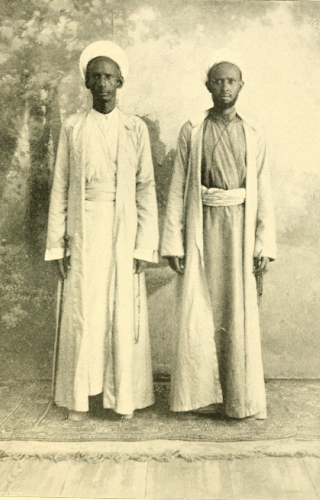
Haji Sudi on the left with his brother in-law Duale Idres. Aden, 1892.

The Habr Je’lo were one of the first clans in the Somaliland Protectorate to revolt against the Colonial government between the late 19th and early 20th centuries. Among their prominent anti-colonial ideologues during the Dervish period were Deria Arale, Abdallah Shihiri, Ibrahim Boghol and Haji Sudi, the latter is credited for importing Dervish customs into the Somali peninsula as well as being one of the original founders of the Somali Dervish Movement. Moreover, the Habr Je'lo played an influential role after the demise of the Dervish Movement in 1920, with Sheikh Bashir Yussuf and Farah Omar being important anti-colonial notables.

According to the British War Office, the Musa Abokor provided significant armaments to the Dervish forces in the interior.The Musa Abokor also made up a significant part of the Dervish forces, with a force of 2,000 Sa'ad Yunis and Uduruhmin Dervishes led by Ibrahim Boghol laying siege to Las Khorey, the capital of the Warsangeli, in retaliation for the Warsangeli raiding the Dervish fort in Jidali. Ibrahim's forces captured the eastern portion of the town, killing many Warsangeli fighters. The force managed to surround the settlement and capture the only source of water, causing many to die of thirst. While Las Khorey was being besieged, the Warsangeli were able to secretly send a dhow to Aden to request help from the British Navy, and on 10 May Lancelot Turton commanding HMS Northbrook arrived at Las Khorey and commenced to shell Ibrahim and his forces with Lyddite explosives, forcing them to retreat to the mountains and thus ending the deadly siege.

== Clan tree ==
Below is a breakdown of the different sub-divisions of the Muse Abokor subclan:

Musa Abokor

- Abdirahin Muse
- Idris Muse
- Abdirahman Muse
  - Abdille Abdirahman (Bah Majeelo)
  - Osman Abdirahman (Bah Majeelo)
  - Isaaq Abdirahman (Bah Majeelo)
  - Yunis Abdirahman (Rer Yunis)
      - Mohamed Yunis
      - Osman Yunis
  - Barre Abdirahman
    - Mohamed Barre
    - Ali Barre
    - Yunis Barre
      - Burale Yunis
      - Bi'ide Yunis (Biciide)
        - Wadhowr Biciide (Bahsanbuur)
        - Samatar Biciide (Bahsanbuur)
        - Iidle Biciide (Bah Jibrahil)
        - Farah Biciide (Bah Jibrahil)
          - Omar Farah (Boho)
          - Fahiye Farah (Boho)
          - Muse Farah (Boho)
          - Robsuge Farah (Boho)
          - Gedi Farah (Boho)
          - Wais Farah (Boho)
          - Sahal Farah (Boho)
          - Abdille Farah (Bah Farwiyo)
          - Ali Farah (Bah Farwiyo)
          - Iidle Farah (Bah Farwiyo) (Rer Iidle)
            - Osman Iidle
            - Mohamoud Iidle
            - Beyle Iidle
            - Arale Iidle
            - Mohamed Iidle
            - Abdi Iidle
            - Hussein Iidle
            - Geddi Iidle
            - Farah Iidle
            - Gullied Iidle
            - Hildid Iidle
          - Ahmed Farah (Bah Farwiyo)
            - Abdulle Ahmed
            - Hussein Ahmed
            - Hassan Ahmed
            - Ali Ahmed
