= 1945 Sheikh Bashir rebellion =

Revolt waged by Habr Je'lo tribesmen

1945 Sheikh Bashir Rebellion
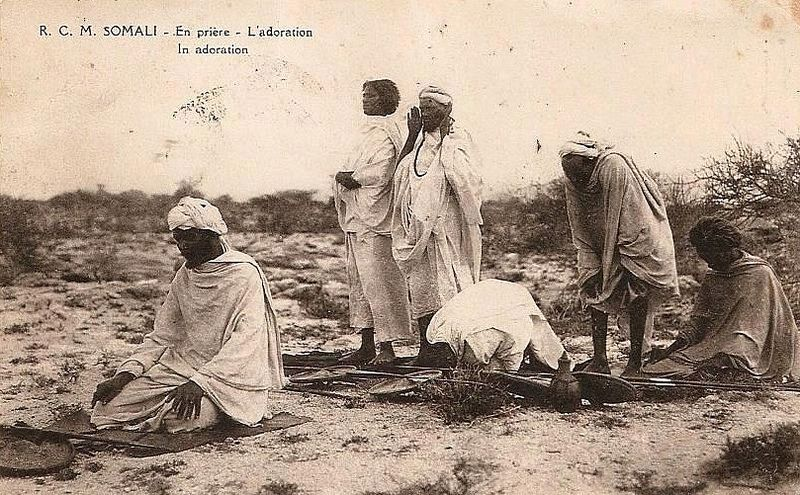
- Sheikh Bashir praying Sunnah prayer, 1920
Date	2–7 July 1945 (5 days)
Location	British Somaliland (now Somaliland)
Result	British victory: uprising suppressed; Anti-colonialist and nationalist sentiment increases in Somaliland

Belligerents
(Isaaq Sultanate) Isaaq Tribesmen: Habr Je'lo	United Kingdom: British Somaliland

Commanders and leaders
(Isaaq Sultanate) Sheikh Bashir (executed) (Isaaq Sultanate) Alin Yusuf Elmi †	(British Somaliland) Major James David Chambers † (British Somaliland) James David †

Units involved
Habr Je'lo tribesmen	Police guards, Sepoys and South African troops

Strength
25 armed followers	Unknown

Casualties and losses
2 killed, 3 captured	2 killed, several injured

The 1945 Sheikh Bashir Rebellion was a rebellion waged by tribesmen of the Habr Je'lo clan in the cities of Burao and Erigavo in the former British Somaliland colony and protectorate against British authorities in July 1945 led by Sheikh Bashir, an Isaaq religious leader. This rebellion occurred two months after the end of the Second World War in Europe, and post-war conditions, and the impending collapse of the British Empire, may have been the reasons for the rebellion in the first place.

== Background ==
The situation in the British Somaliland protectorate during the 1920s until the rebellion was tense. Several other revolts had taken place both in urban and rural areas in the protectorate during the time period between the rebellion and the defeat of the Dervish movement led by Mohammed Abdullah Hassan, the most serious of which was the 1922 Burao Tax Revolt led by tribesmen of the Rer Ainanshe sub-division of the Habr Yunis clan who refused attempts by the British authorities to tax them, and the 1944 Somaliland Camel Corps mutiny in response to the British authorities attempting to send the camel corps abroad to serve in other British colonies. During that time several organizations were formed that articulated and promoted Somali nationalism, such as the Somali Islamic Association led by Haji Farah Omar in 1920 in Aden.

Somalis feared European conquest of their land as early as the early 19th century, when in 1825 the Habr Awal Isaaq sacked a British merchant ship that had attempted to dock in the important trading port of Berbera, which lead to the British attack on Berbera in 1827 in response, as well as Somalis attacking British explorers on expeditions in Zeila, Berbera and Las Khorey. Another example of the Somali distrust of Europeans is when, in 1855, the governor of Zeila Haji Sharmarke refused to sell a house to a French agent in the town, and claimed that he preferred a significant loss over the presence of dangerous friends.

Yet another example of the distrust of the Europeans is when massive riots throughout the entire protectorate had taken place in 1945 in response to the British authorities putting poison bait in grazing lands as part of an anti-locust campaign aimed at combatting locust swarms. The violent demonstrations spread to different parts of the vast protectorate, from Zeila in the far west to Badhan in the far east.

== Overview ==
Sheikh Bashir was born in 1905 in Taleh, British Somaliland. Taleh was known as the Dervish capital and is located in the Sool region of Somaliland. Sheikh Bashir was a nephew of Mohammed Abdullah Hassan and was named by him. He hails from the Yeesif subclan of the Habr Je'lo Isaaq clan. Sheikh Bashir was cultivated at the Markaz (Centre) located in the village of Beer east of Burao and studied there in succession to his father. This Markaz was first established by Sheikh Bashir's grandfather Sheikh Hassan Fiqi Abdi as an educational centre where the Quran, hadith and other Islamic sciences were taught.

According to the Somali historian and novelist Farah Awl the Sayyid had a significant influence on Sheikh Bashir through listening to his poetry and conversations, an influence that impelled him to a "war with the British". After studying in the markaz in Beer he opened a Sufi tariqa (order) sometime in the 1930s, where he preached his ideology of anti-imperialism, stressing the evil of colonial rule and the bringing of radical change through war. His ideology was shaped by a millennial bent, which according to Marxist historian Eric Hobsbawm is the "hope of a complete and radical change in the world shorn of all its present deficiencies".

Sheikh Bashir had been arrested multiple times before the revolt itself had occurred for challenging the authority of the British protectorate. He reached prominence in 1939 when he played a prominent role in a riot in Burao that happened that year as a result of a new educational policy the British authorities had announced, and which it had put an end to after the riots. The British had also at the same time announced a new disarmament policy directed at armed pastoralists. In response, Sheikh Bashir organized a group of some hundred armed tribesmen and dared the British authorities to enforce the policy, which resulted in him being arrested at the end of 1939 and sentenced to a minor term of imprisonment. After his release he returned to his tariqa in Beer, where he continued to preach and encourage his followers to resist all policies of the British authorities. He continued to resist the British authorities through preaching until 1945, when he decided to take arms.

One day, according to a well known story, he challenged sheikhs who were fulminating against the British to actually do something about it. The exchange between Sheikh Bashir and the sheikhs was passed over into history in a poem composed by Yasin Ahmed Haji Nur in January 1980, Muruq Baa Dagaal Gala (Muscle Partakes in War), where he describes the incident:

Sheekh Bashiir ka daalaco
Wadaadii dikriyayee
daasada uu dhex keenee
ku daloosha uu yidhi
diinkay akhriyayeen
wax kastay du-dubiyaan
markay diisi waayeen
waa kii budh doontee
dam-dagiigan kaga dhigay
Dulucdeedu waxay tahay
muruq baa dagaal gala

— Yasin Ahmed Haji Nur, "Muruq Baa Dagaal Gala" (Muscle Parrakes in War)
Translation:

Take Sheikh Bashir as an example
The chanting priests
Among whom he placed a can
And asked them to break it
With the religious verses they wen reading
Mer they read everything
And failed to dent it
He took a big stick
And destroyed it with one swing.
The meaning of the story is
Muscle partakes in war

== Rebellion ==
On 2 July, Sheikh Bashir collected 25 of his followers in the town of Wadamago and transported them on a lorry to the vicinity of Burao, where he distributed arms to half of his followers. On the evening of 3 July the group entered Burao and opened fire on the police guard of the central prison in the city, which was filled with prisoners arrested for previous demonstrations. The group also attacked the house of the district commissioner of Burao District, Major Chambers, resulting in the death of Major Chamber's police guard. A party of 30 police were immediately mobilized and tasked with pursuing the group. Sheikh Bashir and his followers subsequently escaped to Bur Dhab, a strategic mountain south-east of Burao and north of Aynaba, where Sheikh Bashir's small unit occupied a fort and took up a defensive position in anticipation of a British counterattack.

The British campaign against Sheikh Bashir's troops proved abortive after several defeats as his forces kept moving from place to place and avoiding any permanent location. No sooner had the expedition left the area, than the news traveled fast among the Somali nomads across the plain. The war had exposed the British administration to humiliation. The government came to a conclusion that another expedition against him would be useless; that they must build a railway, make roads and effectively occupy the whole of the protectorate, or else abandon the interior completely. The latter course was decided upon, and during the first months of 1945, the advance posts were withdrawn and the British administration confined to the coast town of Berbera.

Sheikh Bashir settled many disputes among the tribes in the vicinity, which kept them from raiding each other. He was generally thought to settle disputes through the use of Islamic Sharia and gathered around him a strong following.

=== Erigavo revolt ===
Sheikh Bashir sent a message to religious figures in the town of Erigavo and called on them to revolt and join the rebellion he led. The religious leaders as well as the people of Erigavo heeded his call, and mobilized a substantial number of people in Erigavo armed with rifles and spears and staged a revolt. The British authorities responded rapidly and severely, sending reinforcements to the town and opening fire on the armed mobs in two "local actions" as well as arresting minor religious leaders in the town.

== Death of Sheikh Bashir ==
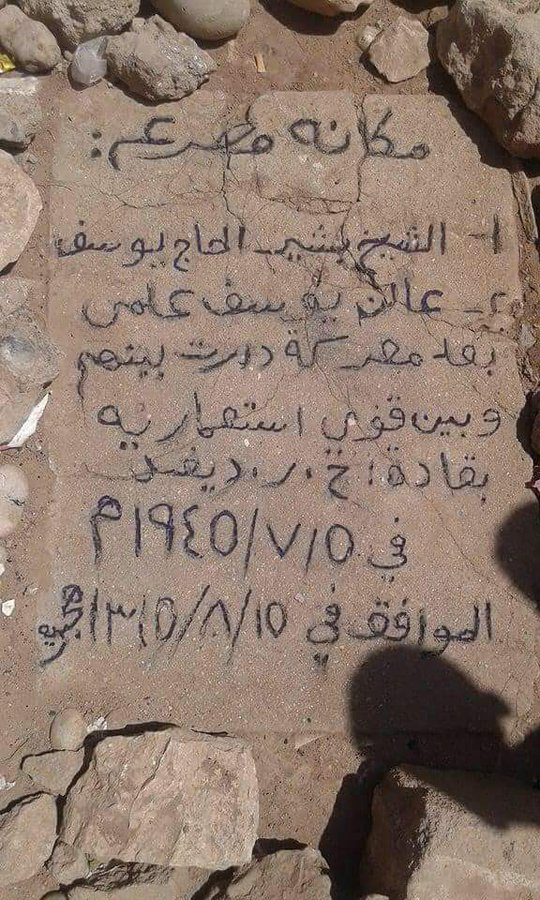
Site of the death of Sheikh Bashir

The British administration recruited Indian and South African troops, led by police general James David, to fight against Sheikh Bashir and had intelligence plans to capture him alive. The British authorities mobilized a police force, and eventually on 7 July found Sheikh Bashir and his unit in defensive positions behind their fortifications in the mountains of Bur Dhab. After clashes Sheikh Bashir and his second-in-command, Alin Yusuf Elmi, nicknamed Qaybdiid, were killed. A third rebel was wounded and was captured along with two other rebels. The rest fled the fortifications and dispersed. On the British side the police general leading the British troops as well as a number of Indian and South African troops perished in the clashes, and a policeman was injured.

After his death, Sheikh Bashir was widely hailed by locals as a martyr and was held in great reverence. His family took quick action to remove his body from the place of his death at Geela-eeg mountain, about 20 miles from Burao.

== Aftermath ==
Despite the death of Sheikh Bashir and his second-in-command, the British authorities were not finished with the rebels and continued its counter-insurgency campaign. The authorities had quickly learned the names and identities of all the followers of Sheikh Bashir and tried to convince the locals to turn them in. When they refused, the authorities invoked the Collective Punishment Ordinance, under which the authorities seized and impounded a total of 6,000 camels owned by the Habr Je'lo, the clan that Sheikh Bashir belonged to. The British authorities made the return of the livestock dependent on the turning over and arrest of the escaped rebels. The remaining rebels were subsequently found and arrested, and transported to the Saad-ud-Din archipelago, off the coast of Zeila in northwestern Somaliland. Despite the death of Sheikh Bashir and his followers resistance against British authorities continued in Somaliland, especially in Erigavo where his death stirred further resistance in the town and the town of Badhan and lead to attacks on British colonial troops throughout the district and the seizing of arms from the rural constabulary.

== Legacy ==
Sheikh Bashir appears as a significant figure in Somali popular culture, this is seen in references to his life and struggle in Somali poetry, with many poems describing his rebellion and calling on local Somalis to avenge him. In Raqdii Bashiir (The Corpse of Bashir), a poem composed by the famous Habr Yunis poet Haji Adan Ahmed Af-Qallooc (Somali: Xaaji Aadan Axmed Af-Qallooc), he describes the aftermath of Sheikh Bashir's death and the British mistreatment of his body, and called on the people to continue the rebellion, and to avenge Sheikh Bashir and his followers as well as warning them of British settlers taking over the land, something which the British authorities denied and which led to his arrest for attempting to re-ignite the rebellion. In the poem, he said:

Duhur baa Bashiir lagu shanaqay, daar agtiina ah ehe,
Dahriga iyo laabtay rasaas, kaga daloosheene,
Isaga oo dem iyo dhiig leh, oo maro ku duu-duuban,
Dacsad iyo ahaaniyo cag baa, loogu sii daraye.
Dadkii uu nebcaa iyo kufirga, daawashou yimide,
Meydkii oo Daahir ahayn, markii debedda loo tuuray,
Ee aaska loo diiday, waad wada dul joogteene

Dar kaloo ciyaar lagu dilay iyo, dawgal baa jirey e,
Oo aanyay deero deero u hirdiyin, dadab galkoodiiye.
Ma duugoobin Qaybdiid, lafuhu waana duhanayaane
Da'dii u ahaa baa Faarax, jeelka loo diraye
Imminkuu siduu dawri yahay, debedda meeraaye
Loo diid dadkii uu dhaliyo, duunyaduu dhaqaye
Dad oo idil soo eri, ninkii daalinka ahaaye

Ingriis wuxuu dooni jirey, reer Hindiya diidye,
Daarihii Banjaab iyo ka kace, dahabkii hoos yiile,
Daymada hadeeray indhuhu, dib u jaleecaane.
Damaashaadku waa Maxamed Cali, loo dabaal degay e.
Waa duubey Faransiis, dhulkii Suuriyuu degey e.
Daristii Lubnaan iyo ka kace, degelkii Beyruute

Dekedaha maraakiib shixnadan, baa ka soo degeye,
Daadxoorta oo idil, halkanaa lala damcaayaaye,
Halka daawad xeradeedu tahay, gaaladaa degiye,
Nin daymud iyo gaadhi laa, beer idiin dirane,
Durgufkiina soo hadhay, waxaan doonayuu garane

— Aden Ahmed "Af-Qallooc", "Sheekh Bashiir" in Suugaanta: Dugsiga Sare: Fasalka Labaad (Mogadisho: Madbacada Qaranka, n.d.), pp.49-50
Translation:

Sheikh Bashir was hanged in day-light, at a house
near you,
With bullets, they made holes on his chest,
While his body was covered with blood,
They also kicked him, and insulted him.
Worst the people whom he hated and the infidels, came to watch him
When the unwashed body was thrown outside,
And refused burial, you were all around him

There were others killed playfully,
About which nothing was done.
The body of Qayb-diid is still warm, and
his bones are still wet.
Though an old man, Farah (Farah Omar) was sent to jail.
And now he roams the outside world.
They refused him rights over his family and wealth.
The unjust man (British) are punishing everybody.
What the English always wanted, the people of India refused.
The houses of Bunjab and the gold that they contained has been
denied to them (the British)
Now they look back at them with nostalgia

The celebration are for Muhammad Ali (Egypt).
And the French are leaving Syria that they conquered.
They withdrew from Beirut, and Lebanon.
Many ships will arrive at (our) ports,
They will bring here (Somaliland) those thrown out
by the stream of shit
The place were you pasture Daawad (she-camel), the infidels will settle,
A man on a car and an airplane, will force you
to work on his farms,
The few who survive that, will then know what I want (today)

Adan Ahmed Af-Qallooc also composed another poem in Sheikh Bashir's honour, titled Gobonimo (Freedom). In it, he said:

Samaan laguma doonee xornimo, wa sange u fuule
Sallax dakhar leh, Meyd soobiriyo, seedo waran gooya
Soofkoo la kala qaado, iyo siigo kor u duusha
Haweenkoo gambada saydha, iyo sebi agoomooba

Iyo libintu waxay saaran tahay, suluf coladeede
Salliga iyo Allahu Akbartay, siri ka buuxadaye
Sawaarikhda waxa nooga dhigan, Suurtal Ikhlaase
Naftuna saacad bay leedahoon, abid la seegayne

Siyaadiyo Nuqsaan laguma daro, suu Ilaah yidhiye
kuwo saymihii nabad galaa, seexday oo go'a e
Saxarba waa dilaa niman wakhtiga, sed ugu laabnayne
Geesiga senaad weyn leh, iyo fulaha seeraara
Geerida u siman Sharafna, way kala Sarreeyaane

Safka ninka ka baqa ee warmaha sugi aqoon waaya
Saldhigiisu akhirana waa, sakhara nareede
gobonimo sun baa kaa xigtoo, laysma siin karo'e
Waa Sarac ku baxa dhiig ragoo, lagu Sadqeeyaaye

Sarakaca, Kufrigu wa Sasabo, suu na leeyahaye

— Aden Ahmed "Af-Qallooc", "Gobonimo"
Translation:

Freedom is never attained with ease
Nor with indifferent chit-chat
It is never bestowed without struggle
And it never recognizes the man that was not hurt for it

Fire and heat surround it
It wants you to go through that and appear somewhere on the other side
The desire and struggle are for posterity to remember
This place (jail) has been prepared for men

It hots only feared world-historical figures
A man like me never complains about it
Only children and women fear it
Haytin and Gandhi were here

The hero Nakruma and Jamal slept here
The chain and iron were not moulded for women
But for men who refuse subjection
This ugly blanket (upon which we sit) is better than the best Persian carpet

We must never complain

Sheikh Bashir's rebellion can also be credited for contributing to the rise of balwo and heello, two famous styles of music and poetry practiced in modern-day Somaliland as well as Djibouti. Anti-colonial poets that arose after his rebellion played a crucial role in the anti-colonial nationalist movement, as famous poet Hadrawi maintained in his poem, "The Poet".

Two secondary schools in Hargeisa and Burao, both called the Sheikh Bashir Secondary School, are named in his honour.

== See also ==
- Farah Omar
- Deria Arale
- Abdallah Shihiri
