= Mohamed Nur Fadal =

Somali poet (1885–1949)

Mohamed Nur Fadal Maxamed Nuur Fadal محمد نور فضل
- Born: 1885; Berbera, British Somaliland (now Somaliland)
- Died: 1949 (aged 63–64); Eastleigh, British Kenya (now Kenya)
- Occupation: Poet

Mohamed Nur Fadal (Somali: Maxamed Nuur Fadal, Arabic: محمد نور فضل) was a Somali poet, soldier, and entrepreneur, widely recognized for his contributions to Somali poetry. He belongs to the Reer Dahir subclan of the Habr Je'lo Isaaq.

== Life ==
Mohamed Nur Fadal was born in 1885 in Berbera in modern-day Somaliland. He is the grandson of Sheekh Ismail Jama Egal (nicknamed Fadal), an Islamic scholar and religious leader who lived in the Guban region, particularly Hagal and the eastern coastal areas of Berbera. In the early 1900s, Mohamed Nur Fadal and his younger brother, Farah Nur Fadal, were recruited to fight in the First Boer War. At the time of his enlistment, Mohamed was under 20 years old. Mohamed also fought in World War I.

The recruits were marched to the port of Mombasa for deployment. During their journey, they composed poetry reflecting their hopes and fears, some of which remain part of collective Somali oral history. A skilled poet, he was a notable figure and participant in the most famous chain of Somali poetry known as the Guba series in which legendary Isaaq and Darood poets traded boastful and sharp verses.

Following World War I, Mohamed settled in the town of Thika, approximately 40 kilometers north of Nairobi, Kenya, and transitioned into trade. Within a short time, he became one of the wealthiest entrepreneurs in East Africa. His wealth is attributed to his discovery of diamonds near Thika, which he sold to a prominent Indian merchant. In Thika, he built the first mosque, now known as the Mohamed Nur Mosque, which remains a landmark. He also established a commercial center that included over twenty shops.

== Death ==
Mohamed Nur Fadal died in 1949 in Eastleigh, Nairobi, where he is buried.
