= Abdi Awad Ali =

Somali business tycoon (1943–2006)

Haji Abdi Awad Ali
- Cabdi Cawad Cali عبدي عوض علي
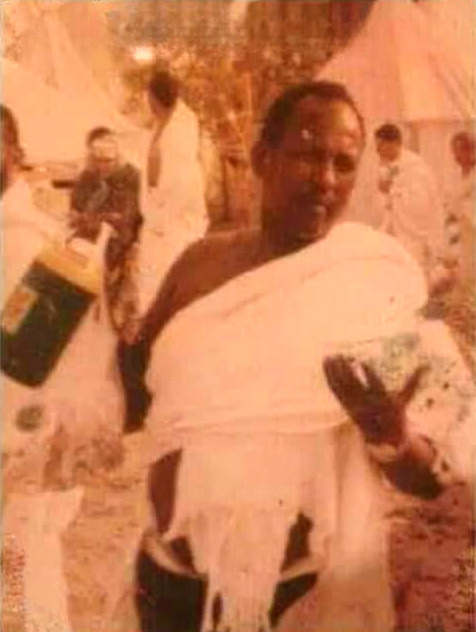
- Abdi Awad Ali performing Umrah
- Born: 1943; Ainabo, British Somaliland (now Somaliland)
- Died: July 6, 2006 (aged 62–63); Burao, Somaliland
- Other name: Indhadeero
- Occupation: Businessman
- Years active: 1955-2006
- Organization: Indhadeero Group of Companies
- Known for: CEO

Haji Abdi Awad Ali (Somali: Xaaji Cabdi Cawad Cali, Arabic: عبدي عوض علي), more commonly known as Indhadeero was a Somali entrepreneur and the founder and former CEO of Indhadeero Group of Companies. He was known as the wealthiest businessperson in Burao and one of the most notorious Somali entrepreneurs.

== Biography ==
Haji Abdi Awad Ali was born in 1943 in Ainabo, then British Somaliland, to a family of pastoral nomads consisting of two girls and three boys. Haji Abdi belonged to the Rer Yunis sub-division of the Habr Je'lo clan, part of the wider Isaaq clan-family. At the ages of 7 and 8 Haji Abdi was orphaned as both his parents died, which later on prompted Haji Abdi to move to Burao at the age of 12 to make a living.

== Career ==
In Burao Haji Abdi started his business career at the lowest level, selling small items such as matches, scissors, needles and cigarettes, however as his profits increased he founded Indhadeero Group of Companies in 1960, and later began importing goods from Hargeisa and Berbera in 1962 to sell in Burao, connecting with many members of the business community on the way. In 1967 Haji Abdi opened his first three stores in Burao, and then proceeded to open a hawala store in 1972, mainly facilitating the transfer of funds between Somaliland and guest workers in the Gulf. Indhadeero Group became one of two major Somali trading companies that flourished during the 1970s oil boom and emerged as major players in the domestic economy, the other one being Dahabshiil.

By 1983 Haji Abdi's company expanded, exporting livestock and importing foodstuff, clothes, building materials, auto spare parts, among other essential goods.

As the Somaliland War of Independence was in its infancy the Siad Barre regime started harassing the local Isaaq population of the north. Haji Abdi was arrested and sentenced to death in December 1984, along with 44 other victims standing accused of association with the SNM. At the last minute, however, Haji Abdi and another businessman from Burao were spared due to the size of the loans they owed the banks.

In 1992 local Berbera Habr Je'lo traders led by Haji Abdi started to build facilities and use the natural harbour of El Gerde (23 km east of Berbera) to import and export their goods and livestock. In 2002 he was the leading businessperson in use of the port of Berbera. By 2004, Haji Abdi was among a handful of Isaaq businessmen who held a monopoly over the import-export business in Somaliland, with Haji Abdi being the largest importer of building material, fueling Somaliland's reconstruction after the war, as well as being the largest exporter of mutton to Saudi Arabia, later on becoming a market leader in the livestock export sector. By 2005–2006, his company was estimated to be worth over $280 million.

== Death and legacy ==
Haji Abdi died on 6 July 2006 in Burao, Somaliland. His company, Indhadeero Group of Companies, is currently managed by his sons. The company owns Deero Mall, one of the largest malls in Hargeisa, Somaliland's capital.
