= Osman Dubbe =

Somali professor and politician

Osman Abokor Dubbe
- Cismaan Abokor Dubbe
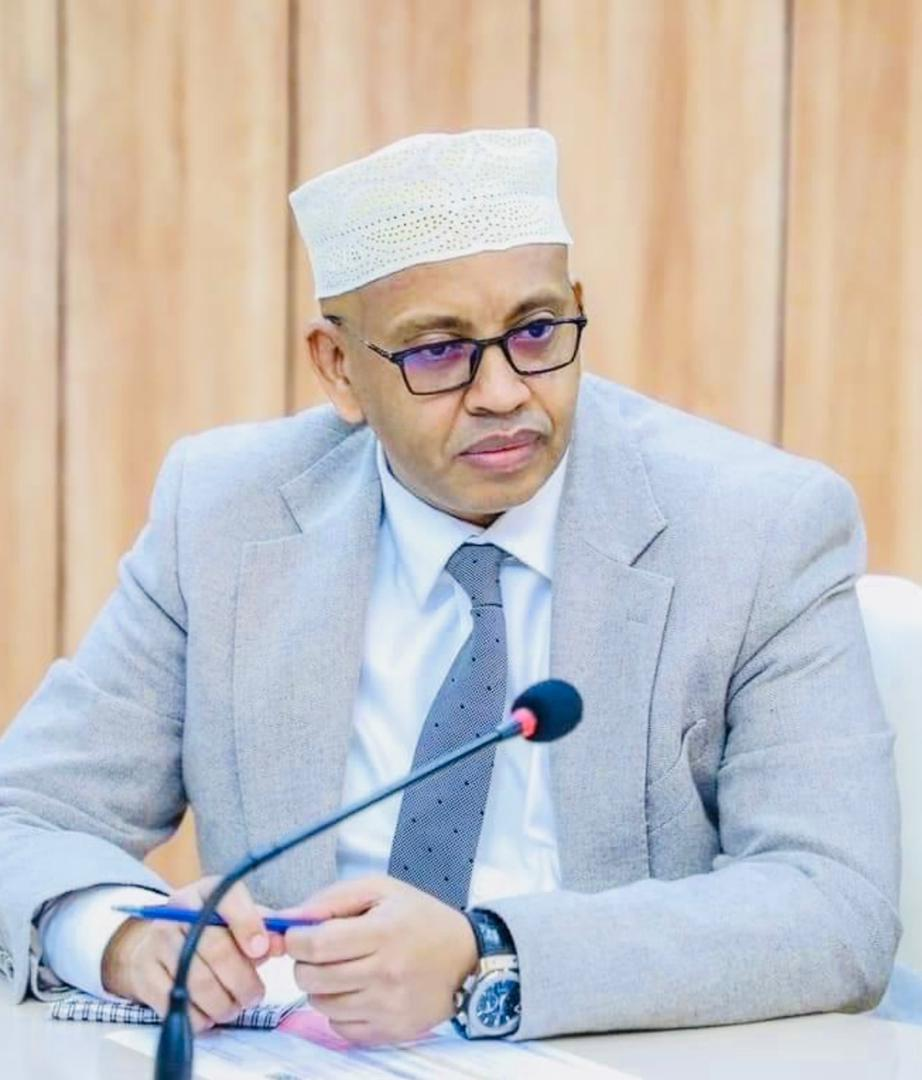

Personal details
- Born: March 1979 (age 46–47) Shanshacade, Togdheer, Somaliland
- Party: Hiiloow
- Education: Masters of Law (LLM) from the University of East London
- Occupation: Minister of Information, Culture and Tourism - Somalia

Osman Abokor Dubbe (Somali: Cismaan Abokor Dubbe) is a Somali author, professor, and politician. He was the former Minister of Information, Culture and Tourism of Federal Government of Somalia. Currently he is a Senator of the Somali Parliament. He belongs to the Ahmed Farah sub-division of the Habr Je'lo Isaaq.

== Personal life ==
Dubbe is former minister of Information, Culture and Tourism of Federal Government of Somalia. He was born March 1979 in Shanshacade, a small village near Burao, the provincial capital of the Togdheer region in Somaliland. Studied in his early education 1da Maajo Primary School and Kaasa-Balbalaare Secondary School in Mogadishu, Somalia. Later he become a teacher in Secondary Schools.

In October 1998, Dubbe joined the Tower Hamlets College in London from which he graduated and was awarded a diploma in political science in July 2000. In June 2003 Dubbe graduated from the University of Westminster in which he specialized in a political science major. In September 2006, he got his certificate in Masters of Law (LLM) from the University of East London. Dubee is fluent in several languages including Somali, and English.

== Career ==
In September 1999, the professor became one of the first founders of one of the first political parties in Somaliland called Ilays and he became the first Chairman of that party.

In the beginning of 2008, Osman Abokor once again became one of the founders and organizers of the HANOOLAATO political party whose purpose was to unite, reconcile and bring back Greater Somalia and he became the first leader of the HANOOLAATO party. In his time of leadership in the HANOOLAATO party, he promoted membership and disseminated party ideas.

In the years Dubbe was in the UK, he was a community worker and a law advisor in immigration. He was a research assistant in a research project on elderly people from minority groups in the UK by LSC University. In 2003, He founded a magazine called Ocean Somali Voice, which was written in both English and Somali language.

In December 2011, the International Organization for Migration (IOM) hired Dubbe as an expert for Legal Drafting to Somali Institutions and training staff. His first assignment was to the Ministry of Justice in Somaliland, which he worked with until 2013. In his second phase, he began work in Mogadishu specifically in the Ministry of Justice and Constitutional Affairs, which he worked in 2014 and 2015. During that time, the expert wrote many rules that were passed by the parliaments of both Somaliland and the federal government of Somalia, including Judiciary Service Council's Act, Anti Corruption Law, judiciary Law, Public Notary Law and may more.

In the years 2012 to 2018, Dubbe was a university lecturer. He also became a dean of the college of Social and Political Science in Golis University, Hargeisa. He also went on teacher visits to Hargeisa University, Abaarso University, Tech University as well as Buroa Golis Universities. Dubbe also visit regularly Simad and City Universities in Mogadishu.

In the beginning of 2020, Dubbe founded a political party called Peace, Unity and Prosperity Party (Hilow Party) in which he wanted his party to receive parliamentary approval of being able to run for higher seats in the country but was affected by the Dhuusamareeb conference which was agreed that political parties won't be participating in the 2021 elections.

On October 19, 2020, Somali prime minister Mohamed Hussein Roble appointed Dubbe as Federal Minister for Information, Culture and Tourism for his new government

== Writings ==
Dubbe wrote two books that were (Felegmeer) in the year 2009 that talked about the political mistakes that led to the destruction of Somalia, the state of unity and the togetherness of Somali people and his second book that he wrote about his poetry and collected about a hundred (100) poems and others that he composed. This book is currently in print and its called Mangalool literature (Suuganta Mangalool)
