= Ibrahim Boghol =

Somali military leader

- Ibraahim Bogol إبراهيم بغُل
- Born: 1877; Wadaamagoo, Cayn Region
- Died: February 1920 (aged 42–43); Taleh, Somaliland
- Organization: Dervish movement

Ibrahim Hassan Boghol (Somali: Ibraahim Xasan Buqul; 1877 – February 1920) was a Somali military leader. He was a member of the Dervish council, called the Khusuusi, and was also the commander of the northern Dervish army. He was among the most wanted Dervish leaders in British Somaliland. Boghol hailed from the Adan Madobe sub-division of the Habr Je'lo clan of the Isaaq clan family.

== Siege of Las Khoray ==
In late April 1916, the Warsangeli under the orders of Mohamoud Ali Shire attacked the Dervish forces based at the Jidali fort, besieging them and looting their stock. With news of the assault having reached the Dervish of Cershida and Surut, reinforcements were sent to Jidali to repulse the attackers, where the Warsangeli were defeated and the Dervishes managed to recover their stock. On the evening of Saturday the 6th, the Dervishes set out to punish the Warsangeli with a force composed of 2,000 Sa'ad Yunis and Uduruhmin Dervishes led by Boghol who swept down on the Warsangeli capital, Las Khorey. Boghol's forces captured the eastern portion of the town, killing many Warsangeli fighters. The force managed to surround the settlement and capture the only source of water, causing many to die of thirst. While Las Khorey was being besieged, the Warsangeli were able to secretly send a dhow to Aden to request help from the British Navy, and on May 10 Lancelot Turton commanding HMS Northbrook arrived at Las Khorey and commenced to shell Boghol and his forces with Lyddite explosives, forcing them to retreat to the mountains and thus ending the deadly siege.

== Death ==
Once the British initiated the aerial bombardments of the Sanaag Forts in late January 1920, Boghol evacuated the Dervish forces and concentrated them at Taleh. Boghol was killed in a battle against the British outside the walls of Taleh in February 1920.

== See also ==
- Haji Sudi
- Mohammed Abdullah Hassan
- Nur Ahmed Aman
- Abdallah Shihiri
- Deria Arale
