= Beer, Togdheer =

Beer
- Town
- Location in Somaliland Beer (Somaliland)
- Coordinates: 9°21′49″N 45°44′06″E
- Country: Somaliland
- Region: Togdheer
- District: Burao District
- Time zone: UTC+3 (EAT)

Beer is a village in Burao District, in the Togdheer region of Somaliland. It is located 30 kilometres (19 mi) south-east by road from Burao.

== Overview ==
The town of Beer is located 30 kilometres (19 mi) south-east by road from Burao.

=== Drought ===
Between 1974 and 1975, a major drought, referred to as the Abaartii Dabadheer ("The Lingering Drought") occurred in modern-day Somaliland and the neighbouring northern Puntland region of Somalia. The Soviet Union, which at the time maintained strategic relations with the Siad Barre government, airlifted around 90,000 people from the devastated regions of Aynaba and the towns of Beer and Hobyo. New small settlements, referred to as Danwadaagaha ("Collective Settlements") were then created in Jubbada Hoose (Lower Jubba) and Jubbada Dhexe (Middle Jubba) regions. The transplanted families were also introduced to farming and fishing techniques, a change from their traditional pastoralist lifestyle of livestock herding.

== Notable residents ==
- Salaan Carrabey — notorious Somali poet
- Sheikh Bashir — Somali religious leader famed for leading the 1945 Sheikh Bashir Rebellion
- Mohamed Kahin Ahmed — Minister of Interior of Somaliland

== See also ==
- Administrative divisions of Somaliland
- Regions of Somaliland
- Districts of Somaliland
