= Mohamed Abokor =

Somali clan

Maxamed Abokor محمد أبو بكر
- Ethiopia Djibouti Somaliland Kenya Yemen

Regions with significant populations
- Ethiopia, Djibouti, Somaliland, Kenya, Yemen

Languages
- Somali, Arabic

Religion
- Islam

Related ethnic groups
- Habr Je'lo clans, and other Isaaq

The Mohamed Abokor (Somali: Maxamed Abokor, Arabic: بني محمد بن أبو بكر full name: Muḥammad ibn Abī Bakr ibn Jibrīl ibn Abī Bakr ibn Mūsa ibn ash-Shaykh Isḥāq ibn Aḥmad) is a Somali clan, and a major sub-division of the Habr Je'lo of the Isaaq.

The Mohamed Abokor are one of the largest sub-divisions of the Habr Je'lo. They inhabit the Togdheer, Sool and Sahil regions of Somaliland, in addition to the Somali Region of Ethiopia and Isiolo, Kenya, where they form part of the Isahakia community. Notable subclans include Aadan Madoobe, Yeesif, Reer Daahir, Solomadow and Ahmed Farah.

== Overview ==
Members of the subclan are descendants of Mohamed Abokor, the great-great-great-grandson of Sheikh Ishaaq bin Ahmed. The full name of the subclan is Muḥammad ibn Abū Bakr ibn Jibrīl ibn Abū Bakr ibn Mūsa ibn ash-Shaykh Ishaaq ibn Aḥmad. They are well known for greatly participating in the Dervish movement led by Sayyid Mohammed Abdullah Hassan as well as the 1945 Sheikh Bashir Rebellion led by the religious leader Sheikh Bashir of the Yeesif subclan.

Historically, the Mohamed Abokor were chiefly nomadic pastoralists, whereas the Musa Abokor and Omar obtained much of their wealth via their frankincense plantations in the mountainous interior adjacent to the coastline.

== History ==
=== Lineage ===
Sheikh Ishaaq ibn Ahmed was one of the Arabian scholars that crossed the sea from Arabia to the Horn of Africa to spread Islam around 12th to 13th century. Hence, Shiekh Ishaaq married two local women in Somaliland that left him eight sons, one of them being Musa (Habr Je'lo). The descendants of those eight sons constitute the Isaaq clan-family.

=== 19th century ===
The Habr Je’lo coastal settlements and ports, stretching from Siyara in the west to Heis (Xiis) in the east, were important to trade and communication with the Somali interior. While the settlements were not as significant as the more established ports of Berbera, Zeila and Bulhar (respectively), the principle Mohamed Abokor port of Kurrum (Karin) was a major market for livestock and frankincense procured from the interior, and was a favorite for livestock traders due to the close proximity of the port to Aden. Habr Je’lo traders acted as middlemen to Dhulbahante livestock herders in the interior by purchasing and/or bartering their stock for export to the Aden market:

“The last branch of the Western tribes is the Haber el Jahleh, who possess the sea-ports from Seyareh to the ruined village of Rukudah, and as far as the town of Heis. Of these towns, Kurrum is the most important, from its possessing a tolerable harbour, and from its being the nearest point from Aden, the course to which place is N.N.W., consequently the wind is fair, and the boats laden with sheep for the Aden market pass but one night at sea, whilst those from Berbera are generally three. What greatly enhances the value of Kurrum however is its proximity to the country of the Dulbahanta, who approach within four days of Kurrum, and who therefore naturally have their chief trade through that port.

=== Anti-Colonial Movements ===
==== Dervish movement ====
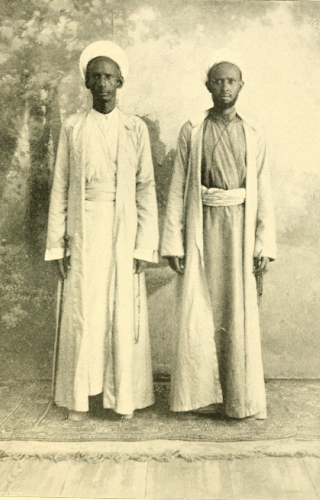
Haji Sudi on the left with his brother in-law Duale Idres. Aden, 1892.

The Mohammed Abokor subclan of the Habr Je’lo were one of the first clans in the Somaliland Protectrate to revolt against the Colonial government between the late 19th and early 20th centuries. Among their prominent anti-colonial ideologues during the Dervish period were Yuusuf haji hassan Deria Arale, Abdallah Shihiri, Ibrahim Boghol and Haji Sudi, the latter is credited for importing Dervish customs into the Somali peninsula as well as being one of the original founders of the Somali Dervish Movement. Moreover, the Habr Je'lo played an influential role after the demise of the Dervish Movement in 1920, with Sheikh Bashir Yussuf and Farah Omar being important anti-colonial notables.

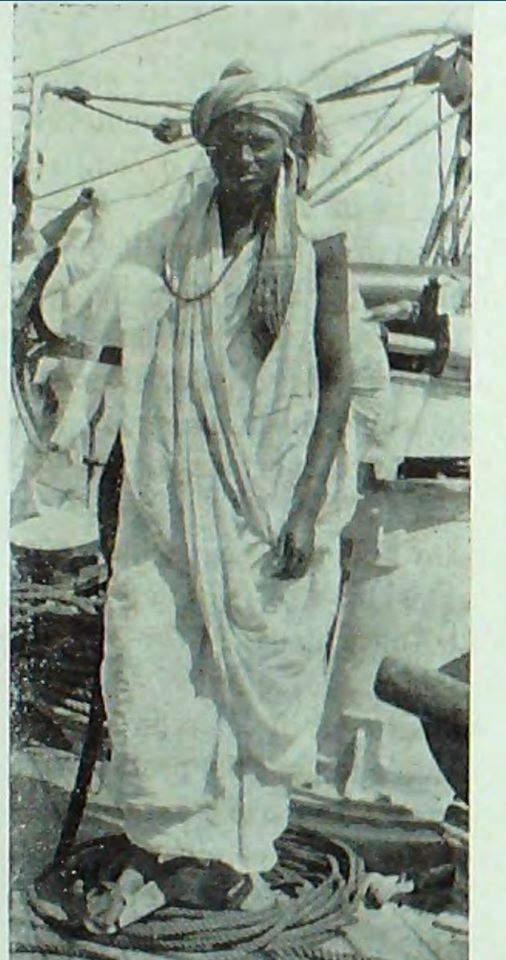
Abdallah Shihiri, 1909

The Dervish movement first arose in Burao in 1899, where in the summer of that year Dervish leaders and their clan followers congregated at the settlement. Haji Suudi leading his clansmen declared war on the British lest they stop interfering with their religious and internal affairs. The dervish then proceeded to send this letter to Captain Cordeauxe and James Hayes Sadler:

This is to inform you that you have done whatever you have desired, and oppressed our well-known religion without any cause. Further, to inform you that whatever people bring to you they are liars and slanderers. Further, to inform you that Mahomed, your Akil, came to ask from us the arms we therefore, send you this letter. Now choose for yourself; if you want war we accept it, if you want peace pay the fine." September 1, 1899.

According to the British War Office, the Ahmed Farah, Rer Yusuf and Adan Madoba Habr Je'lo sub-clans were among the first to join the Dervish rebellion. Haji Sudi, along with Mohammed Abdullah Hassan and Sultan Nur led the first Dervish forces against the British at Samala, Ferdidin, Erigo and Gumburu. Moreover, The coastal Habr Je'lo sub-clans provided significant armaments to the Dervish forces in the interior. Before sending troops to confront the Dervish at Samala, Consul-General Hayes Sadler gave the following instructions to the commander Eric John Eagles Swayne:

In the unlikely event of the Mullah offering to surrender, in his case and that of the Following: Haji Sudi, Deria Arale, Deria Gure Only an unconditional surrender should be accepted no guarantee of any kind to future treatment been given. Sultan Nur, the Sultan of the Habr Yunis, may be guaranteed his life." J. Hayes-Sadler, His Britannic Majesty's Consul-General, Somali Coast Protectorate. Aden April 11, 1901."

Although facing the British in multiple battles between 1901 and 1904, the colonial forces failed to in their efforts to apprehend Sudi, Arale, Gure and their fellow Dervishes. Gabriel Ferrand, the Vice-Consul of France following these events observed that:

Neither the Mahdi nor his chief adviser Ahmed Warsama, better known under the name Haji Sudi, nor the Sultan Nur, leader of the Habr Younis clan were killed or captured. The optimism of Colonel Sadler and Lieutenant-Colonel Swayne in the latest reports relating to military operations is inexplicable."

Abdalah Shihiri and Deria Arale led the 1904 Dervish delegation that facilitated the Ilig or Pestollaza agreement between the Dervish and Italy. This treaty allowed the Dervishes to peacefully settle in Italian Somaliland with some autonomy.

In 1920, the British air force commenced their bombardment of Dervish fort and their ground assault on Taleh fort. Haji Sudi, the highest ranking Dervish after Mohammed Abdullah Hassan and Ibrahim Boghol, commander of the northern Dervish army died valiantly defending the Taleh.

==== 1945 Sheikh Bashir Rebellion ====
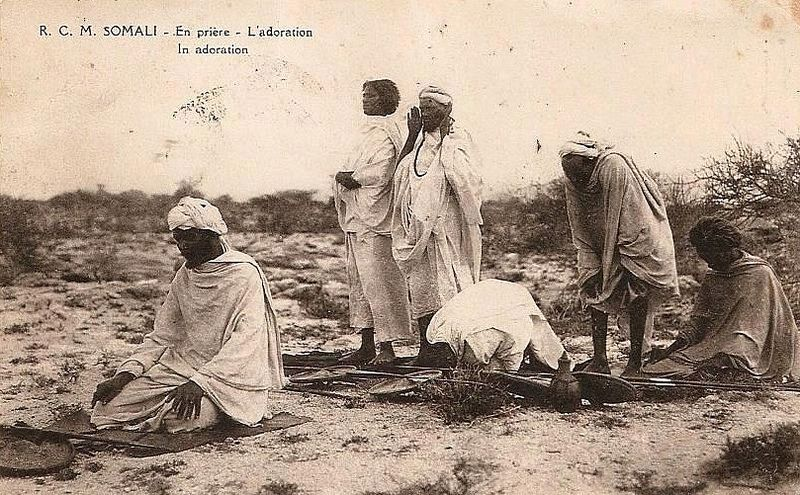
Sheikh Bashir praying Sunnah prayer, 1920

The 1945 Sheikh Bashir Rebellion was a rebellion waged by tribesmen of the Habr Je'lo clan in the cities of Burao and Erigavo in the former British Somaliland protectorate against British authorities in July 1945 led by Sheikh Bashir, a Somali religious leader belonging to the Yeesif sub-division.

On 2 July, Sheikh Bashir collected 25 of his followers in the town of Wadamago and transported them on a lorry to the vicinity of Burao, where he distributed arms to half of his followers. On the evening of 3 July the group entered Burao and opened fire on the police guard of the central prison in the city, which was filled with prisoners arrested for previous demonstrations. The group also attacked the house of the district commissioner of Burao District, Major Chambers, resulting in the death of Major Chamber's police guard before escaping to Bur Dhab, a strategic mountain south-east of Burao, where Sheikh Bashir's small unit occupied a fort and took up a defensive position in anticipation of a British counterattack.

The British campaign against Sheikh Bashir's troops proved abortive after several defeats as his forces kept moving from place to place and avoiding any permanent location. No sooner had the expedition left the area, than the news traveled fast among the Somali nomads across the plain. The war had exposed the British administration to humiliation. The government came to a conclusion that another expedition against him would be useless; that they must build a railway, make roads and effectively occupy the whole of the protectorate, or else abandon the interior completely. The latter course was decided upon, and during the first months of 1945, the advance posts were withdrawn and the British administration confined to the coast town of Berbera.

Sheikh Bashir settled many disputes among the tribes in the vicinity, which kept them from raiding each other. He was generally thought to settle disputes through the use of Islamic Sharia and gathered around him a strong following.

Sheikh Bashir sent a message to religious figures in the town of Erigavo and called on them to revolt and join the rebellion he led. The religious leaders as well as the people of Erigavo heeded his call, and mobilized a substantial number of people in Erigavo armed with rifles and spears and staged a revolt. The British authorities responded rapidly and severely, sending reinforcements to the town and opening fire on the armed mobs in two "local actions" as well as arresting minor religious leaders in the town.

The British administration recruited Indian and South African troops, led by police general James David, to fight against Sheikh Bashir and had intelligence plans to capture him alive. The British authorities mobilized a police force, and eventually on 7 July found Sheikh Bashir and his unit in defensive positions behind their fortifications in the mountains of Bur Dhab. After clashes Sheikh Bashir and his second-in-command, Alin Yusuf Ali, nicknamed Qaybdiid, were killed. A third rebel was wounded and was captured along with two other rebels. The rest fled the fortifications and dispersed. On the British side the police general leading the British troops as well as a number of Indian and South African troops perished in the clashes, and a policeman was injured.

Despite the death of Sheikh Bashir and his followers resistance against British authorities continued in Somaliland, especially in Erigavo where his death stirred further resistance in the town and the town of Badhan and lead to attacks on British colonial troops throughout the district and the seizing of arms from the rural constabulary.

Despite the death of Sheikh Bashir and his second-in-command, the British authorities was not finished with the rebels and continued its counter-insurgency campaign. The authorities had quickly learned the names and identities of all the followers of Sheikh Bashir and tried to convince the locals to turn them in. When they refused, the authorities invoked the Collective Punishment Ordinance, under which the authorities seized and impounded a total of 6,000 camels owned by the Habr Je'lo, the clan that Sheikh Bashir belonged to. The British authorities made the return of the livestock dependent on the turning over and arrest of the escaped rebels. The remaining rebels were subsequently found and arrested, and transported to the Saad-ud-Din archipelago, off the coast of Zeila in northwestern Somaliland.

== Clan tree ==
Below is a breakdown of the different sub-divisions of the Mohamed Abokor subclan:

- Sheikh Ishaaq Bin Ahmed (Sheikh Ishaaq)
  - Muse bin Ishaaq
          - Mohamed Abokor
            - Adan Mohamed (Adan Madoba)
            - Yesif Mohamed
            - Nuh Mohamed
                - Abdille
                  - Abokor Abdille (Solomadow)
                  - Hassan Abdille (Solomadow)
                  - Barre Abdille (Solomadow)
                    - Samatar Barre
                    - Ahmed Barre
                    - Kul Barre
                    - Nabad Barre
                  - Hussein Abdille
                  - Allamagan Abdille
                  - Farah Abdille
                    - Beila Farah
                    - Fahiye Farah
                    - Dahir Farah (Rer Dahir)
                      - Ahmed Dahir
                      - Nuh Dahir
                      - Guled Dahir
                      - Kalil Dahir
                      - Barre Dahir
                      - Ogal Dahir
                      - Hassan Dahir
                      - Wa'ays Dahir
                      - Yusuf Dahir
                      - Ibrahim Dahir
                      - Hildid Dahir
                      - Adan Dahir
                      - Omar Dahir
                        - Abokor Omar
                        - Muse Omar
                        - Bah Abdirahman
                        - Bah Eise
                          - Ismail Omar
                            - Yusuf Ismail (Rer Yusuf)
                    - Ahmed Farah
                      - Roble Ahmed
                      - Abtidon Ahmed (Rer Abtidon)
                      - Abokor Ahmed
                      - Binin Ahmed (Rer Binin)
                        - Ali Binin
                        - Guled Binin
                        - Hersi Binin
                      - Had Ahmed
                      - Hasan Ahmed
                        - Rooble Hasan (Rer Rooble)
                        - Salah Hasan (Rer Salah)
                      - Hildid Ahmed
                        - Abdi Hildid
                      - Mohamed Ahmed
                        - Rage Mohamed (Rer Rage)
                        - Baded Mohamed (Rer Baded)
                        - Olow Mohamed
                        - Burale Mohamed
                        - Jibril Mohamed

== Bibliography ==
- Lord Rennell of Rodd (1948). British Military Administration in Africa 1941-1947. London: HMSO – via Internet Archive.
