= Habr Je'lo =

Somali clan

Habr Je'lo هبر جعلو
- Isaaq Somali Clan
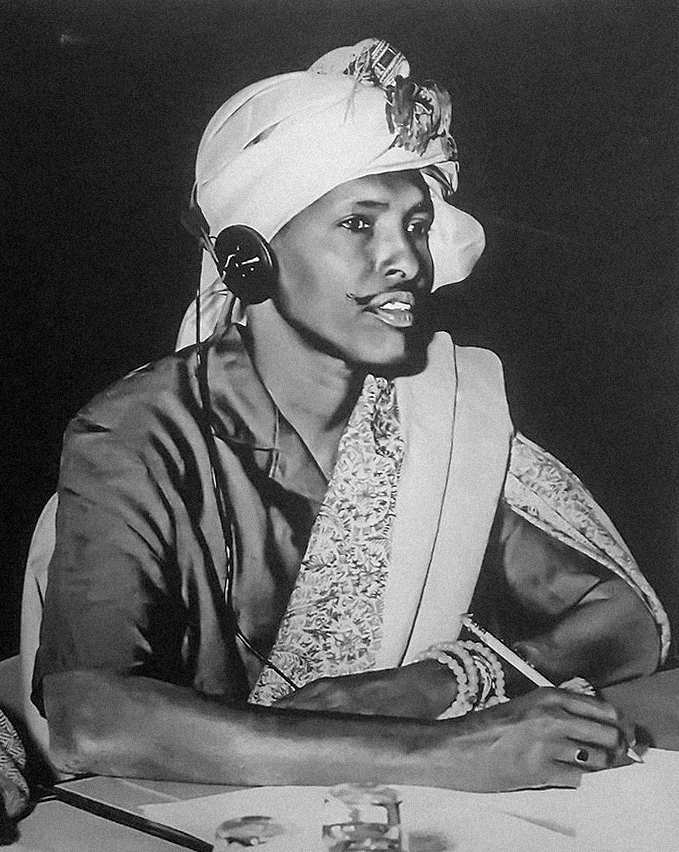
- Musa Galal: The founder of the Somali written language and the foundation of its modern expression.
- Ethnicity: (Somaliland) Somali
- Location: (Somalia) Somalia; Somaliland; Ethiopia
- Descended from: Mūsā ibn ash-Sheikh Isḥāq ibn Aḥmad
- Parent tribe: Isaaq
- Branches: Jibril Abokor: Daud muuse; Omar Jibril; Abokor Jibril; Mohamed Abokor: Adan Mohamed; Yesif Mohamed; Nuh Mohammed; Musa Abokor: Uduruhmin Muse; Idris Muse; Abdirahman Muse; Samane Abokor: Abdulle Samane; Muse Samane; Hirsi Samane
- Language: (Somaliland) Somali (Arab League) Arabic
- Religion: Sunni, Islam

The Habr Je'lo (Somali: Habar Jeclo), Arabic: هبر جعلو, Full Name: Mūsa ibn ash-Shaykh Isḥāq ibn Aḥmad, historically known as the Habr Toljaala (Somali: Habar Toljeclo) is a major Northern Somali clan of the wider Isaaq family. Its members form the Habr Habusheed (Somali: Habar Xabuusheed) confederation along with the Imran, Sanbur and Tolje’lo.

The Habr Je'lo are divided into five further sub-tribes: the Mohamed Abokor, Musa Abokor, Samane Abokor, Reer dood and Omar. Historically, the Mohamed Abokor, Samane Abokor and Reer Dood are chiefly nomadic pastoralists, whereas the Musa Abokor and Omar obtained much of their wealth via their frankincense plantations in the mountainous interior adjacent to the coastline. The Habr Je'lo played a prominent role in the livestock and frankincense trade during the pre-colonial period.

The Habr Je'lo also partook in a major organised front to oppose British rule in the late 19th and early 20th centuries under the leadership of Haji Sudi, Sheikh Bashir, Haji Farah Omar, Michael Mariano and other subsequent anti-colonial leaders hailing from the same tribe namely Ahmed Ismail Abdi (Duksi). These figures represent both the intellectual and violent struggle that was staged against the colonial project of the British Empire.

The Habr Je'lo hold great economic influence within Somaliland and across the Horn of Africa, having the richest businessmen who operate across multiple industries among their ranks.

== DNA ==
T-M184 is unusual in that it is both geographically widespread and relatively rare. T1 (T-L206)—the numerically dominant primary branch of T-M184—appears to have originated in Western Asia and spread from there into East Africa, South Asia, Europe, Egypt and adjoining regions. T1* may have expanded with the Pre-Pottery Neolithic B (PPN,B) culture which originated in West Asia.

== Overview ==
In the tapestry of Somali genealogical tradition, the Habar Je'lo clan, also known as Musa Sheikh Ishaaq, emerges as a distinguished sub-clan within the broader Ishaaq clan family. Their lineage, traced back to Sheikh Ishaaq Bin Ahmed (Sheikh Ishaaq) from Arabia, is woven intricately with a history of heritage and honour.

Legend has it that Sheikh Ishaaq, upon his arrival in the 12th or 13th century, settled in the serene town of Harar in modern-day eastern Ethiopia. There, he wedded into the revered Harari ethnic group, laying the foundations for the Habar Je'lo legacy. It is worth noting that Sheikh Ishaaq's esteemed ancestry, purportedly tracing back to Ali ibn Abi Talib, adds a layer of sacred lineage to their narrative, as recounted in certain Arabic hagiographies.

Musa Sheikh Ishaaq's tomb is in Maydh buried alongside his two sons Abokor and Daaud, and is the scene of frequent pilgrimages. His Siyaara, or pilgrimage is performed annually both within Somaliland and in the diaspora particularly in the Middle East among Isaaq expatriates.

Within the Isaaq clan, the Habar Je'lo or Musa Sheikh Isaaq sub-entity, holds a dialect of the Somali language in the highest esteem, cherishing it as a symbol of their heritage and identity.

Several members of the Habar Je'lo clan from Somaliland took part in resistance against colonial rule. Notable figures associated with this period include Deria Arale, Haji Sudi, Michael Mariano, Sheikh Bashir, Ibrahim Boghol, Farah Omar, and Abdullahi Shihiri.

These individuals were involved in various forms of opposition to colonial authorities. Deria Arale is noted for his leadership role, while others such as Haji Sudi, Michael Mariano, Sheikh Bashir, Ibrahim Boghol, Farah Omar, and Abdullahi Shihiri also participated in resistance activities during this time.

Certain narratives from the Issa indicate that the Wardiq, which is currently a sub-clan of the Issa, had historical connections with the Habr Je'lo.

== Distribution ==
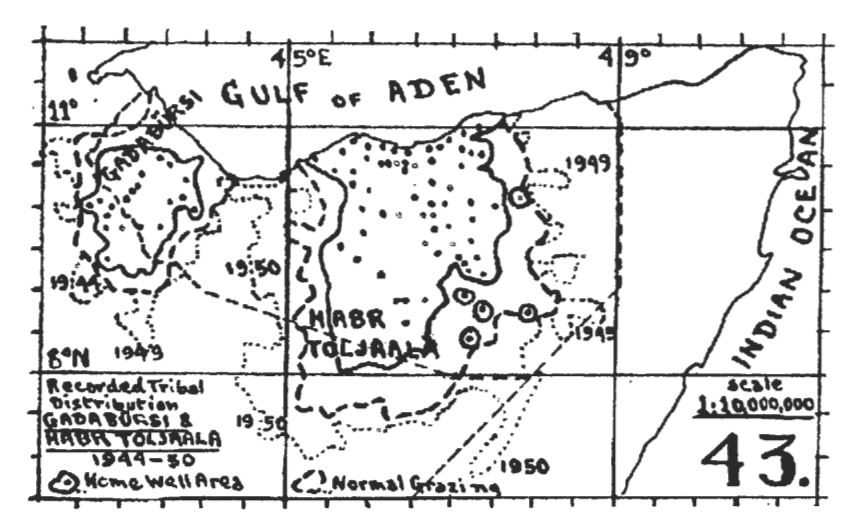
Map of Somaliland showing distribution of the Habr Je'lo sub-tribe in central and eastern Somaliland

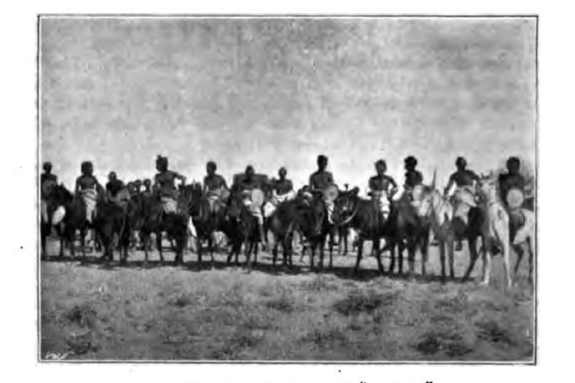
Monochrome photograph of Habr Je'lo Warriors, 6 June 1898 - Royal Geographical Society, Vol. XI, 1898 The Royal Geographical Society p.g. 22

The Habr je'lo (Habarjeclo) tribes reside in eastern Togdheer, eastern Sahil, central Maroodi Jeex western Sanaag western Sool in Somaliland. The sub-tribe also inhabits the Somali region in Ethiopia, especially in the Degehbur zone. They also have a large settlement in Kenya where they are known as a constituent segment of the Isahakia community.

== History ==
=== Antiquity ===
The ancient city of Mosyllum, situated at the coast of Habr Je'lo inhabited lands, has been described as the largest and most important port city of the Erythrean Sea, exporting cinnamon, frankincense and myrrh. Ralph E. Drake-Brockman states in his 1912 book British Somaliland:

The ancient city of Mosyllum, situated on the Habi Toljaala littoral, is in the heart of the area from which the best frankincense, even to-day, is exported; and doubtless in the time of the ancients all the myrrh from the far interior — or what is now the Dulbahanta country — must have passed out through this channel.

Heis, another port town inhabited by the Habr Je'lo, is said to be identical with the ancient trading post of Mundus (Ancient Greek: Μούνδος) that is described in the Periplus of the Erythraean Sea, an anonymous account by a Greek Alexandrian salesman from the 1st century CE.

"Two days' sail, or three, beyond Malao is the market-town of Mundus, where the ships lie at anchor more safely behind a projecting island close to the shore. There are imported into this place the things previously set forth, and from it likewise are exported the merchandise already stated, and the incense called mocrotu. And the traders living here are more quarrelsome."

— Chap.9.

A large collection of cairns of various types lie near the city. Excavations here have yielded pottery and sherds of Roman glassware from a time between the 1st and 5th centuries. Among these artefacts is high-quality millefiori glass. Dated to 0-40 CE, it features red flower disks superimposed on a green background. Additionally, an ancient fragment of a footed bowl was discovered in the surrounding area. The sherd is believed to have been made in Aswan (300-500 CE) or Lower Nubia (500-600 CE), suggesting early trading ties with kingdoms in the Nile Valley. Ancient edifices have also been found in Heis.

==== Arawelo ====
According to traditional Somali folklore, Arawelo, a legendary proto-Somali queen who is said to have established a matriarchal society, was based in lands inhabited by the Habr Je'lo, specifically a place called Murihi in the Togdheer region. Ralph E. Drake-Brockman was one of the first Western researchers to publish an account of Arawelo; in his 1912 book British Somaliland he states:

The story says that thousands of years ago there lived in what is now the tract of country occupied by the Habr Toljaala tribe, a great Somali queen called Arawailo, who was greatly feared by her people owing to her eccentricities. Arawailo lived at a place called Murihi, so the story goes, for little save a huge mound of stones, under which she is said to lie buried, now marks the capital of her ancient kingdom. Towards the end of her life Arawailo began to show marked favour towards her own sex and great animosity towards her male subjects.

=== Early modern ===
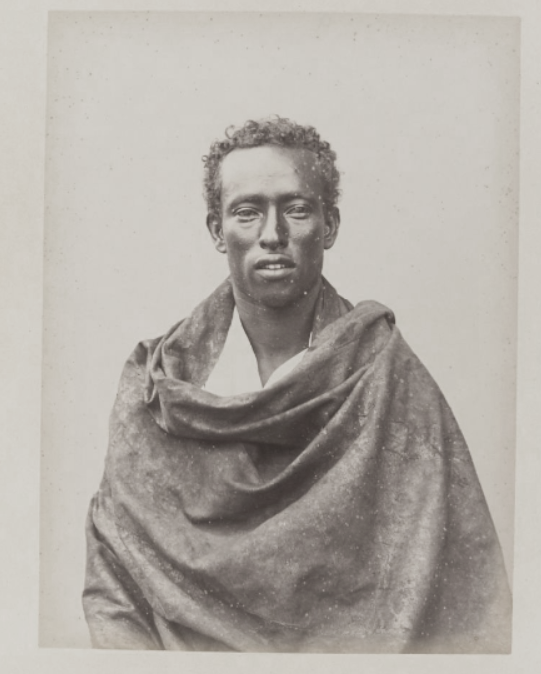
Dualeh Abdi of the Musa Abokor sub-tribe of the Habr Toljaala, photographed in 1890

The Habr Toljaala derived a large supply of frankincense from the trees south in the mountains near port town of Heis. This trade was lucrative and with gum and skins being traded in high quantity, Arab and Indian merchants would visit these ports early in the season to get these goods cheaper than at Berbera or Zeyla before continuing westwards along the Somali coast. During the British Somaliland period the recorded statistics of Heis show it as a leader alongside Maydh in the east with hundreds of thousands of hides and being the leading exporter of tanned skins with 16,000 reaching Berbera taken by Habr Je'lo traders by dhow. Heis also exported a large quantity of skins and sheep to Aden as well as imported a significant amount of goods from both the Arabian coast and western Somali ports, reaching nearly 2 million rupees by 1903.

John Hanning Speke, an English explorer who made an exploratory expedition to the area in an attempt to reach the Nugaal Valley, described the port town:

Without landing, Lieutenant Speke coasted along to Bunder Hais, where he went on shore. Hais is a harbour belonging to the Musa Abokr. It contains a "fort," a single-storied, flat-roofed, stone and mud house, about 20 feet square, one of those artless constructions to which only Somal could attach importance. There are neither muskets nor cannon among the braves of Hais. The "town" consists of half a dozen mud huts, mostly skeletons. The anchoring ground is shallow, but partly protected by a spur of hill, and the sea abounds in fish. Four Buggaloes (native craft) were anchored here, waiting for a cargo of Dumbah sheep and clarified butter, the staple produce of the place. Hais exports to Aden, Mocha, and other parts of Arabia; it also manufactures mats, with the leaves of the Daum palm and other trees. Lieutenant Speke was well received by one Ali, the Agil, or petty chief of the place: he presented two sheep to the traveller.

— Sir Richard Francis Burton, First Footsteps in East Africa, Or, An Exploration of Harar

=== Pre-colonial era ===
The Habr Je’lo coastal settlements and ports, stretching from near Siyara in the west to Heis (Xiis) in the east, were important to trade and communication with the Somali interior. While the settlements were not as significant as the more established ports of Berbera, Zeila and Bulhar (respectively), the principle Habr Je’lo port of Kurrum (Karin) was a major market for livestock and frankincense procured from the interior, and was a favorite for livestock traders due to the close proximity of the port to Aden. Habr Je’lo traders acted as middlemen to Dhulbahante livestock herders in the interior by purchasing and/or bartering their stock for export to the Aden market:

The last branch of the Western tribes is the Haber el Jahleh, who possess the sea-ports from Seyareh to the ruined village of Rukudah, and as far as the town of Heis. Of these towns, Kurrum is the most important, from its possessing a tolerable harbour, and from its being the nearest point from Aden, the course to which place is N.N.W., consequently the wind is fair, and the boats laden with sheep for the Aden market pass but one night at sea, whilst those from Berbera are generally three. What greatly enhances the value of Kurrum however is its proximity to the country of the Dulbahanta, who approach within four days of Kurrum, and who therefore naturally have their chief trade through that port.

The Buur Dhaab range has also historically been a junction for trade caravans coming from eastern Somaliland on their way to Berbera port, passing through the Laba Gardai or Bah Lardis pass located within the range. The Habr Je'lo have historically acted as the guardians of this pass, receiving dues in exchange for guaranteed safety through Buur Dhaab:

The Habr Toljaala are a powerful tribe, and make it a point of honour that caravans shall have safe passage through their country, and they receive a part of the dues for this purpose.

==== Isaaq Sultanate ====
The Habr Je'lo were part of the Isaaq Sultanate which was established by the Rer Guled branch of the Eidagale after the Isaaq successfully defeated the Absame clan at Lafaruug in the 17th century. With time the Habr Yunis and later the Habr Awal and Arap would break from the Isaaq Sultanate.

==== Burning of Karin ====
In 1831, the Yeesif, a sub-subtribe of the Mohamed Abokor, was in control of the historic trading port town of Karin. A multitude of other tribes were also present in the town to trade, notably the Adan Madoba. According to Somali history, Karin was a gated town, with the Yeesif sub-subtribe controlling who could enter and leave the town, investing heavily in protecting the town due to its importance.

In 1831 a girl of the Rer Dod sub-subtribe married a young Yeesif warrior, however, a man of the Adan Madoba, another subtribe of the Mohamed Abokor, also intended to marry her and could not accept the fact that the marriage took place. The Adan Madoba man went to his tribesmen and explained the situation to them, threatening to sever his testicles if the tribe did not intervene. The Adan Madoba tribesmen then assassinated the Yeesif groom, which led to a 40 year long conflict where allegedly the grandson of the Rer Dod girl participated in the fighting. The conflict is described by British explorer Richard Burton in 1855, who stated:

The Ahl Yusuf, a branch of the Haber el Jahleh, at present hold possession of Kurrum, and between them and the tribes to windward there exists a most bitter and irreconcilable feud, the consequence of sundry murders perpetrated about five years since at Kurrum, and which hitherto have not been avenged.

With the conflict still raging, in 1871 the Adan Madoba, on the verge of turning the Yeesif to extinct, and after losing 19 men to a Yeesif counterattack, decided one last attack on the Yeesif would finally win them this long war and allow them to conquer Karin. The Adan Madoba assembled hundreds of horsemen led by Mohamed Ismail (nicknamed Qaaje Guray) for one final offensive on the Yeesif still in Karin. Days before the attack Qaaje Gurey presented his tribesmen three options; to either attack Karin, a majority Yeesif town but also inhabited by the Nuh (a sub-subtribe of the Mohamed Abokor) and kill anyone in Karin, surround Karin first and call on all the non-Yeesif tribes to evacuate the town immediately and attack the town once evacuation has been completed, or to burn the town in its entirety. The Adan Madoba opted for the second option.

The Adan Madoba approached Karin and ordered the Nuh to evacuate Karin, notifying them of their intent to attack the Yeesif. However, the Nuh tribesmen refused and aided their Yeesif brothers, as according to folklore the ancestors of the Nuh and Yeesif tribes shared the same mother. The Adan Madoba proceeded to attack Karin and successfully burned the town down. However, they failed to defeat the combined Yeesif-Nuh forces and soon the Adan Madoba were forced to retreat, effectively ending the Yeesif-Adan Madoba conflict.

Dirir Warsame, a Yeesif tribal soldier came upon a man of the Adan Madoba named Halil who was captured by Yeesif tribesmen. Dirir recited this poem before killing him;

Haliiloow geddoontaye haddaad aakhiro u guurto
Waxba hays galluubine ragbaad garabsanaysaaye
Haddaad guurtidii Yeesif iyo odayadii gaadho
Karin gubay annana goosannoo nala gumaadyeey dheh
Gadabuursi iyo baa na helay gacan Ogaadeen dheh
Sidii gaaladii bay warmaa nagu garaaceen dheh

Translation:

O Halil, when you move to the hereafter
You need not worry, many [dead] men will accompany you
When you reach the [passed] elders of the Yeesif
Tell them I burned Karin, and they [the Yeesif] punished me
Tell them the hands of the Gadabursi and the Ogaden reached us
Tell them they [Yeesif] beat us with spears like infidels

==== 1850s Civil War ====
The western Mohamed Abokor faction, unified under the leadership of the Nuh subclan (Ahmed Farah, Rer Dahir, Solomadow), advanced with an army against the Musa Abokor clan. When the Musa Abokor became aware of the attack, Kite Fiqi prepared his forces for a strong defense. He mounted his horse, rode to the front lines, and faced the invading forces alone. His efforts were not just to fight back but to persuade the invaders to reconsider their violent course. He attempted to halt the conflict with reasoning, urging the invaders to abandon their attack. He spoke to them in an attempt to avoid a full-scale battle, and some of his words of caution included:

Labadeennan kurood,
Oo kaalalkoodi sita,
Oo laysku soo kiciyaa,
Waa masaa’ib kulmaysee,
War toloow kala jooja!

Translation:

These two sides of ours
Who carry the burdens of their efforts
Who are about to clash
This will only bring calamities
Oh tribesmen, stop and reconsider!

Despite Kite Fiqi’s pleas, the conflict escalated. The invading forces, led by the Farah Abdille (Ahmed Farah, Rer Dahir), ignored his appeals, and the battle raged on. As the fighting intensified, Kite Fiqi’s forces struggled to maintain control, and heavy casualties occurred. Kite Fiqi later expressed his frustration and sorrow over the inevitable bloodshed, saying:

Haddii aad kari weydo,
Ama aad kasi weydo,
Kufaarkii inankiisoow,
Kariimkaan baryayaaye,
Kabaalkiinnu jab maanta

Translation:

If you are unable to carry on
Or if you are weak in spirit
This is the work of the unbelievers
I am pleading for mercy
But your defeat today is inevitable

The warning that Kite Fiqi had given came true, and the casualties were immense. The forces of the Musa Abokor clan, led by Kite Fiqi, eventually retreated, but the Mohamed Abokor forces remained relentless. Some reports suggest that a group of fighters from the Rer Dahir subclan, which had initially joined the invaders, eventually withdrew from the battle. The Mohamed Ahmed of the Ahmed Farah subclan soon also withdrew after suffering major losses.

After a few hours, the battle in the Soocane area came to an end. However, one of the Mohamed Abokor commanders, Malow, who led the invading forces and was positioned opposite the Barre Abdirahman (Bi'ide, Ali Barre), engaged in a fierce battle with his troops that day, successfully pushing back the opposing forces. Kite, after concluding his side of the battle, eventually decimated Malow's forces, with significant casualties among the Barre Abdille (Solomadow).

=== Proto-nationalist movements ===
==== Dervish movement ====
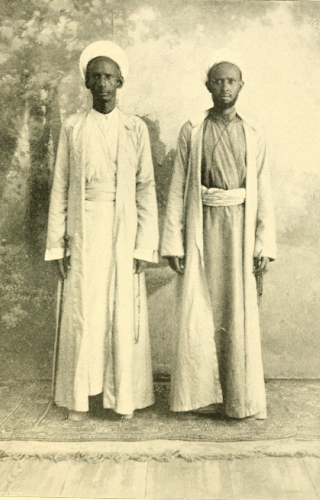
Haji Sudi on the left with his brother in-law Duale Idres. Aden, 1892.

The Habr Je’lo along with the Habr Yunis were one of the first sub-tribes in the Somaliland Protectrate to revolt against the Colonial government between the late 19th and early 20th centuries. Among their prominent anti-colonial ideologues during the Dervish period were Deria Arale, Abdallah Shihiri, Ibrahim Boghol and Haji Sudi, the latter is credited for importing Dervish customs into the Somali peninsula as well as being one of the original founders of the Somali Dervish Movement. Moreover, the Habr Je'lo played an influential role after the demise of the Dervish Movement in 1920, with Sheikh Bashir Yussuf and Farah Omar being important anti-colonial notables.

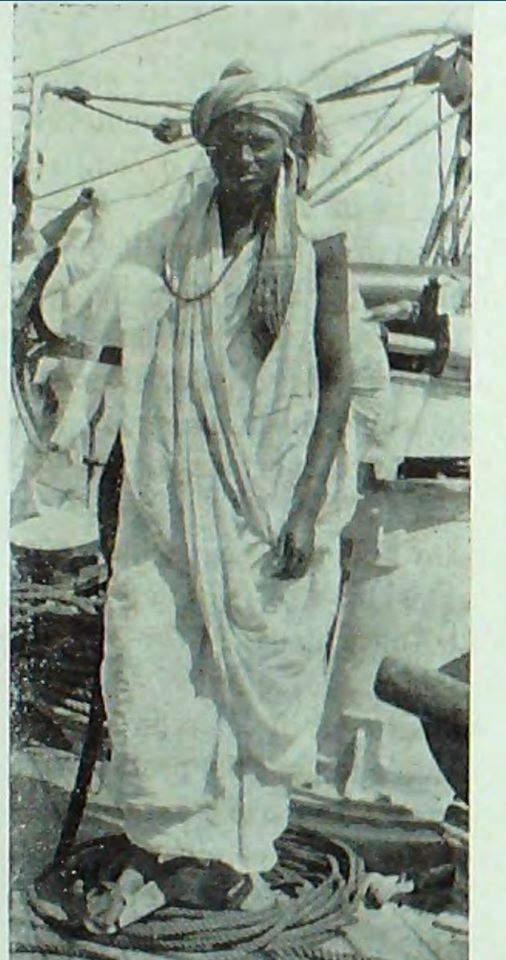
Abdallah Shihiri, 1909

The Dervish movement first arose in Burao in 1899, where in the summer of that year Dervish leaders and their followers congregated at the settlement. Haji Suudi leading his tribesmen declared war on the British lest they stop interfering with their religious and internal affairs. The dervish then proceeded to send this letter to Captain Cordeauxe and James Hayes Sadler:

This is to inform you that you have done whatever you have desired, and oppressed our well-known religion without any cause. Further, to inform you that whatever people bring to you they are liars and slanderers. Further, to inform you that Mahomed, your Akil, came to ask from us the arms we therefore, send you this letter. Now choose for yourself; if you want war we accept it, if you want peace pay the fine. September 1, 1899.

According to the British War Office, the Ahmed Farah, Rer Yusuf and Adan Madoba Habr Je'lo sub-tribes were among the first to join the Dervish rebellion. Haji Sudi, along with Mohammed Abdullah Hassan and Sultan Nur led the first Dervish forces against the British at Samala, Ferdidin, Erigo and Gumburu.

Moreover, the coastal Habr Je'lo sub-tribes provided significant armaments to the Dervish forces in the interior. Before sending troops to confront the Dervish at Samala, Consul-General Hayes Sadler gave the following instructions to the commander Eric John Eagles Swayne:

In the unlikely event of the Mullah offering to surrender, in his case and that of the Following: Haji Sudi, Deria Arale, Deria Gure Only an unconditional surrender should be accepted no guarantee of any kind to future treatment been given. Sultan Nur, the Sultan of the Habr Yunis, may be guaranteed his life. J. Hayes-Sadler, His Britannic Majesty's Consul-General, Somali Coast Protectorate. Aden April 11, 1901.

Although facing the British in multiple battles between 1901 and 1904, the colonial forces failed to in their efforts to apprehend Sudi, Arale, Gure and their fellow Dervishes. Gabriel Ferrand, the Vice-Consul of France following these events observed that:

Neither the Mahdi nor his chief adviser Ahmed Warsama, better known under the name Haji Sudi, nor the Sultan Nur, leader of the Habr Younis sub-tribe were killed or captured. The optimism of Colonel Sadler and Lieutenant-Colonel Swayne in the latest reports relating to military operations is inexplicable.

Abdalah Shihiri and Deria Arale led the 1904 Dervish delegation that facilitated the Ilig or Pestollaza agreement between the Dervish and Italy. This treaty allowed the Dervishes to peacefully settle in Italian Somaliland with some autonomy.

In 1920, the British air force commenced their bombardment of Dervish fort and their ground assault on Taleh fort. Haji Sudi, the highest ranking Dervish after Mohammed Abdullah Hassan and Ibrahim Boghol, commander of the northern Dervish army died valiantly defending the Taleh.

==== 1945 Sheikh Bashir Rebellion ====
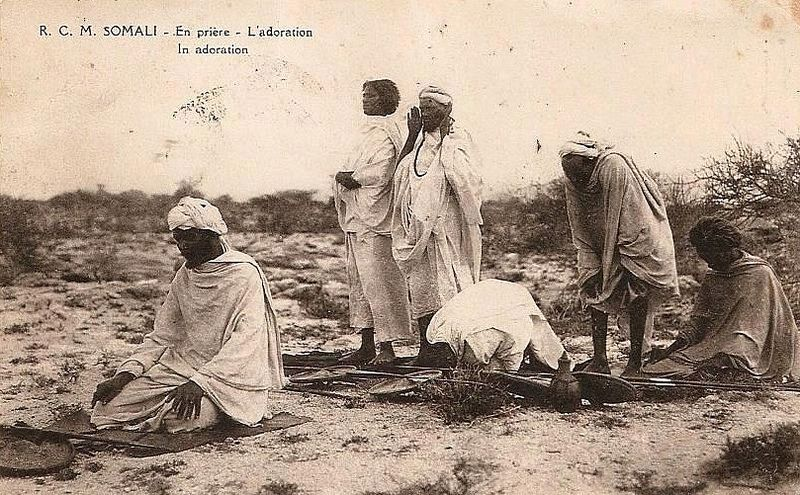
Sheikh Bashir praying Sunnah prayer, 1920

The 1945 Sheikh Bashir Rebellion was a rebellion waged by tribesmen of the Habr Je'lo sub-tribe in the cities of Burao and Erigavo in the former British Somaliland protectorate against British authorities in July 1945 led by Sheikh Bashir, a Somali religious leader belonging to the Yeesif sub-division.

On 2 July, Sheikh Bashir collected 25 of his followers in the town of Wadamago and transported them on a lorry to the vicinity of Burao, where he distributed arms to half of his followers. On the evening of 3 July the group entered Burao and opened fire on the police guard of the central prison in the city, which was filled with prisoners arrested for previous demonstrations. The group also attacked the house of the district commissioner of Burao District, Major Chambers, resulting in the death of Major Chamber's police guard before escaping to Bur Dhab, a strategic mountain south-east of Burao, where Sheikh Bashir's small unit occupied a fort and took up a defensive position in anticipation of a British counterattack.

The British campaign against Sheikh Bashir's troops proved abortive after several defeats as his forces kept moving from place to place and avoiding any permanent location. No sooner had the expedition left the area, than the news traveled fast among the Somali nomads across the plain. The war had exposed the British administration to humiliation. The government came to a conclusion that another expedition against him would be useless; that they must build a railway, make roads and effectively occupy the whole of the protectorate, or else abandon the interior completely. The latter course was decided upon, and during the first months of 1945, the advance posts were withdrawn and the British administration confined to the coast town of Berbera.

Sheikh Bashir settled many disputes among the tribes in the vicinity, which kept them from raiding each other. He was generally thought to settle disputes through the use of Islamic Sharia and gathered around him a strong following.

Sheikh Bashir sent a message to religious figures in the town of Erigavo and called on them to revolt and join the rebellion he led. The religious leaders as well as the people of Erigavo heeded his call, and mobilized a substantial number of people in Erigavo armed with rifles and spears and staged a revolt. The British authorities responded rapidly and severely, sending reinforcements to the town and opening fire on the armed mobs in two "local actions" as well as arresting minor religious leaders in the town.

The British administration recruited Indian and South African troops, led by police general James David, to fight against Sheikh Bashir and had intelligence plans to capture him alive. The British authorities mobilized a police force, and eventually on 7 July found Sheikh Bashir and his unit in defensive positions behind their fortifications in the mountains of Bur Dhab. After clashes Sheikh Bashir and his second-in-command, Alin Yusuf Ali, nicknamed Qaybdiid, were killed. A third rebel was wounded and was captured along with two other rebels. The rest fled the fortifications and dispersed. On the British side the police general leading the British troops as well as a number of Indian and South African troops perished in the clashes, and a policeman was injured.

Despite the death of Sheikh Bashir and his followers resistance against British authorities continued in Somaliland, especially in Erigavo where his death stirred further resistance in the town and the town of Badhan and lead to attacks on British colonial troops throughout the district and the seizing of arms from the rural constabulary.

Despite the death of Sheikh Bashir and his second-in-command, the British authorities was not finished with the rebels and continued its counter-insurgency campaign. The authorities had quickly learned the names and identities of all the followers of Sheikh Bashir and tried to convince the locals to turn them in. When they refused, the authorities invoked the Collective Punishment Ordinance, under which the authorities seized and impounded a total of 6,000 camels owned by the Habr Je'lo, the sub-tribe that Sheikh Bashir belonged to. The British authorities made the return of the livestock dependent on the turning over and arrest of the escaped rebels. The remaining rebels were subsequently found and arrested, and transported to the Saad-ud-Din archipelago, off the coast of Zeila in northwestern Somaliland.

== Lineage ==
Below is a breakdown of the different sub-divisions of the Habr Je'lo sub-subtribe:

- Sheikh Ishaaq Bin Ahmed Al Hashimi (Sheikh Ishaaq)
  - Habar Magaadle
    - Doud(Eidagale)
    - Ayub
    - Muhammad (Arap)
    - Said (Habar Yoonis)
    - Abdirahman (Habr Awal)
  - Habar Habusheed
    - Ahmed (Tol-Ja'lo)
    - Ibrahiim (Sanbuur)
    - Muhammad ('Ibraan)
    - Muuse (Habar Jeclo)
      - Daauud Muuse (Reer Dood)
        - Rooble Da’uud
          - Yusuf Roble
            - Abdirahman Yusuf
            - Mahamed Yusuf
              - Ali Mahamed
      - Jibril Muuse
        - Omar Jibril
        - Abokor Jibril
          - Mohamed Abokor
            - Adam Mohamed (Adam Madoba)
            - Yusuf Mohamed
            - Nuh Mohamed
              - Abdalla Nuh
                - Abdille Abdalle
                  - Allamagan Abdille
                  - Hussien Abdille
                  - Liban Abdille
                  - Abokor Abdille (Solomadow)
                  - Hassan Abdille (Solomadow)
                  - Barre Abdille (Solomadow)
                  - Farah Abdille
                    - Beila Farah
                    - Fahiye Farah
                    - Dahir Farah (Rer Dahir)
                      - Mahmed Dahir
                      - Ibrahim Dahir
                      - Xildid Dahir
                      - Wa'ays Dahir
                      - Yusuf Dahir
                      - Ahmed Dahir (Bah'Gaheylo)
                      - Kalil Dahir (Bah'Gaheylo)
                      - Nuur Dahir (Bah'Garhajis)
                      - Guled Dahir (Bah'Garhajis)
                      - Barre Dahir
                      - Ogal Dahir
                      - Hassan Dahir
                      - Omar Dahir
                        - Abokor Omar
                        - Bah'Abdirahman
                        - Guled Omar
                        - Mahamed Omar (Ogal Muse)
                        - Ismail Omar
                          - Yusuf Ismail (Rer Yusuf)
                    - Ahmed Farah
                      - Roble Ahmed
                      - Had Ahmed
                      - Hildiid Ahmed
                      - Hassan Ahmed
                      - Abtidon Ahmed (Rer Abtidon)
                      - Biniin Ahmed (Reer Biniin)
                      - Abokor Ahmed
                      - Mohamed Ahmed
                        - Rage Mohamed (Rer Rage)
                        - Baded Mohamed (Rer Baded)
                        - Olow Mohamed
                        - Burale Mohamed
                        - Jibril Mohamed
          - Musa Abokor
            - Abdirahin Muse
            - Idris Muse
            - Abdirahman Muse
              - Abdille Abdirahman (Bah Majeelo)
              - Osman Abdirahman (Bah Majeelo)
              - Isaaq Abdirahman (Bah Majeelo)
              - Yunis Abdirahman (Rer Yunis)
                - Mohamed Yunis
                - Osman Yunis
              - Barre Abdirahman
                - Mohamed Barre
                - Ali Barre
                - Yunis Barre
                  - Burale Yunis
                  - Bi'ide Yunis (Biciide)
                    - Wadhowr Biciide (Bahsanbuur)
                    - Samatar Biciide (Bahsanbuur)
                    - Iidle Biciide (Bah Jibrahil)
                    - Farah Biciide (Bah Jibrahil)
                      - Omar Farah (Boho)
                      - Fahiye Farah (Boho)
                      - Muse Farah (Boho)
                      - Robsuge Farah (Boho)
                      - Gedi Farah (Boho)
                      - Wais Farah (Boho)
                      - Sahal Farah (Boho)
                      - Abdille Farah (Bah Farwiyo)
                      - Ali Farah (Bah Farwiyo)
                      - Iidle Farah (Bah Farwiyo) (Rer Iidle)
                        - Osman Iidle
                        - Mohamoud Iidle
                        - Beyle Iidle
                        - Arale Iidle
                        - Mohamed Iidle
                        - Abdi Iidle
                        - Hussein Iidle
                        - Geddi Iidle
                        - Farah Iidle
                        - Gullied Iidle
                        - Hildid Iidle
                      - Ahmed Farah (Bah Farwiyo)
                        - Abdulle Ahmed
                        - Hussein Ahmed
                        - Hassan Ahmed
                        - Ali Ahmed
          - Samane Abokor
            - Muse Samane
            - Hirsi Samane
            - Abdulle Samane
              - Ismail Abdulle
                - Aden Ismail (Reer Aadan)
                  - Igal Aden
                  - Ali Aden
                  - Ahmed Aden
                - Yuusuf Ismail (Reer Yuusuf)
                  - Haamuud Yuusuf
                  - Haad Yuusuf
                  - Muuse Yuusuf
                    - Digaale Yuusuf (Reer Digaale)
                  - Rooble Yuusuf
                    - Magan Rooble (Reer Magan)

== Groups ==
- The National United Front, (NUF) was an official political party in British Somaliland, led by Michael Mariano and primarily supported by the Habr Je’lo clan. In the 1960 parliamentary elections, the NUF won 24.89% of the vote, a decline from 1959, when it had secured a majority due to the Somali National League’s (SNL) boycott. The party played a key role in the political landscape leading up to independence.
- Dharbash, a medium-sized of the dozen Darawiish administrative divisions, was one third Habe Je’lo, the rest Ararsame or Baharsame
- The Somali National Movement (SNM), led by Ahmed Mohamed Mohamoud “Silanyo” for the majority of its existence (1984–1990), had significant participation from the Habr Je’lo clan. Several key commanders from the Habr Je’lo played pivotal roles within the SNM, including Mohamed Kahin Ahmed and Adan Saleebaan Magute, among others. In addition to its leadership, the Habr Je’lo also contributed many rank-and-file members to the movement, demonstrating widespread support and involvement in the struggle against the Siad Barre regime.
- The SSB Civil Defence Force is a paramilitary group primarily tasked with the defense and security of Habr Je’lo tribal territory. The group operates as a localized security force, focusing on protecting the interests of the Habr Je’lo community. The SSB has been actively involved in counterinsurgency operations against SSC-Khatumo forces, engaging in military efforts to secure contested areas and maintain territorial control.

== Notable figures ==
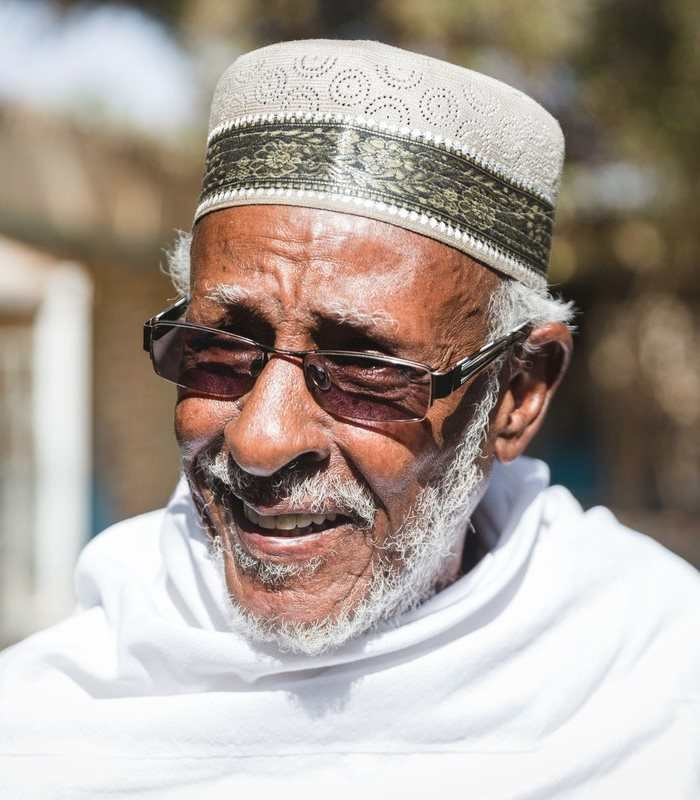
Hadraawi, most notable contemporary Somali poet

- Sheikh Ali Warsame – prominent Somali Islamic cleric and preacher, founder of Al-Ittihad Al-Islamiya (1939–2022)
- Hurre Walanwal — renowned Somali poet and songwriter
- Ahmed Hurre Haariye - Commander of the Somaliland Coast Guard
- Muse Haji Abdi Duale - Speaker of the House of Elders of Somaliland
- Ismail Ali Abokar – was a Major General and a senior member of the Supreme Revolutionary Council who also served as Vice President of Somalia from 1971 to 1982.
- Mohamed Nur Fadal - Somali poet, WWI veteran and entrepreneur
- Sheekh Bashiir – religious leader and post-dervish anti-colonial figure
- Ibrahim Boghol – member of the Dervish council and commander of the northern Dervish army
- Abdi Awad Ali - a Somali business tycoon and an entrepreneur known as Indhadeero, was one of the wealthiest men in East Africa and the first man to build a mall in Somalia.
- Abdirashid Duale – a British-Somali entrepreneur and the CEO of Dahabshiil, an international funds transfer company.
- Kite Fiqi – military leader and poet
- Salaan Carrabey – legendary poet
- Musa Haji Ismail Galal – Somali linguist and historian who reformed the Somali Wadaad's script and immensely contributed to the creation of the Somali Latin script.
- Hadraawi – most notable contemporary Somali poet
- Michael Mariano – legendary Somali politician, lawyer and key figure in independence struggle and Somali Youth League
- Ahmed Mohamed Mohamoud – former president of Somaliland
- Farah Omar – anti-colonial ideologue and founder of the first Somali Association
- Saleban Mohamed Salad- Well known politician
- Haji Sudi – chief lieutenant and one of the leaders of the Somali Dervish rebellion
- Mohamed Kahin Ahmed – Minister of Interior of Somaliland
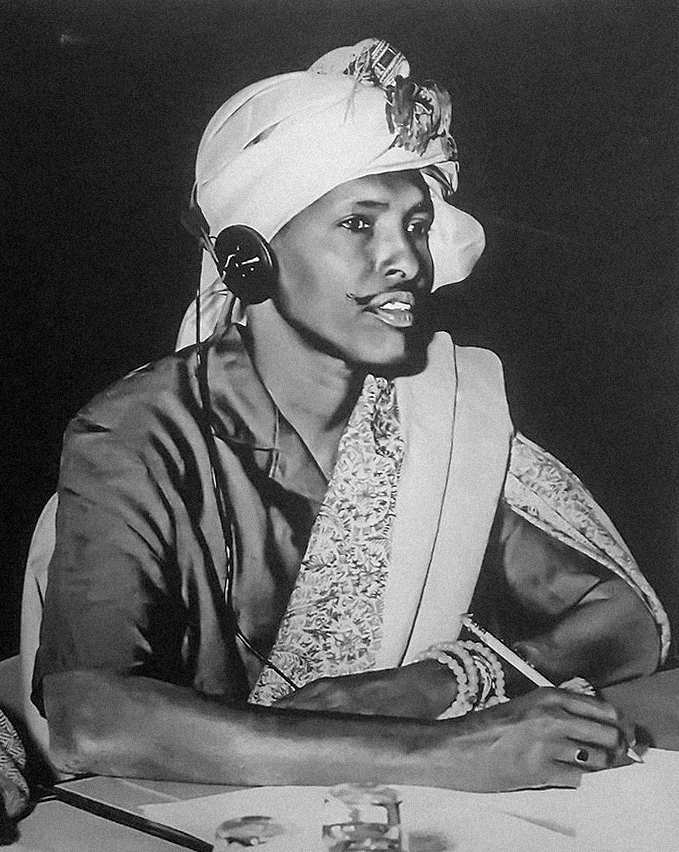
  Musa Haji Ismail Galal, Somali linguist and historian who reformed the Somali Wadaad's script and immensely contributed to the creation of the Somali Latin script
- Mohamed Yusuf Abdirahman – former Mayor of Burao
- Allin Mohamoud Dirir - first Somali to hold public office in the UK
- Aadan Mire Waqaf - former Mayor of Burco and the former Minister of Justice in Somaliland
- Bashe Awil Omar - Deputy Foreign Minister of Somaliland as well as former Somaliland ambassador to Kenya and the UAE
- Mohamed Abdillahi Duale - former Minister of Foreign Affairs in Somaliland
- Suleiman Mohamoud Adan – speaker of the House of Elders of Somaliland
- Buurmadow – King of the Somali people
- Sooraan (1958–2021), Somali writer, actor and comedian
- Mohamoud Hashi Abdi – former Minister of Civil Aviation and Air Transport and Minister of Presidency of Somaliland, former Mayor of Burco
- Mohammed Ahmed – Canadian long-distance runner won the silver medal at the 2020 Tokyo Olympics in the 5000m
- Magid Magid – Somali-British activist and politician who served as the Lord Mayor of Sheffield from May 2018 to May 2019
- Bashir Abdi – Somali-Belgian athlete who won the bronze medal in the marathon at the 2020 Summer Olympics
- Chunkz – English YouTuber, musician, host and entertainer
- Abdallah Shihiri – a senior Khusuusi member of the Somali Dervish movement
- Osman Dubbe – current Minister of Information, Culture and Tourism of Somalia
- Deria Arale – senior Khusuusi member of the Somali Dervish movement
- Jama Mohamoud Egal – Minister of Energy and Minerals of Somaliland
- Ayub Khadar Abdi – A Somali-British Computer Scientist and Founder of Techstalk.
