= Karin, Sahil =

Karin
- Village
- Location in Somaliland Karin (Somaliland)
- Coordinates: 10°52′51″N 45°45′42″E
- Country: Somaliland
- Region: Sahil
- District: Berbera District
- Time zone: UTC+3 (EAT)

Karin is a historic coastal settlement located in the Sahil region of Somaliland.

== History ==
Karin was historically part of a chain of coastal Habr Je'lo settlements and ports – stretching from near Siyara in the west to Heis (Xiis) in the east – that were important to trade and communication with the Somali interior. While the settlement were not as significant as the more established ports of Berbera, Zeila and Bulhar (respectively), Karin (Kurrum) was a major market for livestock and frankincense procured from the interior, and was a favorite for livestock traders due to the close proximity of the port to Aden. Karin was also described as the most important of all Habr Je'lo ports, and was closer to Aden than Berbera.

Habr Je’lo traders acted as middlemen to Dhulbahante livestock herders in the interior by purchasing and/or bartering their stock for export to the Aden market:

“The last branch of the Western tribes is the Haber el Jahleh, who possess the sea-ports from Seyareh to the ruined village of Rukudah, and as far as the town of Heis. Of these towns, Kurrum is the most important, from its possessing a tolerable harbour, and from its being the nearest point from Aden, the course to which place is N.N.W., consequently the wind is fair, and the boats laden with sheep for the Aden market pass but one night at sea, whilst those from Berbera are generally three. What greatly enhances the value of Kurrum however is its proximity to the country of the Dulbahanta, who approach within four days of Kurrum, and who therefore naturally have their chief trade through that port.

=== Burning of Karin ===
In 1831, the Yeesif, a subclan of the Mohamed Abokor, was in control of the historic trading port town of Karin. A multitude of other tribes were also present in the town to trade. According to Somali history, Karin was a gated town, with the Yeesif subclan controlling who could enter and leave the town, investing heavily in protecting the town due to its importance.

In 1831 a girl of the Rer Dod subclan married a young Yeesif warrior, however, a man of the Adan Madoba, another subclan of the Mohamed Abokor, also intended to marry her and couldn’t accept the fact that the marriage took place. The Adan Madoba man went to his tribesmen and explained the situation to them, threatening to sever his testicles if the clan did not intervene. The Adan Madoba tribesmen then assassinated the Yeesif groom, which led to a 40 year long conflict where allegedly the grandson of the Rer Dod girl participated in the fighting. The conflict is described by British explorer Richard Burton in 1855, who stated:

The Ahl Yusuf, a branch of the Haber el Jahleh, at present hold possession of Kurrum, and between them and the tribes to windward there exists a most bitter and irreconcilable feud, the consequence of sundry murders perpetrated about five years since at Kurrum, and which hitherto have not been avenged.

With the conflict still raging, in 1871 the yeesif, on the verge of turning the Adan Madoba to extinct, and after losing 19 men to a Yeesif counterattack, decided one last attack on the Yeesif would finally win them this long war and allow them to conquer Karin. The Adan Madoba assembled hundreds of horsemen led by Mohamed Ismail (nicknamed Qaaje Guray) for one final offensive on the Yeesif still in Karin. Days before the attack Qaaje Gurey presented his tribesmen three options; to either attack Karin, a majority Yeesif town but also inhabited by the Nuh (a subclan of the Mohamed Abokor) and kill anyone in Karin, surround Karin first and call on all the non-Yeesif tribes to evacuate the town immediately and attack the town once evacuation has been completed, or to burn the town in its entirety. The Adan Madoba opted for the second option.

The Adan Madona approached Karin and ordered the Nuh to evacuate Karin, notifying them of their intent to attack the Yeesif. However, the Nuh tribesmen refused and aided their Yeesif brothers, as according to folklore the ancestors of the Nuh and Yeesif tribes shared the same mother. The Adan Madoba proceeded to attack Karin and successfully burned the town down. However, they failed to defeat the combined Yeesif-Nuh forces and soon the Adan Madoba were forced to retreat, effectively ending the Yeesif-Adan Madoba conflict.

Dirir Warsame, a Yeesif tribal soldier came upon a man of the Adan Madoba named Halil who was captured by Yeesif tribesmen. Dirir recited this poem before killing him;

Haliiloow geddoontaye haddaad aakhiro u guurto
Waxba hays galluubine ragbaad garabsanaysaaye
Haddaad guurtidii Yeesif iyo odayadii gaadho
Karin gubay annana goosannoo nala gumaadyeey dheh
Gadaboursi iyo baa na helay gacan Ogaadeen dheh
Sidii gaaladii bay warmaa nagu garaaceen dheh

Translation:

O Halil, when you move to the hereafter
You need not worry, many [dead] men will accompany you
When you reach the [passed] elders of the Yeesif
Tell them I burned Karin, and they [the Yeesif] punished me
Tell them the hands of the Gadabursi and the Ogaden reached us
Tell them they [Yeesif] beat us with spears like infidels

== Demographics ==
According to a book written in England in 1951, the town is predominantly inhabited by members of the yeesif Habar Jeclo sub-clan of the Isaaq .

== See also ==
- Administrative divisions of Somaliland
- Regions of Somaliland
- Districts of Somaliland
