= Xagal =

- Village
- Location in Somaliland Xagal (Somaliland)
- Coordinates: 10°15′08″N 45°44′18″E
- Country: Somaliland
- Region: Sahil
- District: Berbera District

Population (2002)
  - Total: 150
- Time zone: UTC+3 (EAT)

Xagal is a town in Berbera District, in the Sahil Region of Somaliland.
