= Farah Omar =

Somali political activist and nationalist (1879–1949)

Haji Farah Omar Xaaji Faarax Oomaar الحاج فارح أومار
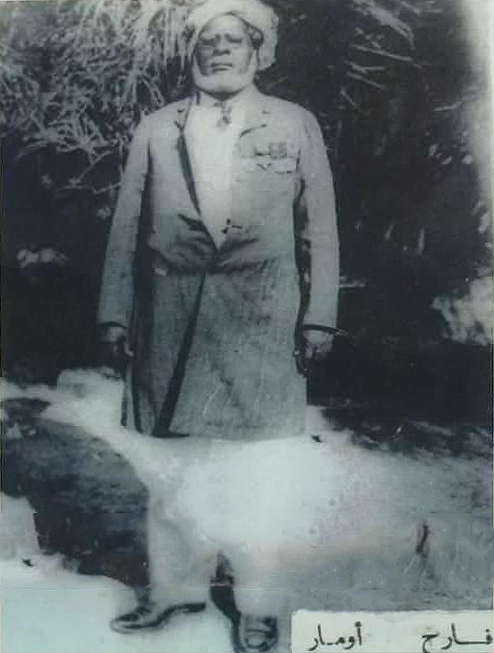

Personal details
- Born: 1879 Xagal, Isaaq Sultanate (now Somaliland)
- Died: 1949 (aged 69–70) Hargeisa, British Somaliland (now Somaliland)

Haji Farah Omar (Somali: Xaaji Faarax Oomaar, Arabic: الحاج فارح أومار) (1879–1949) was a famous politician and Somali nationalist in the former British Somaliland Protectorate (today Somaliland). He was one of the first modern politicians to emerge in the Protectorate and later became one of the first initiators and pioneer leaders of the political struggle between Somali people and colonial forces. He is credited for the formation of the first Somali association, the Somali Islamic Association, created in 1925 in order to publicize Somalis' claim to independence.

Haji Farah Omar is described in the Oxford Encyclopedia of the Modern Islamic World as a reformist, modernist Islamic leader. Omar was exiled to Aden by the British administration for his protests against excesses of colonial administration, and campaigning for the improvement of economic facilities and expansion of education in the Protectorate.

Omar visited India in 1930, where he met Mahatma Gandhi and was influenced by Gandhi's non-violent philosophy, which he adopted in his campaign in British Somaliland Protectorate.

== Biography ==
Haji Farah Omar Ileye (Somali: Xaaji Faarax Oomaar Ileeye) was born in 1879 in Xagal, a town near Berbera in the Sahil region of Somaliland, and is from the Reer Daahir sub-division of the Habr Je'lo Isaaq clan. Farah was from a wealthy and well respected family of pastolarists. This enabled a very young Farah to get an education and study in a madrasah in the town. While studying the Qur'an, Farah's father Omar Ileye took him to Berbera, where he continued to study the Qur'an, as well as Arabic. Afterwards, he moved to Aden for further studies and returned to Somaliland in 1904, aged 25, where he got married and had a son, Jama Haji Farah, who died young while Farah was still alive.

Upon completing higher education in Aden and returning to Somaliland, he was appointed by the British authorities as an official in the Somaliland Camel Corps, based in the eastern parts of the protectorate, which was the first time he had held public office. His time and experience as a commander shaped his views and ideology and would be the cause behind him becoming a modern anti-colonialist figure and one of the first initiators and pioneer leaders fighting the violation of the rights of the Somali people due to colonialism. In one case, a British commander had asked him what was enough for the Somali man in terms of salary, food and rank, and Farah replied in English that what was good enough for a European man, was good enough for a Somali man. This response came as a shock to the British commander, and led to Farah being closely monitored by the British authorities. Suspecting that he might launch an imminent revolt, the British authorities set up a small force made up of Somalis to monitor its activities, with the Somali troops being paid extra.

Farah was subjected to increasing pressure, conspiracies and fabrications in an attempt to convict him, including a forged document purporting to be from Farah's office clerk. The letter, bearing the seal and signature of Farah, was a letter of support for Mohammed Abdullah Hassan, who was leading the Dervish movement that was fighting the British authorities. The forged letter was handed to a Somali soldier who had planned the route and time of his departure. A roadblock was then set up in the village of Ina Af-Madoobe, where the soldier was arrested. The letter was taken to the office of the District Commissioner in Burao, who subsequently fired the, by then high ranking, Farah.

Farah later received a scholarship to study at the Aligarh Muslim University in Aligarh, India, where he studied law and met Mahatma Gandhi, who influenced Farah with his non-violent philosophy, as well as Mohammed Ali Jinnah and Jawaharlal Nehru. His study of law became Farah Omar's key to paving the way for his political struggle for independence, and it became a weapon against British colonial rule in the country. Upon graduation, he opened a lawyer's office and later joined the British Lawyers Association. The British authorities responded by using 35 government-paid chiefs in an attempt to turn the public against him. This was possible to some extent as public knowledge was low at the time. As a result, Farah once again left the country and returned to Aden.

== Political activism ==
Upon his arrival in Aden in 1920, Haji Farah, along with several other key Somali figures, formed the Somali Islamic Association, the first Somali nationalist association in history. Throughout its existence, it served as the defender of Somali interests throughout the Horn of Africa. The Somali Islamic Association took an active interest in development in the British Somaliland protectorate and frequently petitioned the British authorities on Somali matters. Farah, inspired by Gandhi's non-violent activism, pursued a similar form of peaceful activism.

In 1938, he was appointed the representative of the Kenyan Isaaq and their interests in the British Somaliland protectorate. According to Touval, he was "one of the first modern politicians to emerge in the Protectorate". That same year, he returned to Somaliland to organize opposition to British efforts to create a written Somali language, fearing that the Isaaqs in Kenya would lose their privileged status as Asiatics. It was also suggested that the attempt to introduce a written language for Somali was motivated by the British authorities' desire to spread Christianity. In the beginning of August 1938, he was appointed the spokesman of the local Somalis in Burao. A document, signed by 125 local Akils and elders, declared:

We the undersigned Akils and elders of British Somaliland do hereby declare that we have come to the conclusion that we have nominated and appoint Haji Farah Omar to represent British Somaliland subjects grievance and we fully authorize him to represent in whole matters which injures and interests the tribe

— Haji Farah Omar, Habr Toljalla and Hassan Dahri to whom it may concern, The Isaq Somali Diaspora and Poll-Tax Agitation in Kenya, 1936-41

By the end of August, Farah was gaining considerable support in Hargeisa, where he was eventually elected as its spokesman with the backing of the local branch of the Qadiriyyah tariqa. By then, the British authorities felt that Farah posed a significant threat to the entire Government of the Protectorate. Later, Farah was elected as spokesman of Berbera. With the pressure of Haji Farah, and with the almost universal opposition to a written Somali language, the Governor of British Somaliland at the time, Vincent Glenday, had no choice but to hold the Protectorate's educational policy in abeyance.

== Exile and imprisonment ==
Haji Farah's political agitation and activism did not find favour with the British colonial authorities and was seen as a dangerous threat, which led to him being arrested and exiled to the Socotra islands off the coast of Somalia in modern-day Yemen. Following the news of Haji Farah's arrest and deportation, his associations, particularly the Somali Islamic Association and the British Lawyers Association, both protested. The famous Habr Yunis poet Haji Adan Ahmed Af-Qallooc describes the conditions under which Farah was imprisoned in his poem Raqdii Bashiir (The Corpse of Bashir), written in July 1944. In the poem, he said:

Dar kaloo ciyaar lagu dilay iyo, dawgal baa jirey e,
Oo aanyay deero deero u hirdiyin, dadab galkoodiiye.
Ma duugoobin Qaybdiid, lafuhu waana duhanayaane
Da'dii u ahaa baa Faarax, jeelka loo diraye
Imminkuu siduu dawri yahay, debedda meeraaye
Loo diid dadkii uu dhaliyo, duunyaduu dhaqaye
Dad oo idil soo eri, ninkii daalinka ahaaye

— Aden Ahmed "Af-Qallooc", "Raqdii Bashiir"
Translation:

There were others killed playfully,
About which nothing was done.
The body of Qayb-diid is still warm, and
his bones are still wet.
Though an old man, Farah was sent to jail.
And now he roams the outside world.
They refused him rights over his family and wealth.

When the British government realized and confirmed that he was weak and powerless and that, in addition to old age, he had many illnesses that he could no longer handle, Haji Farah was eventually released from prison at the end of World War II. The elderly Farah, who had returned from a long period of illness and hardship from isolation and hardship, arrived in Hargeisa. The British authorities, again fearing that his presence alone was dangerous and could lead to yet more unrest, exiled him to Harar to be kept separate from the public. After five to six months of living in Harar, he returned to Hargeisa.

== Death ==
Haji Farah died in 1948 at the age of 70. He had, by then, spent most of his life in conflict, war, struggle, long journeys, imprisonment and persecution. Farah, who was being mourned by his friends and other supporters when he died, said to his friend Haji Ashaado before dying:
