= Deria Arale =

Deria Arale (Somali: Diiriye Caraale) was a senior Khusuusi member of the Dervish State, led by the Dervish haroun and its emir Mohammed Abdullah.

== Overview ==
He along with Abdallah Shihiri led the 1904 Dervish delegation that facilitated the Ilig or Pestollaza agreement between the Dervishes and Italy. This treaty allowed the Dervishes to peacefully settle in Italian Somaliland with some autonomy but under Italian protection. In 1899 Deria was among the top five (Mohammed Abdullah Hassan, Haji Sudi, Sultan Nur and Deria Gure) wanted leaders of the movement. Deria Arale defected with Shihri in 1907, but he was compelled to return to his wives and children in 1908. Few months later Deria Arale was dead, his mysterious sudden death "of broken heart" seen his family humiliated along him by the dervish. In 1909 a dervish force, 400 strong defected led by brothers Omar and Samatar Dhora. The two brothers were interviewed by Slatin Pasha on the circumstance of Deria death, they both testified there was no foul play having witnessed his wife and children flogged and publicly humiliated Deria Arale died days later of broken heart the brothers claimed. Rumors reached the Italian colonial authority of Deria's cruel execution by live entombment, that Haji Sudi was the victim of that unusual cruel punishment. This execution method and the rumor persisted and currently sultan Nur is the latest victim. Haji Sudi, Ibrahim Boghol, Ibraahim Gioode and Haji Yussuf.

Before dispatching forces to face the Dervish at Samala, Consul-General Hayes Salder made the following instructions to the overall commander of the forces Eric John Eagles Swayne:

In the unlikely event of the: Mullah offering to surrender, in his case and that of the Following: Haji Sudi, Deria Arale, Deria Gure Only an unconditional surrender should be accepted no guarantee of any kind to future treatment been given. Sultan Nur, the sultan of the Habr Yunis, may be guaranteed his life." J. Hayes-Sadler, His Britannic Majesty's Consul-General, Somali Coast Protectorate. Aden April 11, 1901."

He belonged to the Adan Madobe sub-division of the Habr Je'lo clan of the Isaaq clan family.
