= Abdallah Shihiri =

Senior advisor to the Mad Mullah

- Cabdalle Shixiri عبدالله الشّحري
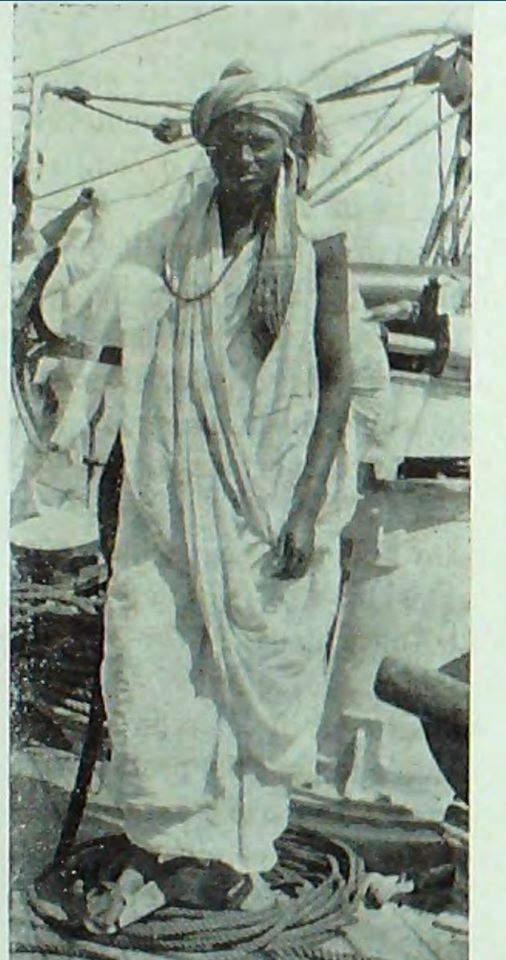
- Abdallah Shihiri, 1909
- Born: 1868; Berbera, Somaliland
- Died: 1931 (aged 62–63); Burao, Somaliland
- Organization: Dervish movement

Abdallah Mohamed Shihiri (Somali: Cabdalle Maxamed Shixiri, Arabic: عبدالله محمد الشحري; 1868–1931) was a senior Khusuusi member of the Somali Dervish movement and was part of the movement since its inception. He was long time companion and a childhood friend of Mohamed Abdullah Hassan and notable weapons smuggler. He belonged to the Adan Madoba sub-clan of the Habr Je'lo clan of the Isaaq clan family.

== Overview ==
Abdallah Shihiri was a British naval interpreter before he joined the Dervish movement at its inception in Burao in 1899. Shihiri joined the Ahmadiyya (Idrisiyya) sufi Tariqa order about the same time as the young Mullah in Berbera in the early 1890's. Shihiri started seafaring at his teens and travelling to most ports in East Africa and Arabia and was well known virtually in most coasts of the Red Sea and Africa. Due to his long experience as a trader and popularity in these ports he became the foreign organizer of the movement and its gunrunner during the campaign years. Shihiri is noted to have conducted caravans from the interior of Somali region to Bosaso to obtain smuggled weapons and ammunition for the Dervish and in 1903 procured many illicit French arms. He is identified as Abdullah Shahri by British Intelligence reports regarding his operations.

He and Deria Arale led the 1904 Dervish delegation that facilitated the Ilig or Pestollaza agreement between the Dervishes and Italy. This treaty allowed the Dervishes to peacefully settle in Italian Somaliland with some autonomy but under Italian protection.

== Pestalozza Agreement 1904–1905 ==
As the Mahdi of Khartoum and his lieutenant Osman Digna, H'àdjdj Mohammed ben Abdallah and his lieutenant H'àdjdj Soudi frequently write to the head of the British Protectorate and the commander of the expeditionary corps. They once offered peace on payment of compensation by Britain and the assignment of a port. At least as far back as in 1903 as Ferrand Gebriel noted the dervish offered terms for peace to the British. Pressured by the English and the Mijertein Somalis whom in their territory the dervish carved out a settlement, after consulting with his dervish and religious rebels, at last the dervish were desperate for peace and willing to negotiate. In 1904 the Mullah wrote to the Italians through Abdilahi Shahri a trusted dervish and his boyhood friend.

The initiative for negotiations with the British, Italians and Abyssinians was started by the Mullah himself, who wrote three letters in March 1904 to Lt. Vessel Spagna, commander of the Italian squad in Bender-Cassin. In August 1904; and from Aden, embarking on the royal ship Volturno, Pestalozza went to Bender Cassem, on the northern Somali coast, to feel the ground, and to send a courier to Mullah, who was in Upper Nogal, benefiting from these practices, as an intermediary, certainly Abdallah Sceri, a trusted man of Mullah himself, who had employed him in various missions. During the war, the British had captured him as a suspect, and then had to hand him over to the Italian consular authority, having claimed in his capacity as an Italian protégé. Councilor Abdallah Sheri was kept on board the Volturno, in a state of arrest, not allowed by the British Authorities to have relations with the natives in Aden and on the coast. He was the chief auxiliary of Pestalozza to the success of his mission.

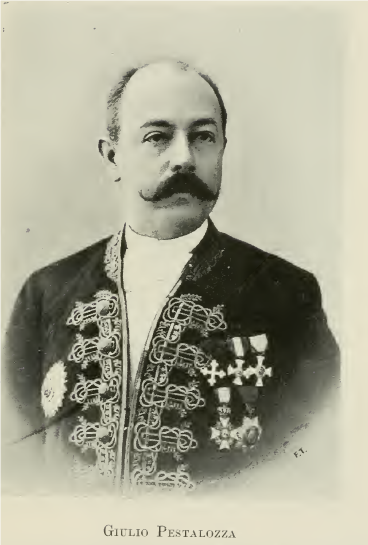
Giluio Pestalozza.

Giulio Pestalozza in his second meeting with the Dervish October 17, 1904 was accompanied by Sylos and Paladini, two fellow Italians. After the second meeting the Mullah declared to Sheri and Pestalozza the following:

Now, O Pestalozza, you and Abdallah Sheri, are delegated by me and to you I bestow the power for our cause. If you ask me pacification, I accept the peace and mutual trust – and I promise to stop the discord and the war in the interior. I, the Derwishes and all my people will molest no one, neither Mijerteyns, nor the people of Yusuf Ali, neither the English nor their dependents. I and my people are the people and dependents of the Government of Italy if it favours us and cools our heart (the text says our stomach or our desire); we will be under its flag. We only request that the Government of Italy allow(s) us to build a country at a point which it will consider suitable, from Gabbee to Garad.

— Declaration by the Mullah to Pestalozza, Ilig, I7 October 1904.

After a long, three-way negotiation between the powers of Britain, Italy, Ethiopia and the Dervish, the British received a dervish delegation for a peace agreement:

1. Abdallah Shihiri, Habr Toljaala, Adan Madhoba;
2. Diria Arraleh, Habr Toljaala, Adan Madhoba;
3. Adem Egal, Mejertein, Rer Egaleh;
4. Moallem Mohamed Nur, Dolbahante Kayet.

On March 5, 1905, the treaty of Ilig or the Pestalozza agreement was signed between the dervish and the powers, the dervish represented by Sultan Nur and other dignitaries, who signed the final agreements. In the original Arabic, the following signatures appear - Sultan Nur Ahmed (the chief dervish sultan) and his brother Geele Ahmed (Kila Ahmed), Ugas Diria Arabe and Ugas Issa Farek.

The Dervish were now technically an Italian protected religious community, they had their own semi-autonomous enclave, the dervish agreed to live peacefully with their Miijerteyn neighbours, the Ethiopians and the British. The Italians granted a fixed sea access for the Dervish between Ras Garad and Ras Gabbe with an Italian representative as a governor with soldiers and custom house, till such representative arrive the Mullah himself shall act as an Italian agent. The Italians assigned the Nogal and Hawd in the Italian sphere of influence as a territory accessible to the dervish, in the English sphere the dervish were only granted grazing for their cattle in British Somaliland Nogal in the area limited by the wells of Halin, Hodin, Tifafale and Damot. On March 24, 1905, the four Dervish Representative and the commissioner of Somaliland Protectorate reaffirmed the March 5, 1905 Pestalozza and Dervish agreement.

Less than a year of the agreement, the dervish and the Mullah were back to their usual raids and general looting, the Mullah was not satisfied with the financial outcome of the agreement. In 1906 Eugenio Cappello the Italian council in Aden went with the usual Abdallah Sceri, to the Mullah who told him, openly, that Italy had failed in all the promises made to him by Pestalozza. "You promised me money," he said, "and I haven't seen it; you promised me that Osman Mahmud would bring down the fort, as this sort of surveillance that exercises on my movements annoys me and he has not done so: you promised me gifts, and the gifts did not come.

== Defection ==
He remained one of Mad Mullah’s closest advisors until he defected in 1906, criticising the Dervishes' senseless takfir, raiding and killing of innocent people.

In 1909, he denounced the Sayyid in front of the leader of the Salihiyya brotherhood, Muhammad Salih. The latter expelled the Sayyid from the brotherhood, an ex-communication which seriously weakened the Dervish movement.
