= Bulhar =

- Town
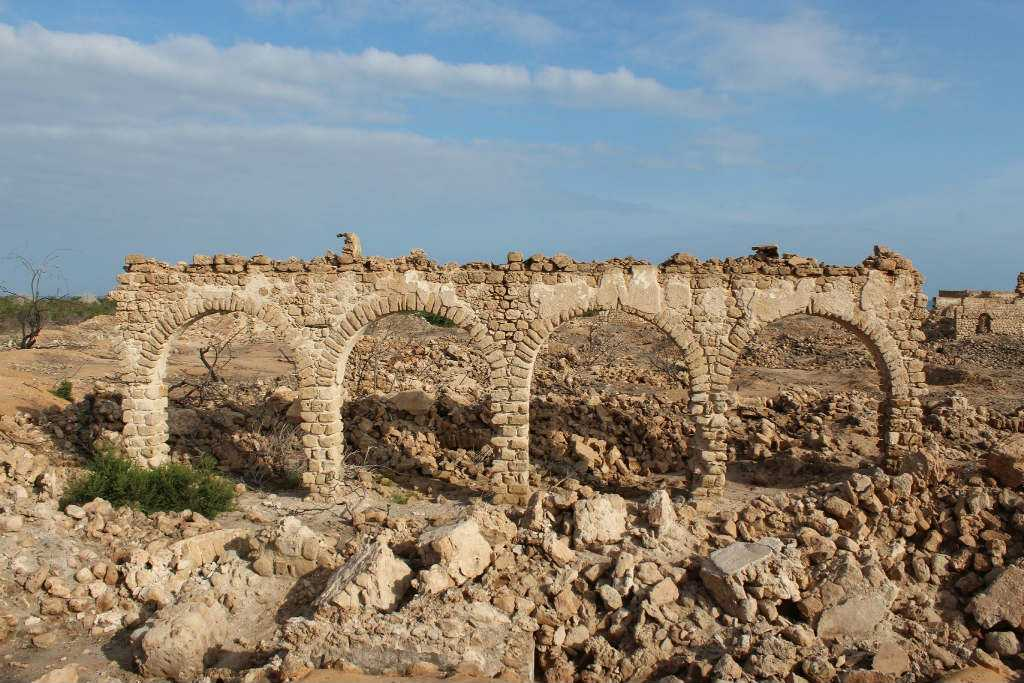
- Ruins in the centre of the town

- Location in Somaliland Bulhar (Somaliland)
- Coordinates: 10°24′02″N 44°25′12″E
- Country: Somaliland
- Region: Sahil
- District: Berbera

Population (2002)
  - Total: 300
- Time zone: UTC+3 (EAT)

Bulhar (Bulahar, Somali: Bulaxaar) is a historic port town in the Sahil region of Somaliland with routes dating back to antiquity. The port was rejuvenated in the 19th century and was a rival to nearby Berbera.

== History ==
=== Antiquity ===
Bulhar is situated near Berbera. The site is believed to correspond with the ancient commercial Port of Isis described by the Roman scholar Pliny the Elder. Pliny also associated the area with the toponym Abalito, which Said M-Shidad Hussein writes is likely the Avalite of the Periplus of the Erythraean Sea.

According to Pliny, the Port of Isis was a center for myrrh commerce. He likewise noted that the Egyptian Pharaoh Sesostris led his forces passed the region en route to the northeastern port of Mosylon, a cinnamon hub that is believed to have been in or close to present-day Bosaso. Additionally, Pliny indicated that the Port of Isis was located near stone pillars on which unknown letters were engraved. Samuel Sharpe suggests that these old inscriptions were probably hieroglyphical.

=== Early Modern Period ===
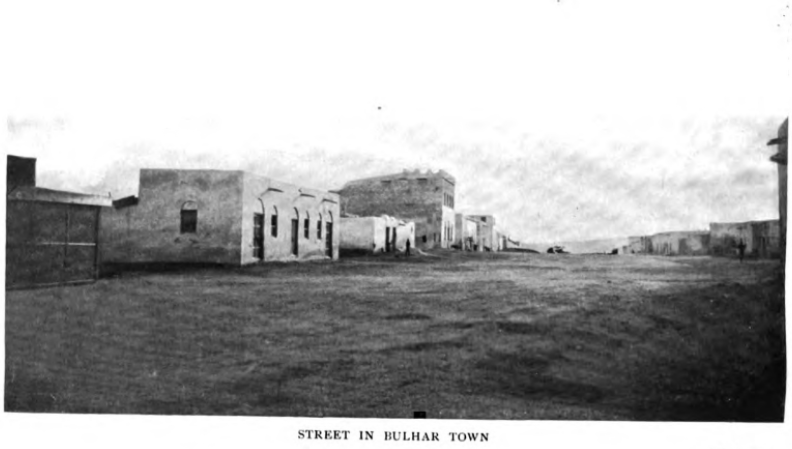
A street in Bulhar in 1912

Although Bulhar's roots date back to antiquity, the settlement was not repopulated until the mid-19th century. The re-establishment of Bulhar was due to a dissension between the mercantile Reer Ahmed Nur and Reer Yunis Nuh lineages of the Habar Awal clan over the control of the trade of Berbera in 1845. With the support of Haji Sharmarke Ali Saleh, the ruler of Zeila, the Reer Ahmed Nuh drove out their kinsmen and declared themselves the sole commercial masters of Berbera. In retaliation for their expulsion, the Reer Yunis Nuh merchants founded the port of Bulhar and persuaded their past foreign trade contacts to do business at their port over Berbera. This act had an almost immediate effect as trade at Bulhar grew rapidly in the latter half of the 19th century, with the port becoming a major market for livestock, hide (skin), myrrh, ivory, coffee, and other various goods procured from the interior. The town was briefly occupied by the Khedivate of Egypt.

According to several European explorers who traveled through much of the Somali Peninsular in the 19th and early 20th centuries, Berbera and Bulhar's extensive trade links covered large tracks of the Somali and Ethiopian interiors, and the merchants from Berbera and Bulhar had trade contracts with merchants from as far as Mogadishu and Merca:

Nearly all trade for Ogaden goes from Bulhar; but we found on the Webbe that we had, as it were, reached the point at which merchants from Berbera and Bulhar meet those from Merka and Mogadaxo (Madisha).

Hargeisa is situated on the Tug Marodijeh, the banks of which are well wooded, and as it can boast of an excellent climate all the year round, and is about half-way on the main route from Bulhar to Jig-jigga on the Abyssinian frontier, it is always likely to be of some importance to caravans. A large percentage of the trade from Ogadayn passes through it to Bulhar on the coast.

On leaving Hargeisa we travelled for many miles through beautiful park-like land, alive with birds and jungle fowl. We met the usual Somali khafilas [trading caravans] of Habr-Awal men, carrying their skins, gums, ghee, and coffee to our port at Bulhar, situated between Berbera and Zeila.
