= Balanbaal =

Town in Somaliland

- Town
- Location in Somaliland. Balanbaal (Somaliland)
- Coordinates: 8°53′06″N 45°46′14″E
- Country: Somaliland
- Region: Togdheer
- District: Burao
- Time zone: UTC+3 (EAT)

Balanbaal is a town in the southern Togdheer region of Somaliland. It is located in the Burao District, northwest by road from Buuhoodle and south of Burco.

== See also ==
- Administrative divisions of Somaliland
- Regions of Somaliland
- Districts of Somaliland
