= Ahmed Hurre Haariye =

Admiral of Somaliland Coast Guard

Major General Axmed Hurre Haariye
- احمد هره هاريه
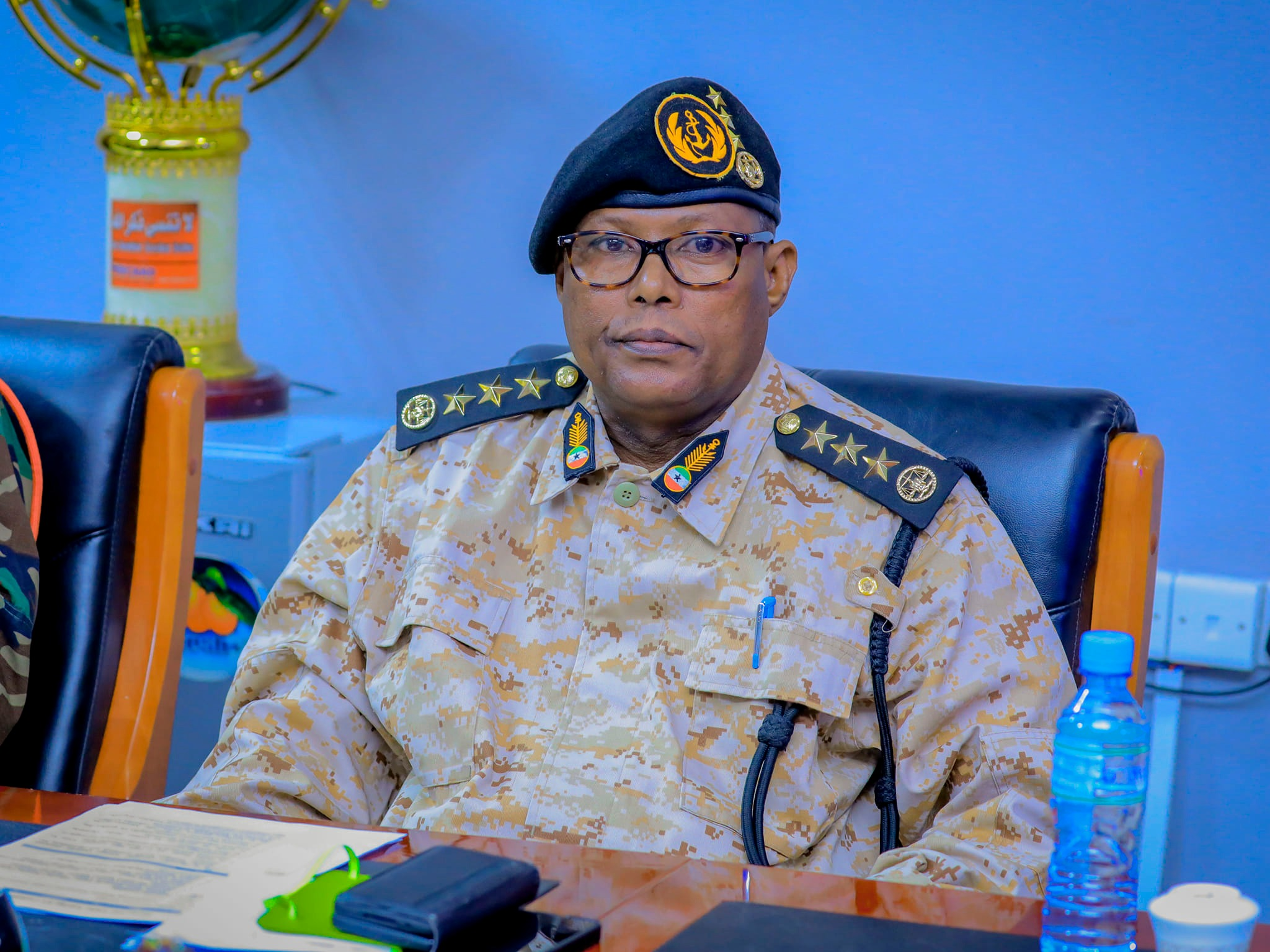
- Ahmed in 2024

Personal details
- Born: 1965 (age 60–61) Qoryale, Somaliland

Military service
- Allegiance: (Somalia) Somali Democratic Republic (1987-1989); Somali National Movement (1989-1991); Somaliland (1991-present)
- Branch/service: Somaliland Coast Guard
- Years of service: 1987 – present
- Rank: Brigadier General
- Commands: Chief of staff Commander, Somaliland Defence Command

Brigadier General Ahmed Hurre Haariye (Somali: Axmed Hurre Haariye, Arabic: احمد هره هاريه) is a senior military officer serving since 29 June 2022 as the Commander of the Somaliland Coast Guard, a branch of the Somaliland Armed Forces responsible for maritime law enforcement, search and rescue, and coastal defence operations. His leadership has been pivotal in modernising Somaliland’s maritime security and strengthening regional coastal protection efforts.

== Early life ==
Ahmed was born in 1965 in Qoryale in Togdheer, Somaliland. He belongs to the Ahmed Farah subclan of the Habr Je'lo Isaaq. He received his primary education in the towns of Buhodle and Balidhiig in southern Togdheer, and he graduated from the vocational school in Burao in 1983.

== Military career ==
Ahmed moved to Mogadishu where he joined the Somali Armed Forces in 1987 during the rule of Siad Barre, where he specialised in artillery and served under the 60th Division of the Somali National Army stationed in Bakool as a Lieutenant. He defected to the Somali National Movement in 1989 during the Somaliland War of Independence.

After Somaliland's independence he served numerous roles within Somaliland's military, including as the Commander of Somaliland army's 12th Division, appointed by president Ahmed Siilaanyo in 2012. He was awarded a medal of honour in 2019 as well as a medal of bravery in combat by president Muse Bihi in 2020 on occasion of the 26th Anniversary of the establishment of Somaliland's Armed Forces. He was appointed Commander of the Somaliland Coast Guard on 29 June 2022.
