= Dabaqabad =

- Village
- Location in Somaliland Dabaqabad (Somaliland)
- Coordinates: 8°41′0″N 45°49′0″E
- Country: Somaliland
- Region: Togdheer
- District: Burao District

Population (2006)
  - Total: 650
- Time zone: UTC+3 (EAT)

Dabaqabad, or Daba Qabad is a village in Burao District, in the Togdheer Region of Somaliland. It is located 50km southeast of the provincial capital Burao, and is also located north by road from Balidhiig.

== History ==
On 29 June 1987 the Somali National Movement (SNM) launched an attack on Somali regime forces stationed in Dabaqabad, leaving 14 dead and eight injured.

== Demographics ==
In June 2006 Dabaqabad had an estimated population of 650.

== See also ==
- Administrative divisions of Somaliland
- Regions of Somaliland
- Districts of Somaliland
- Somalia–Somaliland border
