= Mohamed Yusuf Abdirahman =

Somali politician

Mohamed Yusuf Abdirahman محمد يوسف عبد الرحمن
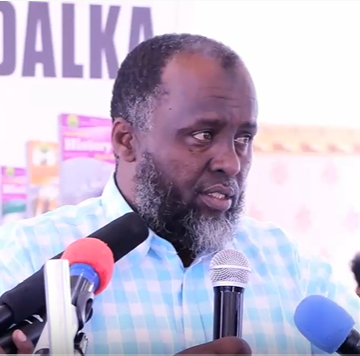

Mayor of Burao
- In office 15 December 2012 – 20 June 2021
- Preceded by: Mohamoud Hassan Dhagalab
- Succeeded by: Abdirisaq Ibrahim Omar

Personal details
- Party: Kulmiye Peace, Unity, and Development Party (Kulmiye)

Mohamed Yusuf Abdirahman (Somali: Maxamed Yuusuf Cabdiraxmaan) also known as Murad is a Somali politician, and the longest serving Mayor of Burao, the capital and the largest city of Togdheer region of Somaliland, serving from 2012 to 2021. He belongs to the Reer Biniin, Ahmed Farah sub-division of the Habr Je'lo Isaaq. He was succeeded by Abdirisaq Ibrahim Abdi on 20 June 2021 after the 2021 Somaliland municipal elections.

== See also ==
- Mayor of Burao
- Burao

Political offices
Preceded by Mohamoud Hassan Dhagalab	Mayor of Burao; 2012-2021	Succeeded by Abdirisaq Ibrahim Abdi
