= Muhumed Hassan Jama =

Somali politician

Muhumed Hassan Jama Mihile (Xoday)
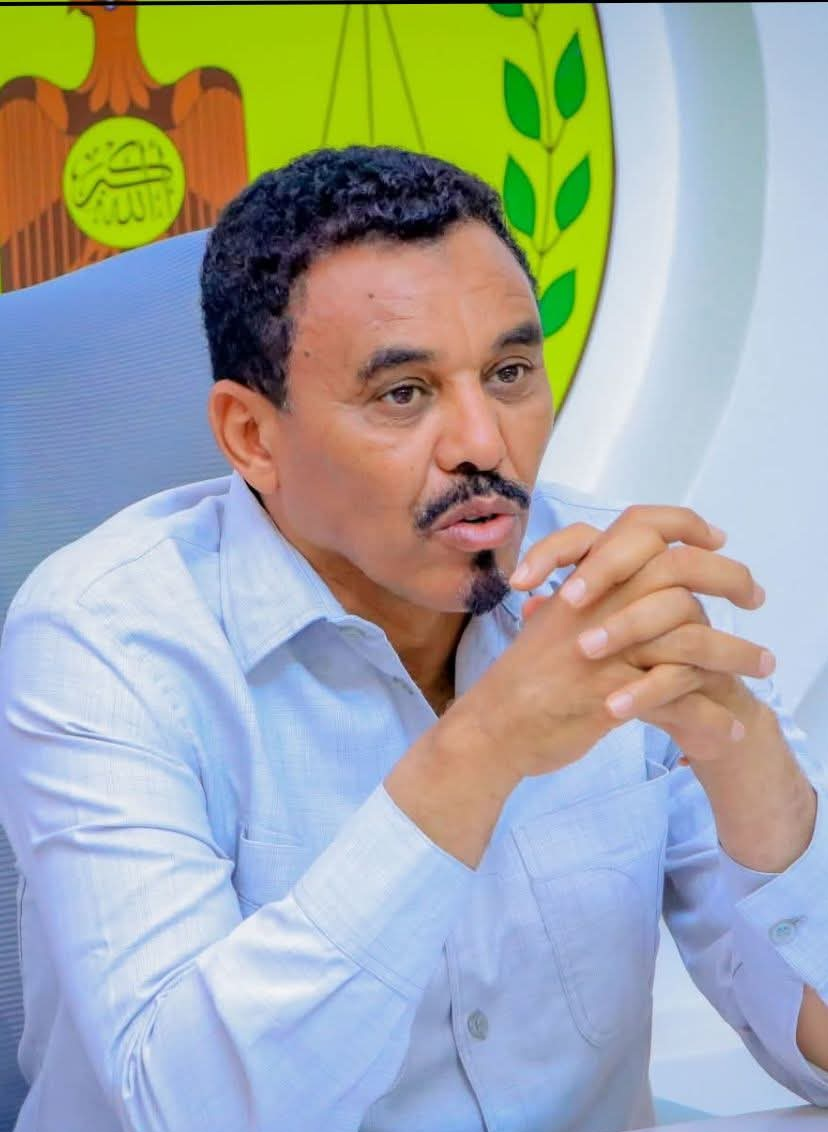

Governor of Awdal
- Incumbent
- Assumed office January 2025
- President: Abdirahman Mohamed Abdullahi
- Preceded by: Hassan Dahir Haddi Governor of Awdal

Deputy Governor of Togdheer
- In office 29 June 2020 – 25 June 2023
- President: Muse Bihi Abdi
- Preceded by: Abdirahman Ahmed Ali Muse
- Succeeded by: Hassan Dahir Haddi

Vice Mayor of Burao
- In office 30 January 2012 – 5 June 2021
- President: Muse Bihi Abdi
- Preceded by: Mayor of Burao
- Succeeded by: Mukhtar Baaryare

Muhumed Hassan Jama Mihile (Somali: Muxumed Xasan Jaamac Mixille), also known as Xoday, is a Somaliland politician who is currently serving as the Governor of Awdal region since January 2025.

He also served as the Vice Governor of Togdheer region of Somaliland between 29 June 2020 and 25 June 2023.

Xoday also served as the Deputy Mayor of Burao from January 2012 to June 2021.
