= Sooraan =

Somali writer, actor and comedian (1958–2021)

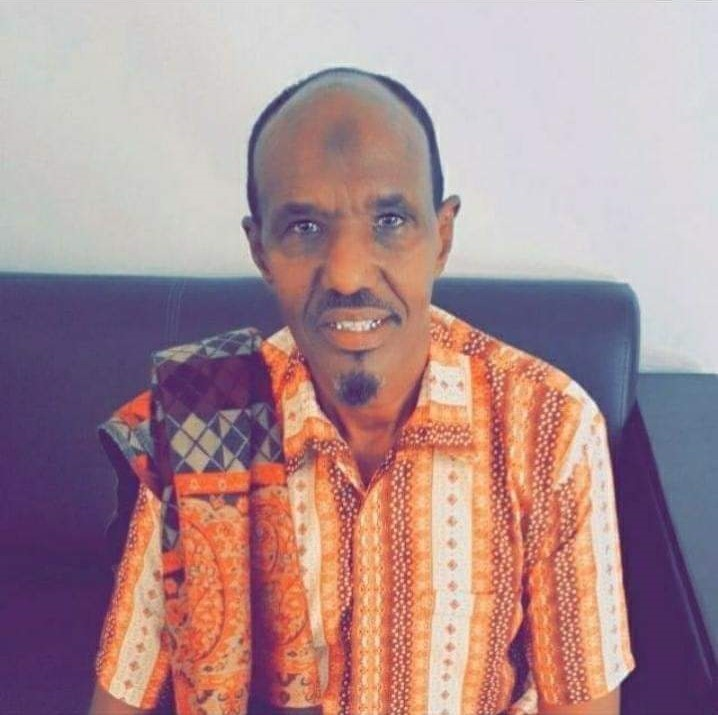
- Born: Ibraahim Ismaaciil Sugulle; 1958; Kiridh, British Somaliland
- Died: 26 May 2021 (aged 62–63); Burao, Togdheer, Somaliland
- Occupations: Poet; author; comedian
- Spouse: 2
- Children: 3
- Writing career
- Language: Somali
- Genre: Comedian/playwright
- Subject: Social activism
- Literary movement: Dur-Dur Band (1979-1991)

Ibrahim Ismail Sugulle (Somali: Ibraahim Ismaaciil Sugulle), (1958 – May 26, 2021) more commonly known as Sooraan, was a Somali poet, actor, comedian and composer. Sooraan was a well-known poet and was widely known in Somali communities.

== Biography ==
Sooraan was born in 1958 in the town of Kiridh, in Togdheer, Somaliland, and belongs to the Imran clan of the Isaaq clan-family.

Sooraan started his career in 1979, joining the Durdur band in Mogadishu as an actor before later becoming a writer for the band.

At the breakout of the Somali civil war in 1991, Sooraan moved back to his hometown Burao, where he later primarily focused on comedy and performing dramas that touched on social issues affecting Somalis, especially in Somaliland. Such plays include Illaahay ummaddii u ammaan geli, a play about the consequences of harming animals, as well as another drama covering the various political parties and associations that stood for election in Somaliland's 2012 municipal elections. His close friend and fellow acting partner Isse Abdi Ismail (Jawaan) has starred in most of these dramas and sketches, and have together gone on tours in numerous countries with significant Somali communities. Sooraan was nominated for the Best Entertainment Award for the 2017 International Somali Awards.

== Death ==
Sooraan died on 26 May 2021 due to COVID-19 complications in Burao, capital of Togdheer region, where he was buried the next day. He is survived by two wives and three children. Many dignitaries have given their condolences, including Somaliland president Muse Bihi Abdi, Somali president Farmaajo, former prime minister Mohamed Hussein Roble and Somali Regional State president Mustafe Cagjar.

== Works ==
- Illaahay ummaddii u ammaan geli
- Laxda
- Jinka
- Fuley Been Badanaa
- Aafada Tahriibka
