= Abdirisaq Ibrahim Abdi =

Somali politician

- Cabdirisaaq Ibraahim Cabdi
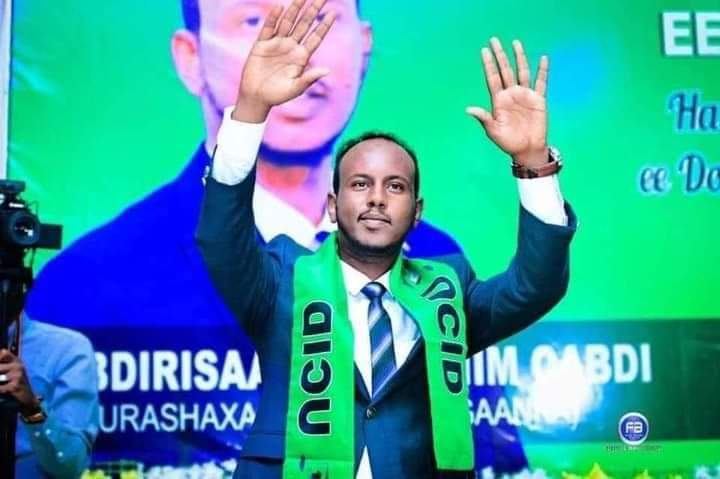

Mayor of Burao
- In office 20 June 2021 – 16 December 2023
- Preceded by: Mohamed Yusuf Abdirahman
- Succeeded by: Mohamed Hersi Ahmed

Personal details
- Party: UCID

Abdirisaq Ibrahim Abdi nicknamed Hero (Somali: Cabdirisaaq Ibraahin Cabdi) is a Somaliland politician, and the current Mayor of Burao, the capital and the largest city of Togdheer region of Somaliland since 20 June 2021. He succeeded Mohamed Yusuf Abdirahman on 20 June 2021 after the 2021 Somaliland municipal elections.

On 16 December 2023, he was succeeded by Mohamed Hersi Ahmed.

== See also ==
- Burao

Political offices
Preceded by Mohamed Yusuf Abdirahman	Mayor of Burao; 2021-2023	Succeeded by Mohamed Hersi Ahmed
