= Hadrawi =

Somalilander poet (1943–2022)

Mohamed Ibrahim Warsame Hadrawi
- Hadraawi (Somali); هدراوى (Arabic)
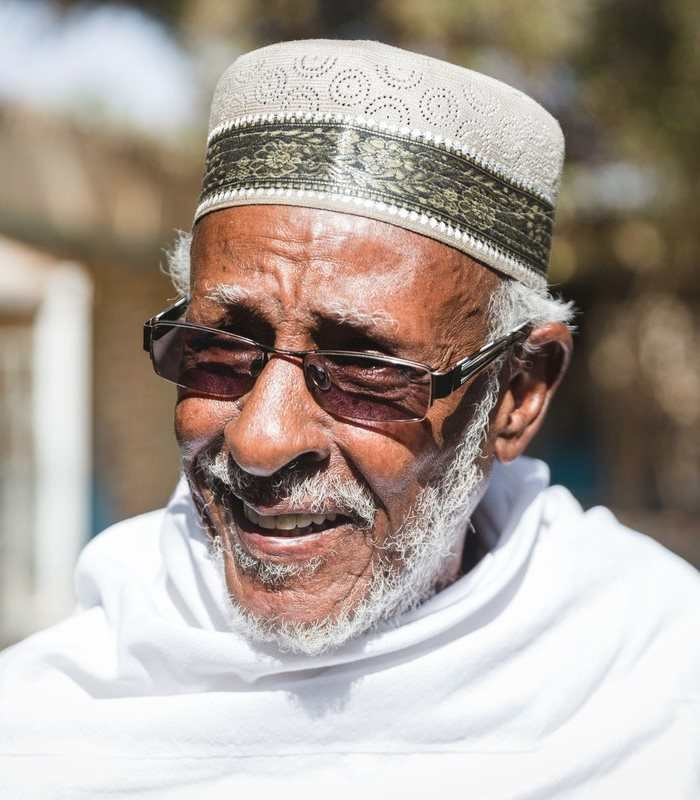
- Hadrawi in 2018
- Born: Mohamed Ibrahim Warsame; 1943; Balli-Alanle, Togdheer, British Somaliland
- Died: 18 August 2022 (aged 79); Hargeisa, Marodi Jeh, Somaliland
- Resting place: Hargeisa
- Education: Somali National University
- Occupations: Poet; author; songwriter; philosopher
- Relatives: Hurre Walanwal (brother)
- Writing career
- Pen name: Hadrawi
- Language: Somali
- Subjects: Patriotism, love, faith, mortality
- Notable works: Siinley Qoraa : Sayid Cali Barre; Tawaawac; Isa Sudhan; Sirta Nolosha; Hooya la'aanta
- Notable awards: Prince Claus Award (2012)

Mohamed Ibrahim Warsame (Note: Somali: Maxamed Ibraahim Warsame, Arabic: محمد ابراهيم ورسمي) (1943 – 18 August 2022), known by the pseudonym Hadrawi, (Note: Somali: Hadraawi, Arabic: هدراوي) was a Somali poet, philosopher and songwriter. Having written many notable protest works, Hadrawi has been likened by some to Shakespeare, and his poetry has been translated into various languages. He was the older brother of Hurre Walanwal, another Somali poet and songwriter.

== Biography ==
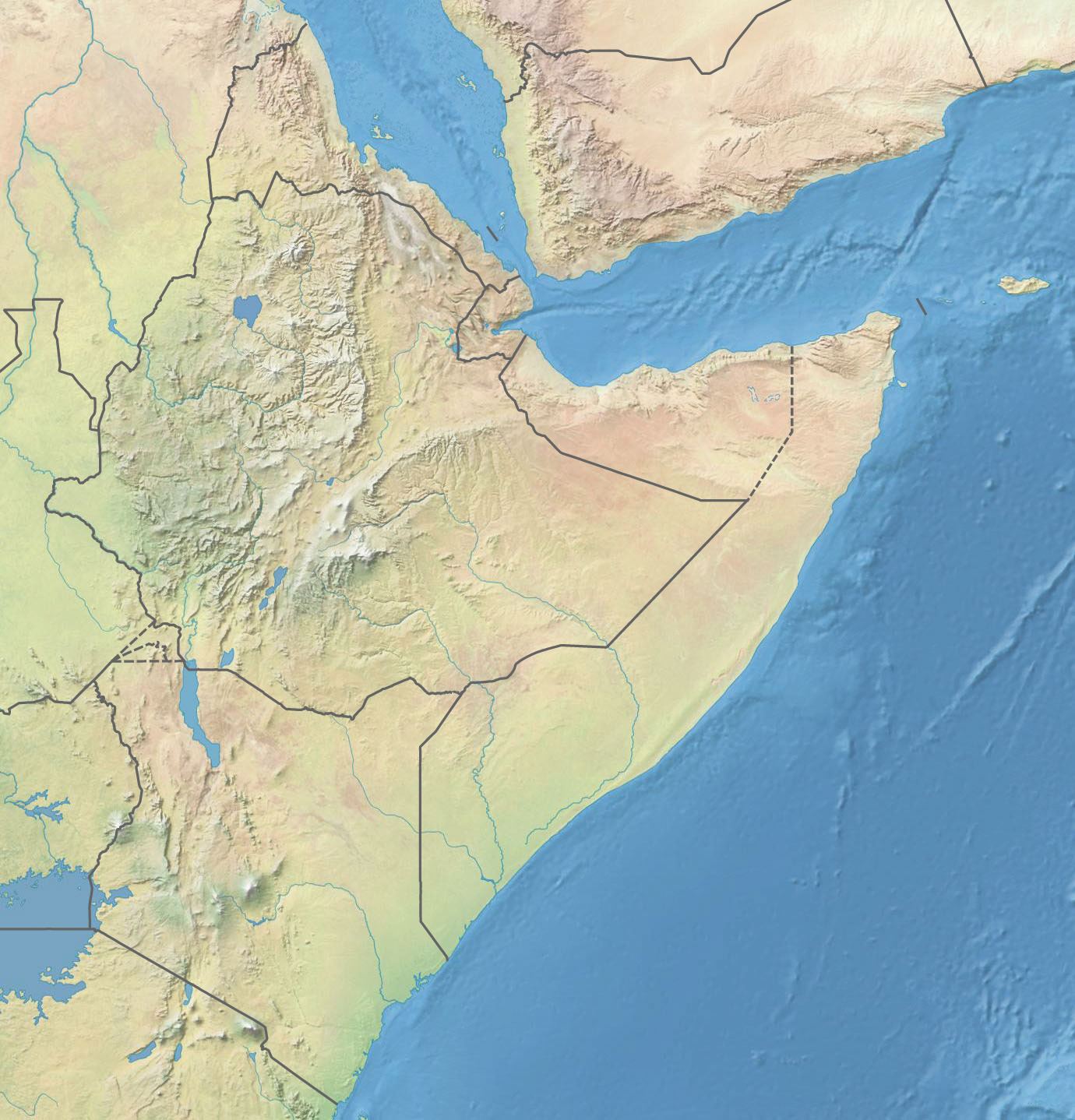
Relation map.

Hadrawi was born in Balli-Alanle near Qorilugud, situated in the Togdheer region of modern day Somaliland. According to another source, he was born in Burao. Hadrawi hailed from the Ahmed Farah sub-division of the Habr Je'lo Isaaq. His family consisted of one girl and eight boys. In 1953, at the age of nine, he went to live with an uncle in the Yemeni port city of Aden. There Warsame began attending a local school, where he received the nickname "Hadrawi" (Abu Hadra), a pseudonym by which he is now popularly known. In 1963, he became a primary school teacher.

== Return to The Somali Republic ==
In 1967, after graduating from high school, he returned to Somalia's capital Mogadishu, and began working for Radio Mogadishu. In Mogadishu, he both attended and later taught at the Lafoole University (Afgooye). He also worked for the government's Department of Information.

In 1968, his first play, HADIMO, was staged at the National Theater in Mogadishu, and he appeared in it himself.

In addition to love lyrics, he was a powerful commentator on the political situation and critic of the then military regime in Mogadishu (former Italian Somalia section) who allegedly oppressed the former portion of British Somaliland, for which he was imprisoned between 1973 and 1978.

In 1973, Hadrawi wrote the poem Siinley and the play Tawaawac ('Lament'), both of which were critical of the military government that was then in power. For this dissent, he was subsequently arrested and imprisoned in Qansax Dheere until April 1978. His work was banned in Somalia.

Following his release from prison in 1978, Hadrawi became director of the arts division of the Academy of Science, Arts and Literature in Somalia.

== Somali National Movement ==
In April 1982, he joined the Somali National Movement, an opposition group based in Ethiopia during the rule of Siad Barre. During the conflict, Hadrawi became known for poetry addressing political repression and the experiences of the Somali people. He continued to resist until Somaliland was finally liberated in 1991.

In 1993 (or 1991), Hadrawi relocated to the United Kingdom, and lived there for five years. During this period, he traveled frequently throughout Europe and North America to participate in folklore and poetry festivals.

In 2001 (or 1999), Hadrawi returned once more to his native Somaliland, this time settling in Hargeisa.

In the second half of 2003, he traveled throughout Somalia, preaching peace and nonviolence.

== Death ==
Hadrawi died in Hargeisa, Somaliland on 18 August 2022, at the age of 79.

== Contributions to popular music ==
Besides volumes of poems and dozens of plays, Hadrawi participated in numerous collaborations with popular vocal artists. His lyrical corpus includes:

- "Baladweyn" – song performed by Hasan Adan Samatar in 1974
- "Jacayl Dhiig ma Lagu Qoraa?" – sung by Magool, and later translated by Hanna Barket as "Is Love Written in Blood?" or "Do You Write Love in Blood?". Another translation of the song by the British linguist and Somali Studies doyen Martin Orwin is "Has Love Been Blood-written?".

== Awards ==
In 2012, Hadraawi was awarded the Prince Claus Award for his contributions to peace through poetry.

== Works ==
- Hooya la'anta ('Motherlessness')
- Beled Wayn
- Hablaha geeska
- Gudgude
- Siinley
- Sirta nolosha
- Tawaawac
- Aqoon iyo afgarad
- Deeley
- Hawaale warran
- Bulshooy

All the translations are by Poetry Translation Centre

== See also ==
- Salaan Carrabey
- Kite Fiqi

== General references ==
- "Abwaan Maxamed Ibraahim Warsame Hadraawi oo geeriyooday" [Poet Mohamed Ibrahim Warsame Hadrawi who died]. VOASomali.com (in Somali). 18 August 2022.
