= Kirit, Togdheer =

Kirit Kiridh
- Town
- Location in Somaliland Kirit (Somaliland)
- Coordinates: 8°58′49″N 46°7′45″E
- Country: Somaliland
- Region: Togdheer
- District: Burao District

Population (2019)
  - Total: 10,345
- Time zone: UTC+3 (EAT)

Kirit (Somali: Kiridh) is a town in the Burao District, in the Togdheer region of Somaliland. The town is 92 km southeast of Burao, the regional capital. It located on the road connecting Burao and Las Anod. It belonged to the Saraar region, which was temporarily established in Somaliland.

The town is home to a fort, constructed by the Dervishes led by Mohammed Abdullah Hassan.

== History ==
The Isaaq clan expanded into traditional Dhulbahante territory to the east. This expansion was led primarily by the Habr Je’lo subclan. The clan boundary between the Habr Je'lo and the Dhulbahante during the 19th century was traditionally in Laba Garday, a pass in the Buurdhaab mountain chain situated between War Idaad and Wadamago. The Dhulbahante had previously inhabited just east of Burao. The Habr Je'lo took advantage of the Dhulbahante's weakness after the defeat of the Dervish movement to conquer much of their important wells and grazing grounds. The Habr Je'lo subsequently expanded into and beyond the Saraar plain and the Ain Valley (which includes Kirit), pushing the Dhulbahante southwards towards the Haud:

Thus under pressure from the Habar Tol Ja'lo expanding to their north, the Dulbahante claim that formerly their north-western boundary was the Sarar Plain now grazed mainly by Habar Tol Ja'lo. And there is good evidence that they have in fact been forced to move south. Those Dulbahante lineages which formerly grazed in the Ain region and which were accordingly called Reer ‘Aymeed today pasture their stock mainly in the scrub-lands of the northern Hand where they are known as ‘people of the bush’ (Reer Oodeed).

— Ioan Lewis

=== Recent history ===
In August 2016, Somaliland's Minister of Third Country Resettlement, Minister of Education, and Minister of Livestock visited Kirit.

In March 2017, a major drought caused residents of nearby Indhodeeq and other areas to evacuate to Kirit. Kirit was also affected.

In August 2017, Muse Bihi Abdi, a candidate for president of Somaliland, visited Kirit.

In December 2017, Saraar police in Somaliland seized alcohol imported from Ethiopia in Kirit.

== Natural Environment ==
Collared lark is present along the road southward from between Kirit and Oog. Dibatag used to inhabit the area, but has not been seen recently.

== Demographics ==
In 2019 Kirit had an estimated population of 10,345.
