= Qoryale =

- Town
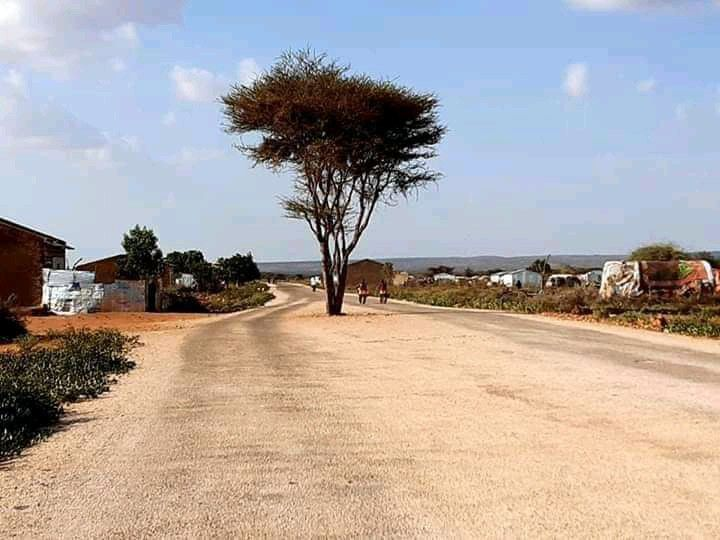
- The main tarmac road in Qoryale

- Location in Somaliland Qoryale (Somaliland)
- Coordinates: 9°4′8″N 45°58′13″E
- Country: Somaliland
- Region: Togdheer
- District: Burao District

Government
  - Mayor: Habib Igeh Hassan
- Time zone: UTC+3 (EAT)

Qoryale (Somali: Qoryaale) is a small town in the Togdheer region of Somaliland.

== Overview ==
Qoryale is located on Somaliland's main tarmac road that connects cities like Hargeisa, Berbera, Burao, Aynaba and Las Anod to neighbouring Somalia. The town itself is situated almost exactly at the center point between the city of Burao and the town of Aynaba, with a distance of 73km and 75km respectively.

Qoryale was founded in 1944 near a well and was and still is populated mainly by nomads from the surrounding area. Nearby is the Qoryooley wadi, of which the town gets its name from.

The estimated terrain elevation above sea level of Qoryale is 791m.

== Flora and fauna ==
Qoryale is home to a diverse set of bird species, including the buff-crested bustard, double-bounded corser and the chestnut-bellied sandgrouse, among many others.

== Demographics ==
As of 2015 Qoryale was home to roughly 800 families. It is primarily inhabited by the Ahmed Farah sub-division of the Habr Je'lo Isaaq.

== Education ==
The town is home to many primary and secondary schools, including the Qoryaale Boarding Secondary School. A secondary school was built in the town in recent years.

== Notable residents ==
- Ahmed Hurre Harriye - Commander of the Somaliland Coast Guard
