= Abdurahman Ahmed Ali =

Somali politician

Abdirahman Ahmed Ali عبدالرحمن أحمد علي

Governor of Awdal
- Incumbent
- Assumed office 30 January 2018
- President: Muse Bihi Abdi
- Preceded by: Mustafe Abdi Isse

Abdirahman Ahmed Ali (Somali: Cabdiraxmaan Axmed Cali) is a Somali politician, who is currently serving as the Governor of Awdal region of Somaliland since January 2018. In late January 2020, the religious leaders of the region accused him of insulting the religion (Islam), which is unlawful to the country's Law System, while the governor dismissed the allegations saying "I had no reason to insult the religion, since i am Muslim"

== See also ==
- Governor of Awdal
- Awdal Region

Political offices
Preceded by Mustafe Abdi Isse	Governor of Awdal; 2018-present	Incumbent
