= Nugaal (geography) =

Valley in Somalia

Nugaal Valley
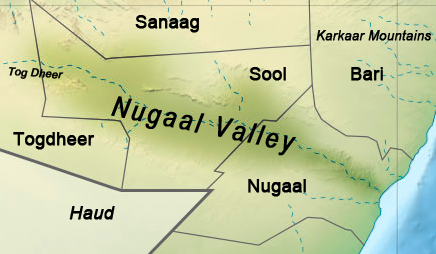
- Location in Somalia
- Length: 250 kilometres (160 mi) West-East
- Width: 10 to 100 kilometres (6.2 to 62.1 mi)

Geography
- Country: Somalia
- Coordinates: 8°27′42.41″N 48°3′15.12″E

The Nugaal (Somali: Dooxada Nugaal, Arabic: وادي نوجال), also called the Nugaal Valley/Nogal Valley, is a long and broad valley located in northern Somalia. The Nugaal Valley is bounded to the north by the Nugal Plateau and to the south by 'Iid.

== Overview ==
The Nugaal Valley is a key pastoral area which spans across four regions, Nugal and Bari in Somalia and Sool, Sanaag and Togdheer in Somaliland. Pastoral nomadism is the primary way of life for most of the people living in the valley. Goat and camel raising form the basis of the economy, and frankincense and myrrh are collected from wild trees. The beds of the watercourses have a few permanent wells, to which the predominantly nomadic population returns during the dry season. Low and erratic rainfall (about 5 inches 125 mm annually) and the high salinity of the soil limit crop cultivation. The segments of the Nugaal valley from Garowe eastwards is traditionally referred to as Bari Nugaaleed or Bari Nugaal, whilst segments of the valley which converge into the Iyah plains are called Jednugaal. Nonetheless, the latitudinal limits of Nugaal proper traditionally refers to the territory stretching from Garowe in the east until Saraar in the west.

== Geography ==
Extending 250 km along the Wadi Nugaal, the Nugaal Valley is bounded by gradually ascending high plateaus that generally reach elevations of 1,650 to 3,300 feet (500 to 1,000 m) above sea level on the north, west, and south. The western part of the same plateau is crossed by numerous valleys and dry watercourses. The same plateau sloping southwards merges with Hawd, a plain known for its grasslands. To the east is a narrow strip of low-lying maritime plains.

The valley's principal watercourses, the Nugaal and the more westerly Togdheer river, fill briefly during and after rainstorms (April to June) and drain into the Somali Sea. The upper part of the Nugaal is filled by the seasonal river known as Togdheer.

== Kobo ==
Towards the east, Nugaal Valley is bounded with Nugaaleed-Bari via the region known as Kobo. Kobo was described in colonial sources ruminating about the Darawiish strength as follows:

During all this time the Mullah and the majority of his karias (tribal encampments) had remained in the Eastern Nogal, in the area known as Kobo, roughly comprised in the triangle Halin, Gerrowei, Kallis. His strategical position here was a very strong one. It was secure from any possible danger of surprise, and he commanded the main routes to the south

— Colonel Kenna

== Sorl ==
The Sorl, also called the Nugaal plateau, is situated immediately above the Nugaal Valley and has been described in composition as similar to the Haud:

The Nogal is really a plain sunk in a limestone plateau, and access to the plateau, sometimes a thousand feet above it, is by rocky passes four to five miles apart, accessible to camels. The plateau north of the plain is called the Sorl, and seems, from what we know of it, which is very little, to resemble the Haud which bounds the plain on the south.

The Nugaal plateau, also called Sorl, has an elevation level of about 3000 feet:

The Nogal Plateau, or Sorl, which forms the northern limit of the Nogal Valley, has not been explored, but it apparently retains a uniform level of about 3000 feet.

== Flora and fauna ==
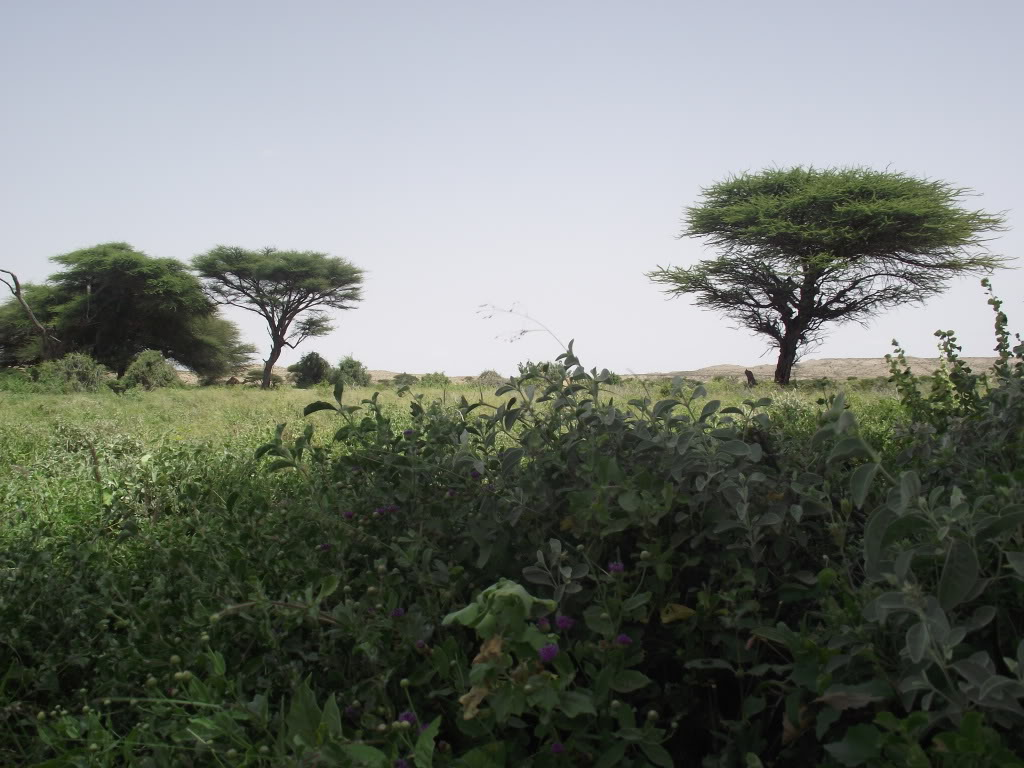
Grassland located in the Nugaal Valley.

The main vegetation in the Nugaal valley consists of open grasslands, shrubs (commiphora spp), Acacia trees and dominant grasses (indigofera spp). The valley is home to succulent flora and is particularly rich in local endemics. Gypsum hills located around Las Anod supports flora such as Aloe inermis, Dorstenia, Adenia, Raphanocarpus, Euphorbia, Pterodiscus, and Caralluma.

A Las Anod National Park has been proposed to protect the fine scenery, rich and varied flora, and the Somali wild ass. The limestone plateau north of Eyl has also been proposed as a national park due to its rich endemic flora.

== Oil exploration ==
Due to its proximity to the oil-rich Gulf Arab states such as Saudi Arabia and Yemen, the nation has also long been believed to contain substantial unexploited reserves of crude oil. Nugaal Valley Block has been identified as having reservoir, source rock and trap potential. International oil and gas companies conducted exploration in the late 1980s in the region. During this exploration phase, a grid of 2D seismic was shot perpendicular to the axis of the rift system in the Nugaal Basin. Based on interpreted maps this data shows a number of large, closed, fault-controlled structures.

Between them both, the Nugaal and Dharoor valley have only had 5 wells drilled, making the area one of the least explored areas in North Africa.

== See also ==
- Cal Madow
- Jubba Valley
- Shebelle Valley
