= Mayor of Burao =

Head of the government of Burao

Mayor of Burao City
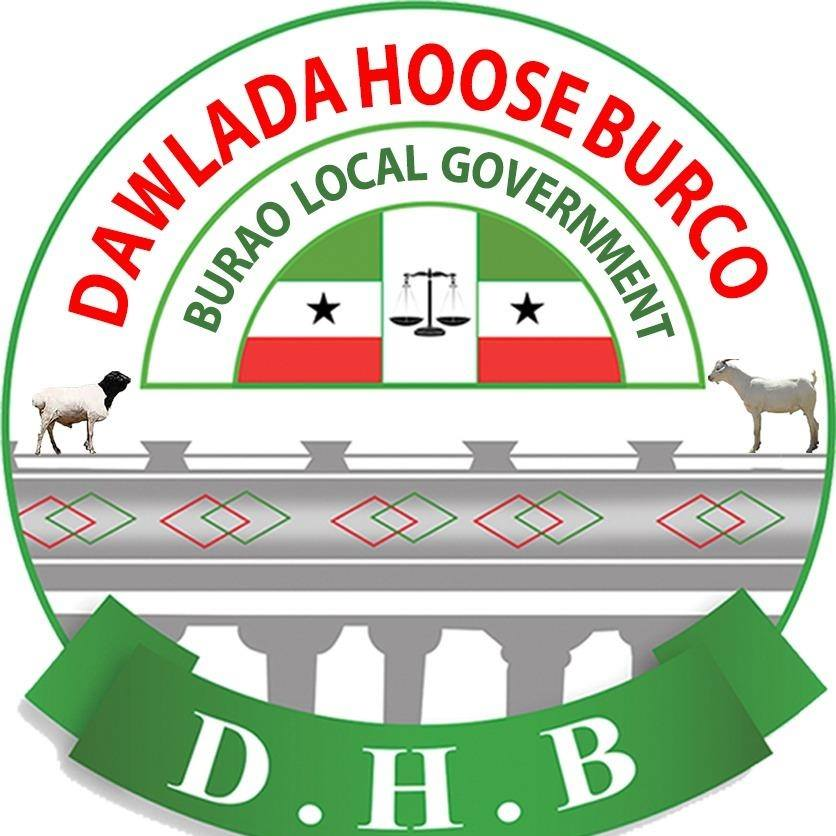

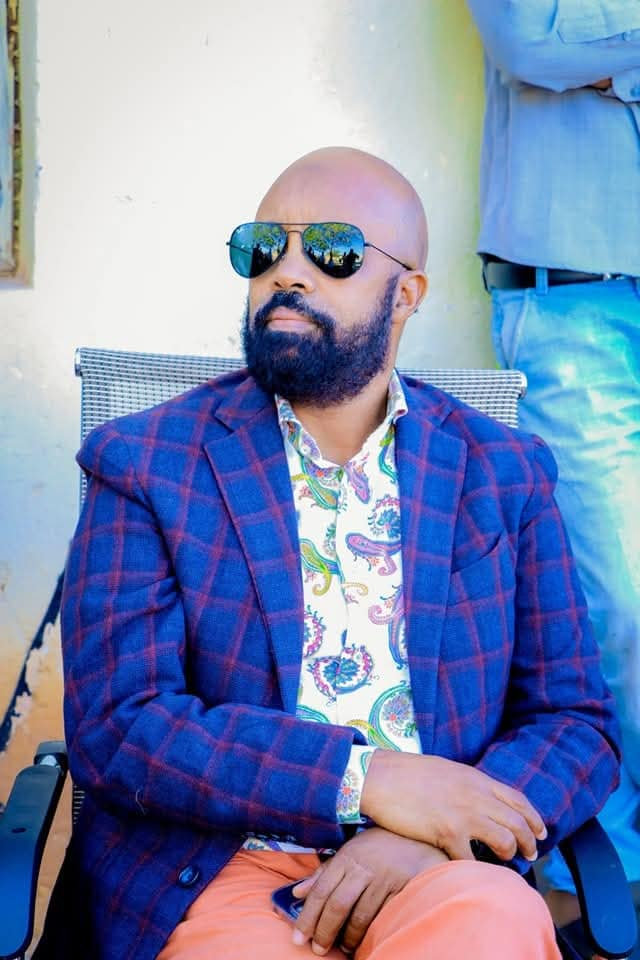
- Incumbent; Mohamed Hersi Ahmed since 16 December 2023
- Member of: Burao City Council
- Reports to: Burao City Council
- Seat: Burao City Hall
- Appointer: Burao City Council
- Deputy: Sultan Jama Nuh

The Mayor of Burao City is head of the executive branch of Burao City, the largest city in Togdheer Region of Somaliland. The current mayor is Mohamed Hersi Ahmed (Wa'ays), who was elected on 16 December 2023.

== List of mayors ==
Portrait	Name	Somali name	Term of office		
Portrait	Name	Somali name	Took office	Left office	Time in office
	Mohamoud Hashi Abdi	Maxamuud Xaashi Cabdi	18 May 1991	2002	11 years
	Mahamed Ali Mahamed	Maxamed Cali Maxamed		July 2002	
	Aden Mire Waqaf	Aadan Maxamed Waqaf	July 2002	November 2002	4 months
	Mahamud Diriye Hayd	Maxamuud Diiriye Xayd	15 December 2002		
	Abdi Ahmed Idle (Abdi Burco)	Cabdi Axmed Iidle (Cabdi Burco)			
	Mohamoud Hassan Dhagalab	Maxamuud Axmed Xasan (Maxamud Dhago laab)		15 December 2012	10 years, 0 days
	Mohamed Yusuf Abdirahman	Maxamed Yuusuf Cabdiraxmaan	15 December 2012	20 June 2021	8 years, 187 days
	Abdirisaq Ibrahim Abdi	Cabdirisaaq Ibraahim Cabdi	20 June 2021	16 December 2023	2 years, 179 days
	Mohamed Hersi Ahmed	Maxamed Xirsi Axmed	16 December 2023	Incumbent	2 years, 265 days

== See also ==
- Mayor of Berbera
- Mayor of Las Anod
- Mayor of Hargeisa
- Mayor of Erigavo
- Mayor of Borama
