= Jaamac Liibaan =

- Village
- Location in Somaliland Jaamac Liibaan (Somaliland)
- Coordinates: 8°57′50″N 45°43′17″E
- Country: Somaliland
- Region: Togdheer
- District: Burao District

Population (2006)
  - Total: 615
- Time zone: UTC+3 (EAT)

Jaamac Liibaan is a village in Burao District, in the Togdheer region of Somaliland.

== Demographics ==
In June 2006 Jaamac Liibaan had an estimated population of 615.
