= Hurre Walanwal =

Somalilander poet (1948–2023)

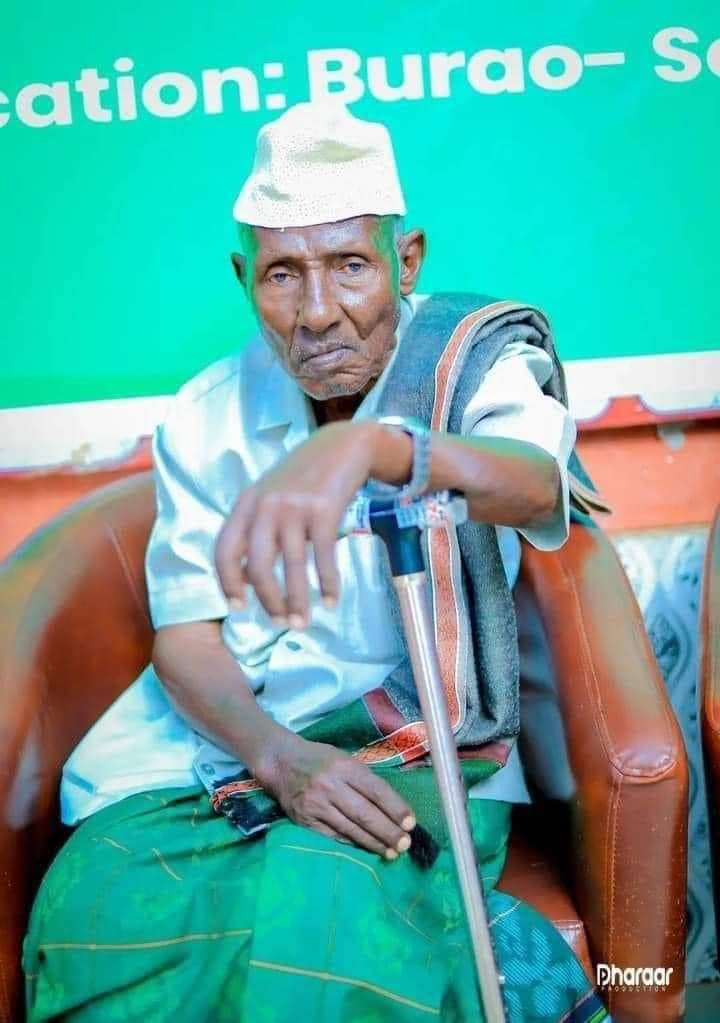
- Born: Osman Ibrahim Warsame; 1948; Aynaba, Sool, British Somaliland
- Died: 15 December 2023 (aged 75); Burao, Togdheer, Somaliland
- Occupations: Poet; author; songwriter; philosopher
- Children: 7
- Relatives: Hadrawi (brother)
- Writing career
- Pen name: Hurre Walanwal
- Language: Somali
- Notable works: Falaadh-bidix; Aflahaar

Osman Ibrahim Warsame (Somali: Cismaan Ibraahim Warsame), known by the pseudonym Hurre Walanwal was a renowned Somali poet, cultural icon, and key figure in Somali oral literature. Celebrated for his mastery of traditional jib and jaga songs—poetic forms central to Somali courtship and clan diplomacy—he played a pivotal role in preserving and modernizing Somali artistic heritage. Hurre was the younger brother of Hadrawi, another luminary of Somali literature.

== Early life and background ==
Hurre Walanwal was born in Aynaba, Sool region (modern-day Somaliland), in 1948, and belongs to the Habr Je'lo clan of the Isaaq clan-family. His pastoralist family belonged to the nomadic communities of the Saraar region, where he spent his early years immersed in the rhythms of rural life. At age 10, he transitioned to a semi-nomadic lifestyle, herding livestock and participating in communal gatherings that shaped his poetic sensibilities.

Hurre's upbringing in a household steeped in oral tradition laid the foundation for his career. By age 12, he began composing gabay (epic poems) and geeraar (short lyrical verses), drawing inspiration from the natural landscapes and social dynamics of nomadic life. His elder brother, Hadrawi, later described their shared childhood as one of resilience, shaped by the hardships and beauty of pastoralism.

== Career and artistic contributions ==
Hurre gained recognition in the 1960s as a member of the Orgi-naagood, a traveling troupe that performed traditional dances and songs at weddings and communal events. His improvisational skill in gole-kafuul—poems composed spontaneously during performances—set him apart. These works often blended humor, riddles, and social commentary, reflecting themes of love, marriage, and clan relations.

Hurre's poetry often addressed socio-political issues, including the Somali civil war and the erosion of traditional values. His 1996 poem Falaadh-bidix critiqued clan-based violence, while Aflahaar lamented the moral decay of political leadership. He also composed hees (songs) for communal rituals, such as Duug Reeb, which accompanied dances during the rainy season.

His style was characterized by vivid metaphors, alliterative phrasing, and a deep connection to Somali pastoral imagery. As his brother Hadrawi noted, Hurre's verses "emerged from the fog of nomadic life, carrying the weight of our shared history".

In 2009, a public tribute in Hargeisa honored Hurre and Hadrawi for their contributions to Somali literature. The event, organized by the cultural group Gudgude, highlighted Hurre's role in "safeguarding the soul of Somali identity".

== Personal life ==
Hurre married multiple times and fathered six sons and one daughter.

== Death ==
Hurre died on 15 December 2023 in Burao, Somaliland, aged 75.
