= Jama Haji Ahmed =

Somali politician

Jama Haji Ahmed جامع الحاج أحمد

Governor of Maroodi Jeex
- Incumbent
- Assumed office 30 January 2018
- President: Muse Bihi Abdi
- Preceded by: Abdillahi Jibril Gahnug

Jama Haji Ahmed (Somali: Jaamac Xaaji Axmed) is a Somali politician, who is currently serving as the Governor of Maroodi Jeex region of Somaliland since January 2018.

== See also ==
- Governor of Maroodi Jeex
- Maroodi Jeex Region

Political offices
Preceded by Abdillahi Jibril Gahnug	Governor of Maroodi Jeex; 2018-present	Incumbent
