= Ahmed Osman Hassan Elmi =

Somali politician

Ahmed Osman Hassan Elmi احمد عثمان حسن علمي

Governor of Sanaag
- Incumbent
- Assumed office 29 June 2020
- President: Muse Bihi Abdi
- Preceded by: Mohammed Ahmed Alin

Ahmed Osman Hassan Elmi (Somali: Axmed Cismaan Xasan Cilmi) is a Somali politician, who is currently serving as the Governor of Sanaag region of Somaliland since June 2020, replacing Mohammed Ahmed Alin.
