= Governor of Sanaag =

The Governor of Sanaag (Somali: Gudoomiyaha(or Guddoomiyaha, Badhasaabka) Gobolka Sanaag) is the chief executive of the Sanaag, leading the region's executive branch.

Sanaag's territorial claims are disputed between Somaliland and Puntland, with some areas not clearly belonging to either of them. Therefore, neither the governor of Sanaag in Somaliland nor the governor of Sanaag in Puntland governs the entire Sanaag region.

== Somalia ==
Name	Somali name	Term of office		
Name	Somali name	Took office	Left office	Time in office
Mohamud Muse Hersi	Maxamuud Muuse Xirsi Cadde	1974	1975	

== Somaliland ==
Governor of Sanaag
- Incumbent; Ahmed Abdi Muse Warsame since 1 Dec. 2021
- Style: The Honorable
- Term length: no term limit
- Formation: May 25, 1992

Governors of the regions in Somaliland is appointed to the office by the Somaliland president.

Name	Somali name	Term of office		
Name	Somali name	Took office	Left office	Time in office
Ali Abdi Hurre	Cali Cabdi Hurre	12 Aug. 2010(reappointment)	9 Jan. 2012	
Aden Diria Egal	Aaden Diiriye Cigaal	9 Jan. 2012		
Ahmed Muhumed Geelle	Axmed Muxumed Geelle (Dacar)	5 Feb. 2013		
Ahmed Abdi Falay	Axmed Cabdi Falay	8 Feb. 2015	30 Jan 2018	2 years, 356 days
Mohammed Ahmed Alin	Maxamed Axmed Caalin Yuusuf	30 Jan. 2018	29 Jun. 2020	2 years, 151 days
Ahmed Osman Hassan Elmi	Axmed Cismaan Xasan Cilmi	29 Jun. 2020	11 Sep. 2021	1 year, 74 days
Mohammed Elmi Hussein Ahmed	Maxamed Cilmi Xuseen Axmed	11 Sep. 2021	1 Dec. 2021	81 days
Ahmed Abdi Muse Warsame	Axmed Cabdi Muuse Warsame	1 Dec. 2021	Incumbent	4 years, 280 days

== Puntland ==
Name	Somali name	Term of office		
Name	Somali name	Took office	Left office	Time in office
Mohamed Nuur Said (Dabayl)	Maxamuud Siciid Nuur Dabeyl	2000	9 Oct. 2012	12 years
Mahamud Ismail Iyon	Maxamuud Ismaaciil Jaamac Ciyoon	Nov. 2012	Jun. 2019	6 years, 7 months
Ali Hussein Somali	Cali Xuseen Soomaali	18 Jul. 2019	23 Feb. 2021	1 year, 220 days
Ahmed Jama Badmax	Siciid Axmed Jaamac (Badmaax)	23 Feb. 2021	Incumbent	5 years, 196 days

== See also ==
- Sanaag
- Politics of Somaliland
