= Mohamed Hersi Ahmed =

Mayor of Burao, Somaliland

- Maxamed Xirsi Axmed محمد حرسي أحمد
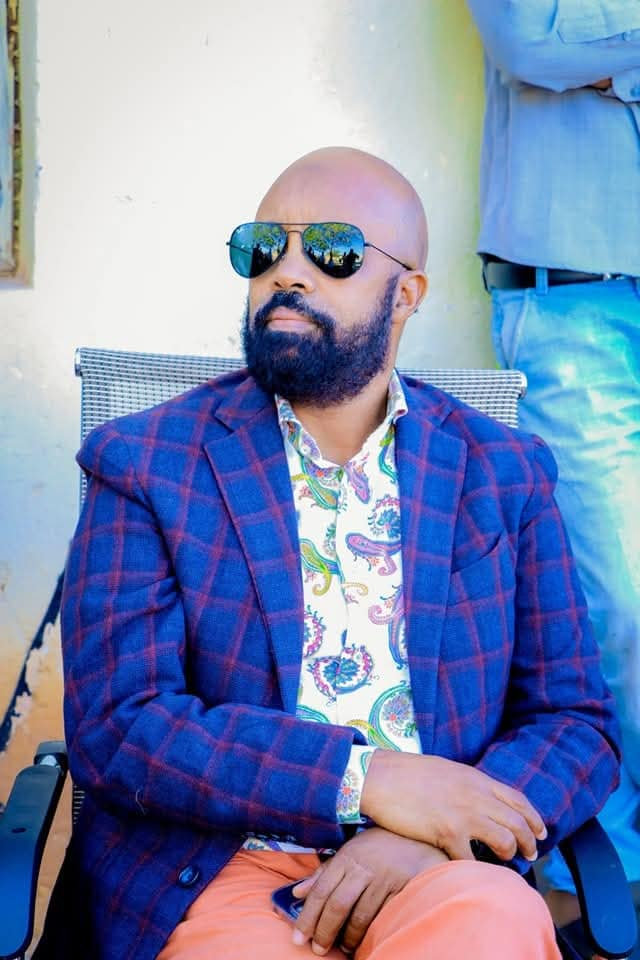
- Mohamed in 2025

Mayor of Burao
- Incumbent
- Assumed office 16 December 2023
- Preceded by: Abdirisaq Ibrahim Abdi

Personal details
- Party: Waddani

Mohamed Hersi Ahmed (Somali: Maxamed Xirsi Axmed, Arabic: محمد حرسي أحمد) also known as Mohamed 'Ase (Somali: Maxamed Case) is a Swedish-Somaliland politician and the current Mayor of Burao, Somaliland, elected on 16 December 2023.

== Political career ==
Mohamed was elected by a vote of 7 to 6 by the Burao Local Council on 16 December 2023, alongside Suldan Jama Nuh, who serves as Deputy Mayor after the previous mayor Abdirisaq Ibrahim Abdi was suspended following persistent requests from council members. Described as a quiet, religious, and slow-moving man, Mohamed is an expatriate who has lived in the country for several years, having returned home from Sweden, where he had been living for a while.

Mohamed Hirsi Ahmed is estimated to be in his early fifties, and became a member of the Burco local council when he was elected after the 2021 Somaliland municipal elections.

Political offices
Preceded by Abdirisaq Ibrahim Abdi	Mayor of Burao; 2023-present	Incumbent
