= Yirowe =

Town in Togdheer, Somaliland

Yirowe Yiroowe يروه
- Town
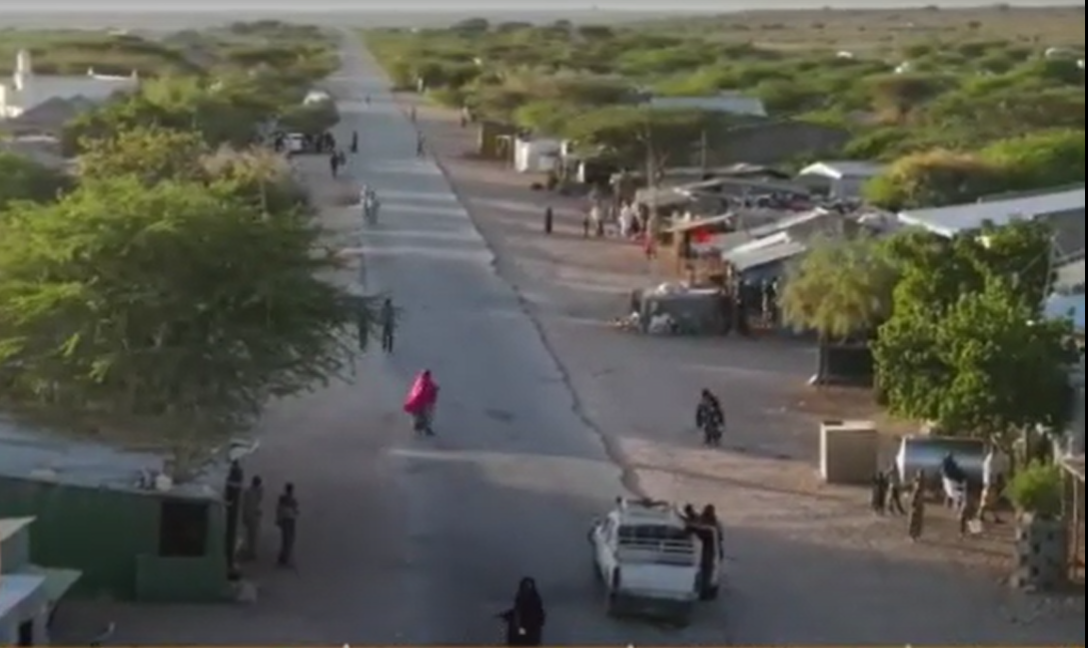
- Drone footage of Yirowe

- Location in Somaliland Yirowe (Somaliland)
- Coordinates: 9°25′0″N 45°43′0″E
- Country: Somaliland
- Region: Togdheer
- District: Burao District
- Time zone: UTC+3 (EAT)

Yirowe, also spelt Yerrowa, Yerowa, Yeroweh or Yerowah (Somali: Yiroowe, Arabic: يروه) is a town in the Burao District, located in the Togdheer region of Somaliland. The town is located 20 km east of Burao, the provincial capital of the Togdheer region.

== Overview ==
The town is known for the rocky hills that surround it and is home to the largest livestock market, known in Somali as seylad, in the Horn of Africa, with as many as 10,000 head of sheep and goats sold daily, many of whom shipped to Gulf states via the port of Berbera. The livestock market of Yirowe handles up to 70% of all sheep and goats exported and 65% of all camels exported from Berbera. The market handles livestock from all over the Horn of Africa.

The town's central location serves as a hub that connects the nomadic interior of Somaliland and major cities like Burao, Erigavo, Aynaba and Las Anod to Somaliland's capital Hargeisa and its main port in Berbera.

Yiroowe also contains a branch of the Indha Deero company, one of the largest companies operating in Somaliland.

== Demographics ==
Yiroowe was the site of a camp that hosted civilians and nomads that fled during land disputes but has since grown to become a significantly sized market town. The town is primarily inhabited by the Ahmed Farah sub-division of the Habr Je'lo Isaaq.
