= Somaliland Coast Guard =

Coast guard of Somaliland

- Ciidanka Ilaalada Xeebaha Somaliland خفر سواحل صوماليلاندي
- Somaliland Coast Guard colour party on parade
- Founded: 2 October 1995; 31 years ago
- Country: Somaliland
- Type: Coast guard
- Role: Maritime law enforcement; Search and rescue; Coastal defence
- Size: ~600 (IISS, 2024); ~1,500 (government claim, 2026); 9 boats
- Part of: Somaliland Armed Forces
- Headquarters: Hargeisa and Berbera
- Nickname: SLCG
- Anniversaries: 2 October
- Website: marines.govsomaliland.org

Commanders
- Commander: Admiral Ahmed Hurre Haariye

Insignia
- Emblem

- Flag

- Racing stripe

The Somaliland Coast Guard (SLCG; Somali: Ciidanka Ilaalada Xeebaha Somaliland; Arabic: خفر سواحل صوماليلاندي) is the maritime law enforcement, search and rescue and coastal defence branch of the Somaliland Armed Forces. It was founded on 2 October 1995 and is headquartered in Hargeisa, with its main operating base at Berbera. The force is commanded by Admiral Ahmed Hurre Haariye, who was appointed on 29 June 2022.

The International Institute for Strategic Studies estimated the coast guard's strength at around 600 personnel in 2024. In September 2026, President Abdirahman Mohamed Abdullahi stated that the coast guard numbered some 1,500 personnel.

== History ==
In 2011 the coast guard was poorly equipped, operating two 20-foot motorboats and armed with AK-47 rifles and RPG-7 launchers. Over the following decade it received seven Defender-class boats from Italy and Sweden, along with vehicles and equipment from the European Union. The force has also been trained with support from the United Kingdom and the EU's EUCAP Somalia mission, including a course on the Indian Ocean Region Information Sharing (IORIS) platform held in Hargeisa in January 2026.

According to its commander, the coast guard held 158 training sessions between October 2024 and October 2025. In 2026 it announced the Berbera Secure Approach Protocol, under which it provides maritime escorts to ships sailing to the port of Berbera.

== International cooperation ==
In July 2025 the Somaliland Coast Guard signed a cooperation agreement with Taiwan's Coast Guard Administration. A delegation from Taiwan's Ocean Affairs Council visited the coast guard's headquarters in December 2025 to take the agreement forward, with talks covering maritime surveillance, training, information-sharing and capacity-building. In August 2026 Admiral Haariye was part of a Somaliland delegation that held defence talks with United States Africa Command in Germany.

== Budget ==
The coast guard was allocated SLSh 36.3 billion in the 2026 national budget, an increase of 30% on the SLSh 28.0 billion allocated in 2025.

== Equipment ==
=== Vessels ===
Ship type	Number	Acquired	Origin	Image	Status
20-foot motorboat	2	pre-2011	Domestic		In service
Defender-class	4	2017	Italy		In service
Defender-class	3	2018	Sweden		In service

== Ranks ==
Rank group	General / flag officers	Senior officers			Junior officers
Somaliland Coast Guard
Somaliland Coast Guard	Admiraal guuto	Gashaanle sare	Gashaanle dhexe	Gashaanle	Dhamme	Laba xídígle	Xídígle

== Gallery ==
Coast guard sailors marching in Hargeisa

Coast guard contingent on parade

== See also ==
- Somaliland Armed Forces
- Somaliland National Army
- Somaliland Police Force
