= Dur-Dur Band =

Somali musical group

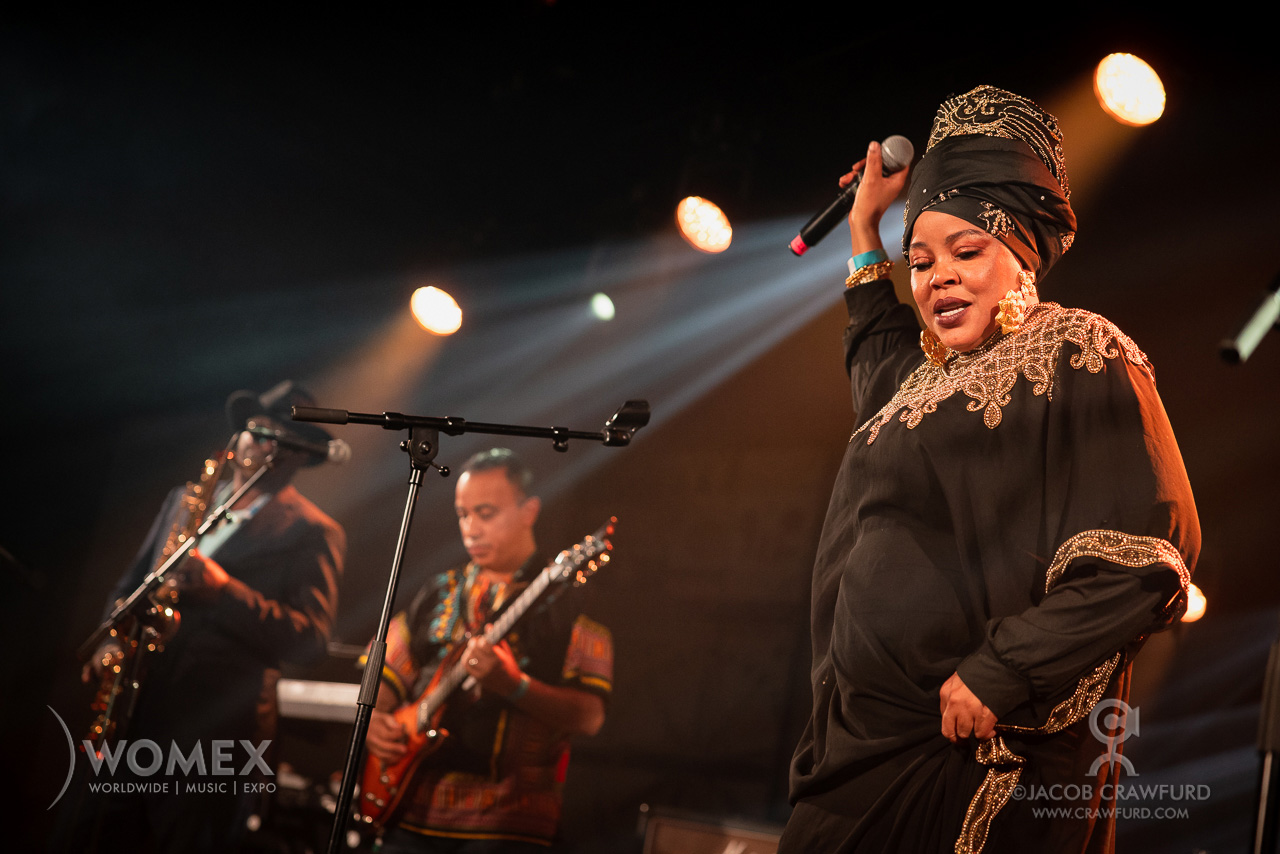
- Dur-Dur Band in 2025

Background information
- Origin: Mogadishu, Somalia
- Genres: Funk, Soul, Disco
- Years active: 1980s–1990s

The Dur-Dur Band (dur dur meaning 'spring' in Somali) was a musical group from Mogadishu, Somalia. The band debuted in the 1980s and was one of the most well-known acts on the Mogadishu disco scene at the time. Their sound encompassed funk and disco, with influences of soul. The band has recently undergone a resurgence in popularity following the use of their music for a TikTok trend.

== History ==
=== 1980s ===
Inspired by artists such as Michael Jackson, Bob Marley, and Santana, as well as Bollywood music, Dur-Dur Band emerged during a time when Somalia's distinctive contribution to the creative culture in the Horn of Africa was visible and abundant. Thousands of recordings, made at the Somali National Theatre, Radio Mogadishu, and other studios, were used by the nightclubs at Hotel Juba, Jazeera Palace Hotel, and Hotel al-Curuuba, creating a flourishing music scene. Somalia is an oral society, and its citizens often express their feelings and anxieties through poems, singing, dancing, music, and dramatic storytelling.

The Dur-Dur Band became famous in Somalia in the mid-80s, with lead singers including Sahra Dawo, Abdinur Aden Daljir, Pastow, Eddi, Shimali, Qomal and other vocalists. They took Somali pop culture by storm, and were also popular in the neighboring countries of Ethiopia, Djibouti, and Kenya.

=== 1990s ===
The Dur-Dur Band disbanded when civil war broke out in Somalia in 1991, forcing several members to flee the country. After this, the band was based in Addis Ababa, Ethiopia. The group recorded several albums and released almost a dozen recordings before the musicians emigrated to countries such as Djibouti and the United States, while some remained in Ethiopia.

The founders of the band, Eise Dahir Qasim, Abdillahi Ujerry, and Sahra Dawo, currently live in Ohio. Sahra Dawo was married to Eise Dahir, but later separated and remarried Abdinur Daljir. Many Somali musicians fled the country to seek sanctuary outside Somalia, mainly in East Africa and Europe, with many executed or killed by the religious factions for their dedication to music and cultural expression.

=== Revival of interest ===
Dur Dur Band International is a London-based homage or revival band, co-founded by original bassist Abdillahi Ujeeri and Liban Noah in September 2011.

In March 2013, the record label Awesome Tapes From Africa re-released their 1987 cassette release Volume 5 in LP, CD, and cassette formats. The album received wide critical acclaim from music critics.

In November 2014, Dur-Dur Band reunited for a single performance at The Cedar Cultural Center in Minneapolis, Minnesota, following a week-long artist residency as part of the "Midnimo" Somali cultural program.

In 2019, Noah and his Dur Dur Band International organized a special tribute concert in Berlin’s House of World Cultures, dubbed The Berlin Session and later compiled as a live album.

"Gorof (Elixir)"
"Gorof (Elixir)" gained traction online in 2025.

In September 2025, their song "Gorof (Elixir)" gained worldwide traction after being used in a viral TikTok video. This led to many videos with millions of likes using the song and sparked discussions on Reddit among users who were unfamiliar with the band until discovering them on TikTok.

== Band members ==
By 1987, Dur-Dur Band's line-up featured:

- Sahra Abukar Dawo – vocals
- Abdinur Adan Daljir – vocals
- Mohamed Ahmed Qomal – vocals
- Abdukadir Mayow Buunis – vocals
- Abukar Dahir Qasim – guitar
- Abdillahi Ujeeri – bass guitar
- Yusuf Abdi Haji Aleevi – guitar
- Ali Dhere – trumpet
- Muse Mohamed Araci – saxophone
- Abdul Dhegey – saxophone
- Eise Dahir Qasim – keyboard
- Mohamed Ali Mohamed – bass
- Adan Mohamed Ali Handal – drums
- Ooyaaye Eise and Ali Bisha – congas
- Mohamed Karma, Dahir Yaree and Murjaan Ramandan – backing vocals
- Ibrahim Ismail Sugulle (Sooraan) – lyricist.

== Partial discography ==
=== Somali Releases ===
- 1986 - Rafaad iyo Raaxo
- 1986 - Volume 1
- 1987 - Volume 2
- 1987 - Volume 5
- 1991 - Africa

=== International Releases ===
- 2013 - Volume 5 – Awesome Tapes From Africa
- 2018 - Dur-Dur of Somalia - Volume 1, Volume 2 & Previously Unreleased Tracks – Analog Africa
- 2023 - Dur-Dur Band Int - The Berlin Session – Out Here Records

=== Featured On ===
- 2019 - Mogadisco - Dancing Mogadishu // Somalia 1972-1991 (Analog Africa Nr. 29)
