= Mohammed Ahmed Alin =

Somali politician

Mohammed Ahmed Alin محمد احمد عالم
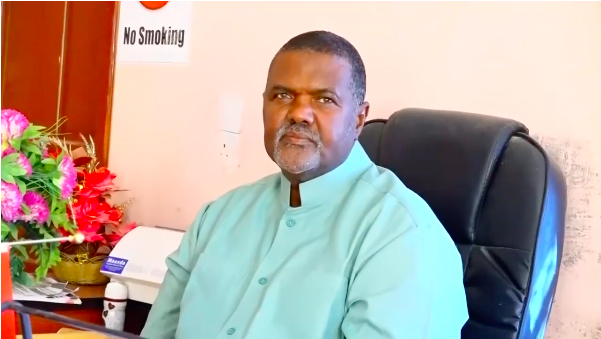

Governor of Maroodi Jeex
- Incumbent
- Assumed office 25 June 2023
- President: Muse Bihi Abdi
- Preceded by: Mahamed Cilmi Ahmed Mahamuud

Governor of Awdal
- In office 29 June 2020 – 25 June 2023
- President: Muse Bihi Abdi
- Preceded by: Abdirahman Ahmed Ali Muse
- Succeeded by: Hassan Dahir Haddi

Governor of Sanaag
- In office 30 January 2018 – 29 June 2020
- President: Muse Bihi Abdi
- Preceded by: Mustafe Abdi Isse
- Succeeded by: Ahmed Osman Hassan Elmi

Mohammed Ahmed Alin Yusuf (Somali: Maxamed Axmed Caalin Yuusuf), also known as Tiimbaro, is a Somaliland politician who is currently serving as the Governor of Maroodi Jeex region since 25 June 2023.

He also served as the Governor of Awdal region of Somaliland between 29 June 2020 and 25 June 2023.

Tiimbaro also served as the Governor of Sanaag region of Somaliland from January 2018 to June 2020.

== See also ==
- Maroodi Jeex Region

Political offices
| Preceded by Mohammed Elmi Ahmed | Governor of Maroodi Jeex; 2023-present | Incumbent |
