= Togdheer River =

River in Somaliland

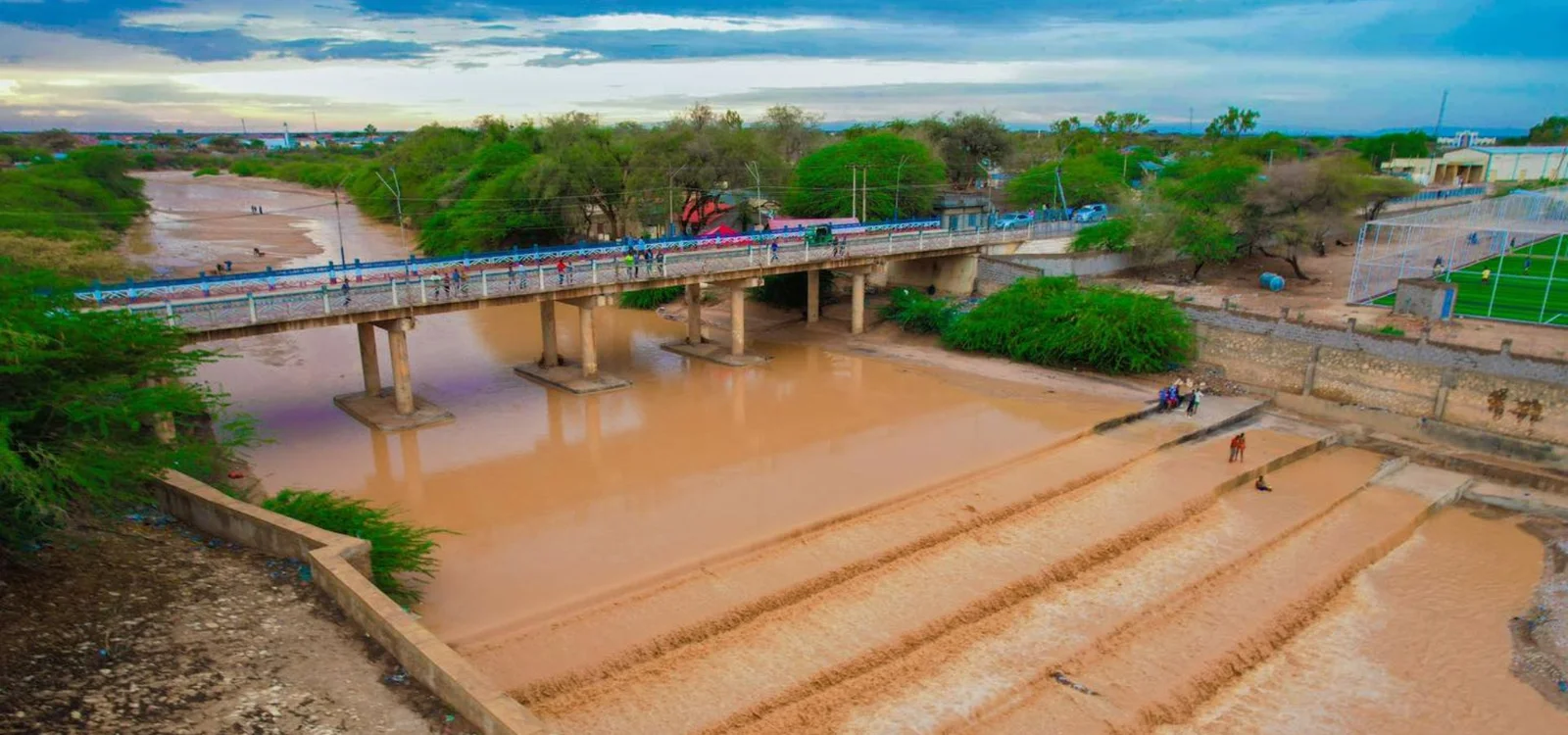
- The Togdheer seasonal river in Burao, Somaliland
- Native name: Webiga Togdheer (Somali)

Location
- Countries: Somaliland

Physical characteristics
- Source
  - location: Golis Mountains
  - coordinates: 9°52′0″N 44°55′0″E
- Mouth
  - location: Nugaal Valley
  - coordinates: 8°27′42.41″N 48°3′15.12″E

The Togdheer River (Somali: Webiga Togdheer) is a seasonal river in the Togdheer region of central Somaliland. The region is named after the river. The river's name comes from "Tog" (which means "riverbed" in the Somali language) and "dheer" (Somali for "long").

The Togdheer River rises in the foothills of the Golis Mountains, specifically the upper slope of the Ga'an Libah reserve, flows south through the city of Burao, where it splits the city in half, and then vanishes into the eastern plains of the Togdheer region and the northern part of Sool, where it provides winter sustenance to the arid Nugaal valley. The riverbed is usually dry, but is subject to flooding when heavy rains fall in the mountains.

== Exploration ==
British explorer John Hanning Speke during his 1854 visit to Somaliland described the Togdheer as a very fertile and beautiful valley, and which forms a flood during the rains that flows towards the Indian Ocean:

Between the two lies a large watercourse, called "Tuk Der", or the Long River. It is dry during the cold season, but during the rains forms a flood, tending towards the Eastern Ocean. This probably is the line which in our maps is put down as "Wady Nogal, a very fertile and beautiful valley."

Another British explorer, Frank Linsly James, describes the river during his exploratory visit to Somaliland in 1884:

We had then marched thirteen miles, and were encamped near the "Tug Dayr", or Long River, by some wells named Goolooly. The Tug Dayr is only a "river" during the rainy season, but it is always "long". How long I could not discover; but after leaving the Habr Gerhajis country it extends in a westerly direction through the Habr Tdjaleh tribe, and on through the Dolbohanti country, then through the Nogal district, and widening out, reaches the sea-coast north of Jarad.

James, a guest of Sultan Awad Deria during his visit to Somaliland, describes a performance he witnessed by Habr Yunis Horsemen at the Togdheer in Burao:

During our stay at Burao, the Sultan collected a great many of his people together, and twice entertained us with some well-executed and characteristic evolutions on horseback. On the first occasion some forty mounted men were collected in the Tug before our zariba; but this did not satisfy the Sultan, and he arranged a second "fan- tasia," in which fully two hundred warriors were engaged. It was the best and most characteristic thing of the kind I had ever seen. A procession was first formed in the river's bed, and on a given signal all dashed off, brandishing their spears and shields. Dressed in tobes of many colours, and sitting loosely on their gaily caparisoned horses, they engaged in mimic contest with spear and shield, reining their horses upon their haunches when at full gallop, and with wild shouts flinging their spears into the air. Each warrior carried a short-handled whip with a broad raw hide thong, and with it lashed his steed unmercifully. Some of the riders went through regular circus feats, leaping from their horses when at full gallop, picking up objects thrown on the ground, and then remount- ing. After this had continued for some time they would gallop close to our zariba, and reining up, shout "Mort, mort" ("Welcome, welcome"), to which we replied, "Kul liban" ("Thanks").
