= Burao District =

Burao District Degmada Burco
- District
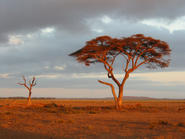

- Location of Burco district within Togdheer, Somaliland
- Country: Somaliland
- Region: Togdheer
- Capital: Burao

Population (2005)
  - Total: 288,211
- Time zone: UTC+3 (EAT)

Burao District (Somali: Degmada Burco) is a district of the Togdheer region in central Somaliland. Its capital lies at Burao.

== Overview ==
The district is home to some of the largest livestock markets, known in Somali as seylad, in the Horn of Africa, with as many as 10,000 heads of sheep and goats sold daily in the markets of Burao and Yirowe, many of whom shipped to Gulf states via the port of Berbera. The markets handle livestock from all over the Horn of Africa.

== Major cities and towns ==
- Burco
- War Cimraan
- Balidhiig
- Yirowe
- Beer
- Dabaqabad
- Jaamac Liibaan
- Qoryaale
- Odanleh
- Qalloocan
- Warta- Shacabi
- Kirit
- Waraabeeye, Togdheer
- Bisiqa
- Harada
- Ceeg
- Cali Saahid
- Sanyare
- Durukhsi
- Xaaji Saalax, Togdheer
- Kaba-Dheere
- Aroori,
- Cali faarax
- Cali Ciise

== See also ==
- Administrative divisions of Somaliland
- Regions of Somaliland
- Districts of Somaliland
- Somalia–Somaliland border
