= Governor of Awdal =

Head of Somaliland region of Awdal

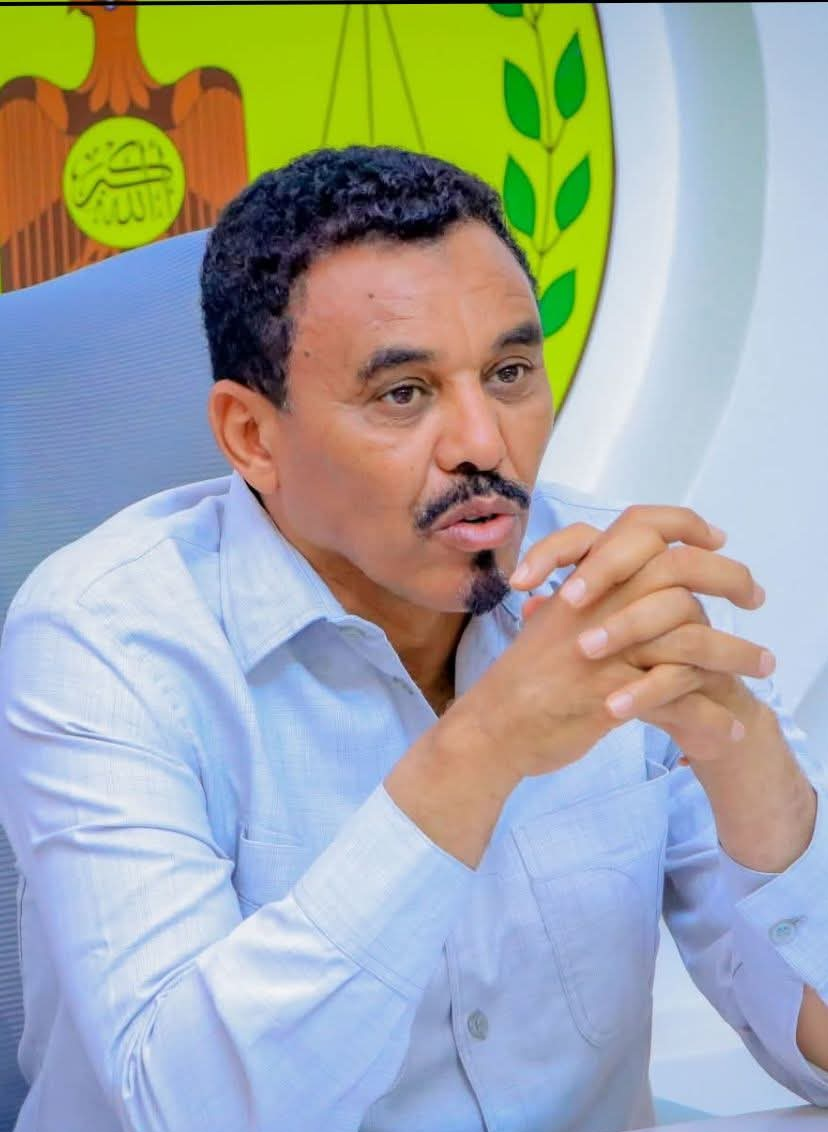
- Incumbent; Muhumed Hassan Jama since January 21, 2025
- Style: The Honorable
- Term length: no term limit
- Formation: May 25, 1992

The Governor of Awdal is the chief executive of the Somaliland region of Awdal, leading the region's executive branch. Governors of the regions is appointed to the office by the Somaliland president. The current governor of Awdal is Muhumed Hassan Jama

== List of governors ==
Name	Somali name	Term of office	
Name	Somali name	Took office	Left office
Dahir Riyale Kahin	Daahir Riyaale Kaahin	1992	
Bashir Farah Kawye		29 Jul. 1996	Muxumed Aw-jibriil Fahiye
Mohamed Muse Bahdoon, Mohamed Musa Bahdon		Apr. 2002	
Mahamud Sheik Abdilahi Ige	Maxamuud Sheekh Cabdillaahi Cige		31 Jul. 2010
Ahmed Hadi Sidii			5 Feb. 2013
Abdo Ahmed Ayer	Cabdoo Axmed Aayer	5 Feb. 2013	Feb. 2015
	Maxmuud Cali Saleebaaan Ramaax	Feb. 2015	15 Aug. 2016
Mustafe Abdi Isse (Shine)	Mustafe Cabdi Ciise (Shiine)	15 Aug. 2016	Sep. 2017
Abdillahi Jibril Gaaxnuug (Buraale)	Cabdillaahi Jibriil Gaaxnuug (Buraale)	10 Sep. 2017	
Abdirahman Ahmed Ali Muse	Cabdiraxmaan Axmed Cali Muuse	29 Jan. 2018	29 June 2020
Mohammed Ahmed Alin Timbaro	Maxamed Axmed Caalin Yuusuf	29 June 2020	25 June 2023
Hassan Dahir Haddi	Xasan Daahir Xaddi	25 June 2023	Incumbent

== See also ==
- Awdal
- Politics of Somaliland
