= Balidhiig =

Balidhiig Balidhiig (Somali) بليديج (Arabic) Balli Dhiig
- Town
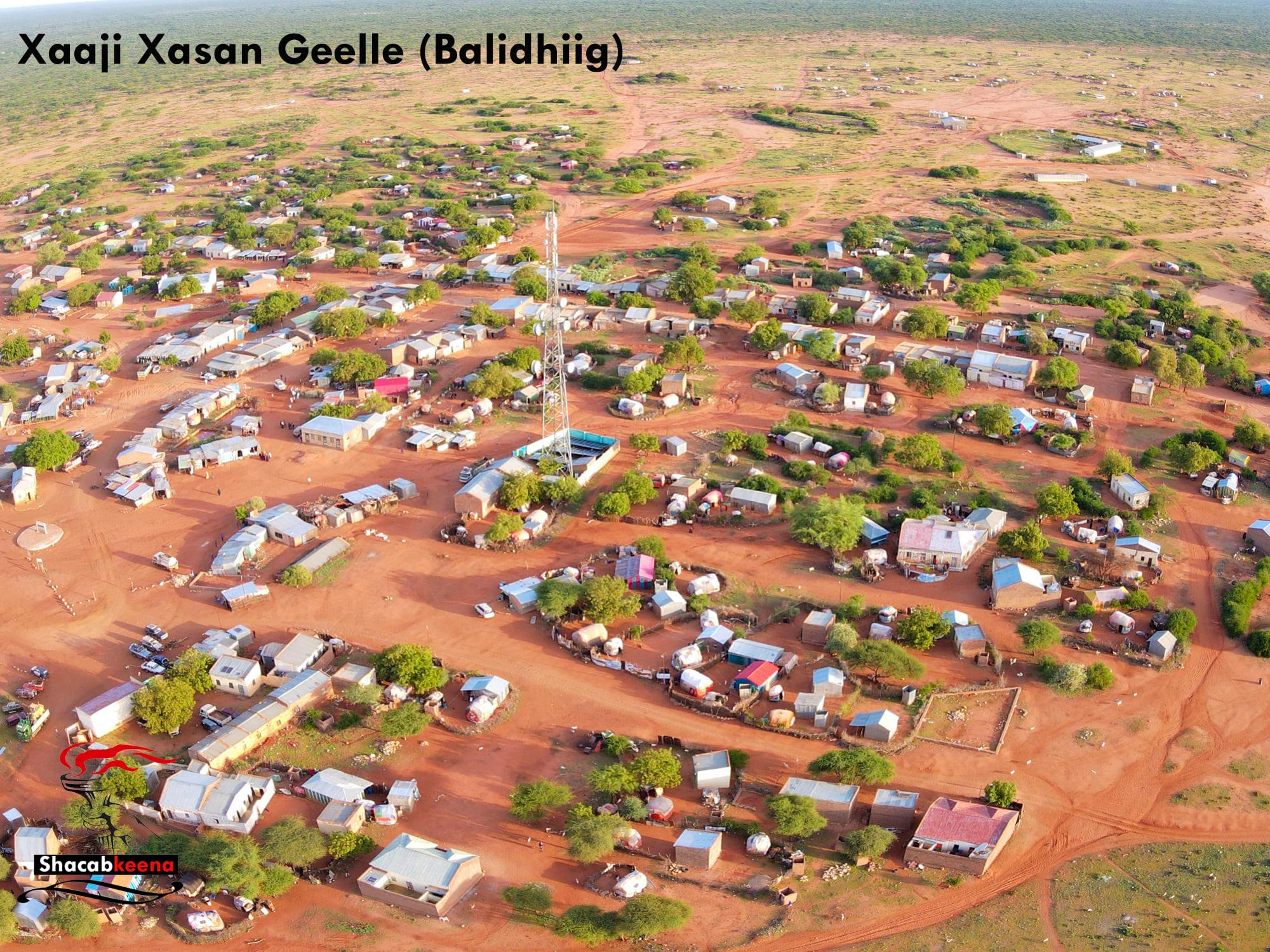

- Location in Somaliland Balidhiig (Somaliland) Balidhiig (Ethiopia)
- Coordinates: 8°22′03.3″N 45°55′09.9″E
- Country: Somaliland
- Region: Togdheer
- District: Burao

Population (2002)
  - Total: 23,000
- Time zone: UTC+3 (EAT)
- Climate: BWh

Balidhiig, also known as Balli Dhiig (Somali: Balidhiig, Arabic: بليديج) is a town in the Togdheer region of Somaliland, on the border of Somaliland and Ethiopia.

== Demographics ==
In 2002 the town of Balidhiig has an estimated population of 23,000 residents.

== See also ==
- Administrative divisions of Somaliland
- Regions of Somaliland
- Districts of Somaliland
- Somalia–Somaliland border
- Battle of Balidhiig
