= Battle of Balidhiig =

- Part of the Somaliland War of Independence
Date	February 1987
Location	Balidhiig
Result	Government victory
Territorial changes	SNM invasion successfully repelled by the Somali National Army

Belligerents
Somalia	Somali National Movement

Commanders and leaders
Mohamed Said Hersi Morgan	Ahmed Mohamed Mohamoud

Units involved
26th division	Somali National Movement

Casualties and losses
30 killed	500+ casualties 380 total killed 40 captured many wounded

The Battle of Balidhiig was a combined air and ground attack on the border town of Balidhiig in Somalia's Togdheer region. The SNM operating from bases in Ethiopia, provided the ground component of the assault against positions held by the SNA.

== Battle ==
General Morgan commanding SNA forces, successfully repulsed the attack, resulting in 300 Ethiopian troops killed. His troops defeated the combined Ethiopian–SNM offensive and captured 11 Ethiopian tanks. The US department of defense concluded that the attack was soundly defeated.

''The most significant incident during 1987 was a brigade-sized cross border attack by Ethiopian regulars and SNM dissidents in the vicinity of Balleh Dig, a small village in northern Somalia in February. This attack was soundly defeated.''

The SNM suffered approximately 80 fatalities during the battle.SNM forces also attacked six Somali refugee camps in the area (primarily housing women and children), resulting in approximately 300 fatalities.

== Aftermath ==
The defeat at Bali Dhig intensified existing factional tensions within the SNM and led to internal purges and armed infighting. In 1987 the SNM leadership purged members, particularly those from the Habar Yunis and Habar Jeclo subclans, whom it suspected of collaborating with the Siad Barre government. Further clashes broke out between anti-Silanyo and pro-Silanyo factions inside the SNM; these internal fights resulted in the deaths of approximately 90 SNM fighters.

A contemporary CIA assessment noted that the SNM had taken heavy casualties in the combined assault on the Somali garrison at Balli Digh in February 1987 and that recruitment suffered significantly after the demoralizing defeat. The same assessment observed that SNM factional squabbling had probably discouraged potential recruits and, in some cases, led to assassination attempts by rival leaders.
