= Governor of Maroodi Jeex =

Head of Somaliland region of Maroodi Jeex

- Incumbent; Mohammed Ahmed Alin since June 25, 2023
- Style: The Honorable
- Term length: no term limit
- Formation: May 25, 1992

The Governor of Maroodi Jeex is the chief executive of the Somaliland region of Maroodi Jeex, leading the region's executive branch. Governors of the regions are appointed to the office by the Somaliland president. The current governor of Maroodi Jeex is Mohammed Ahmed Alin.

== See also ==
- Maroodi Jeex
- Politics of Somaliland
