= Burao =

City in Togdheer region, Somaliland

Burao Burco (Somali) برعو (Arabic)
- City
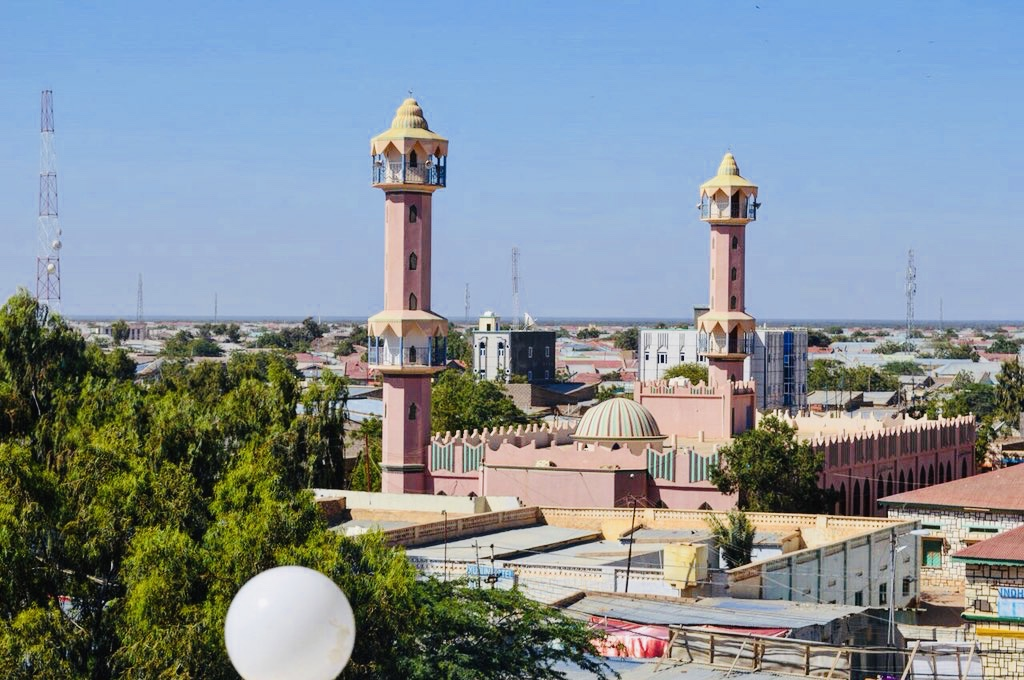
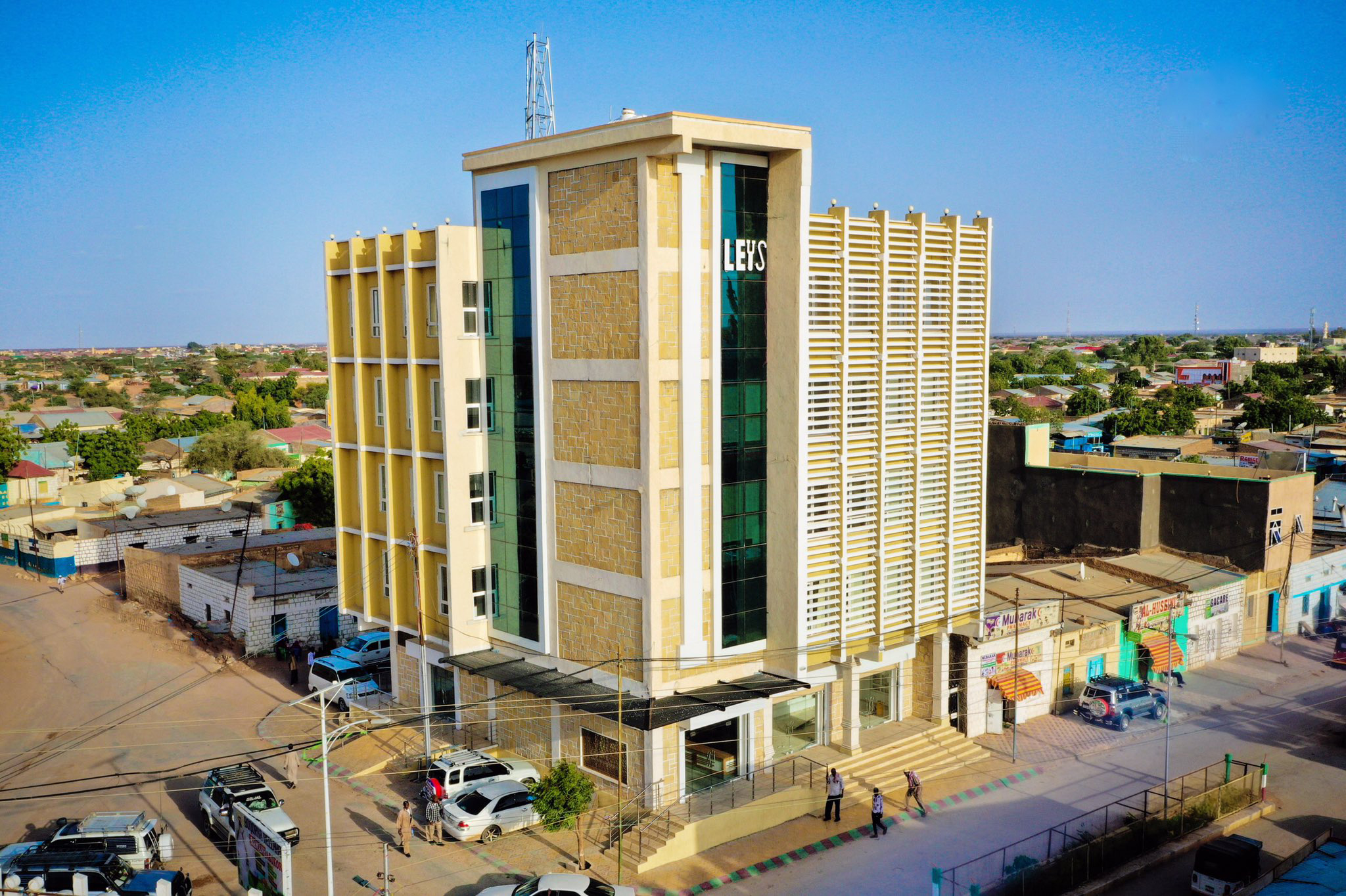
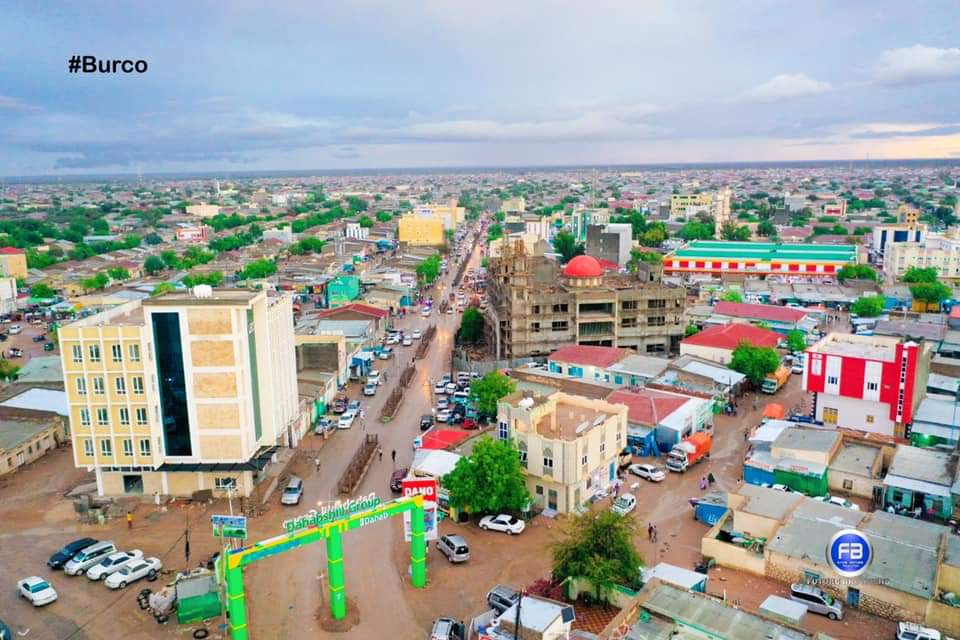
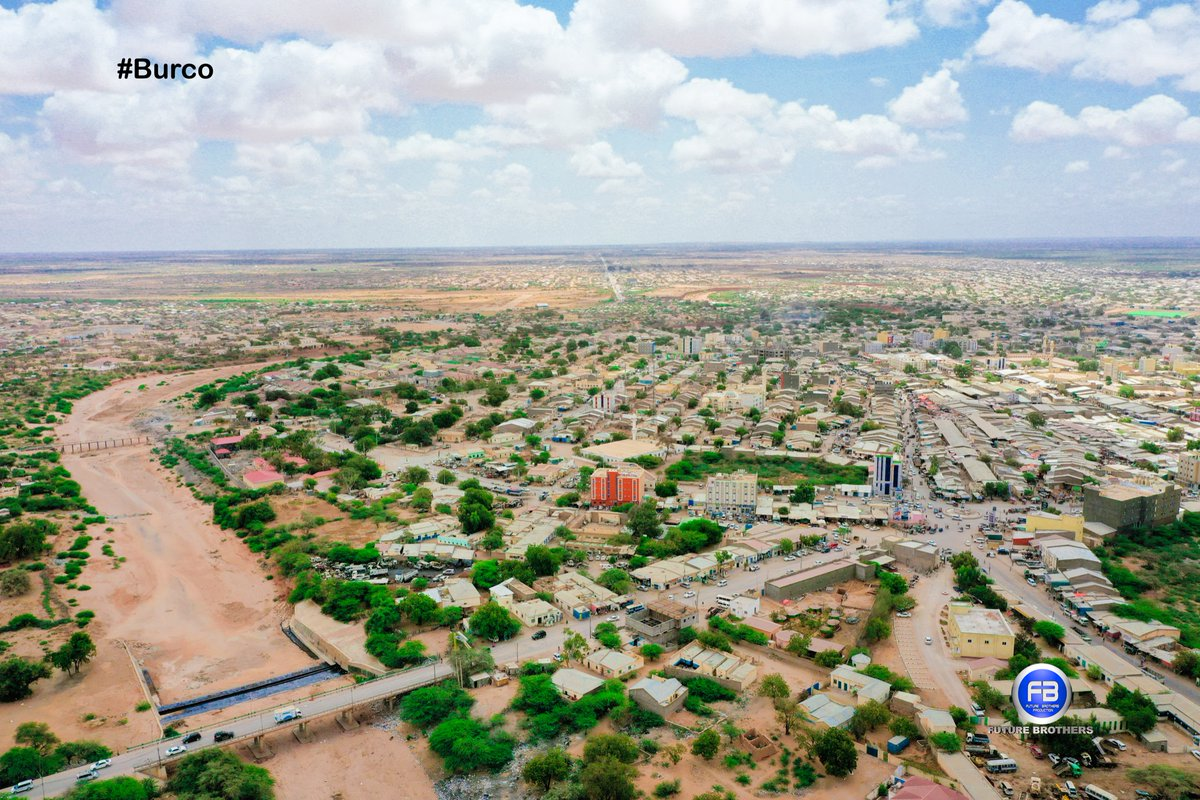
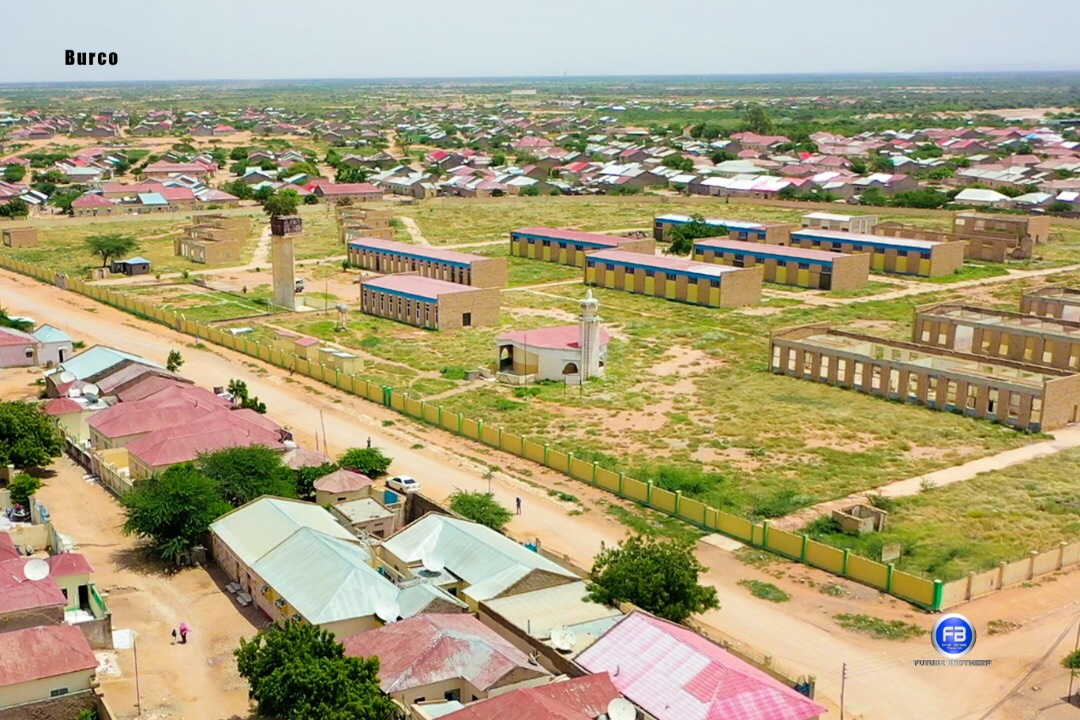
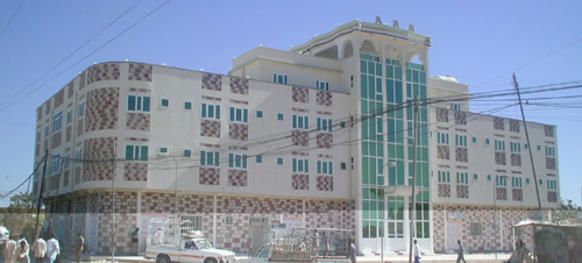

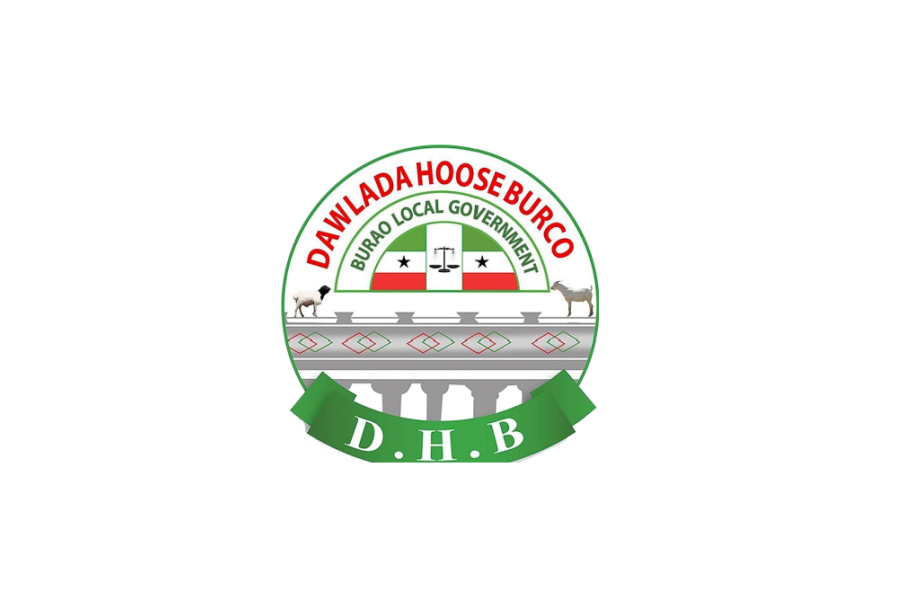
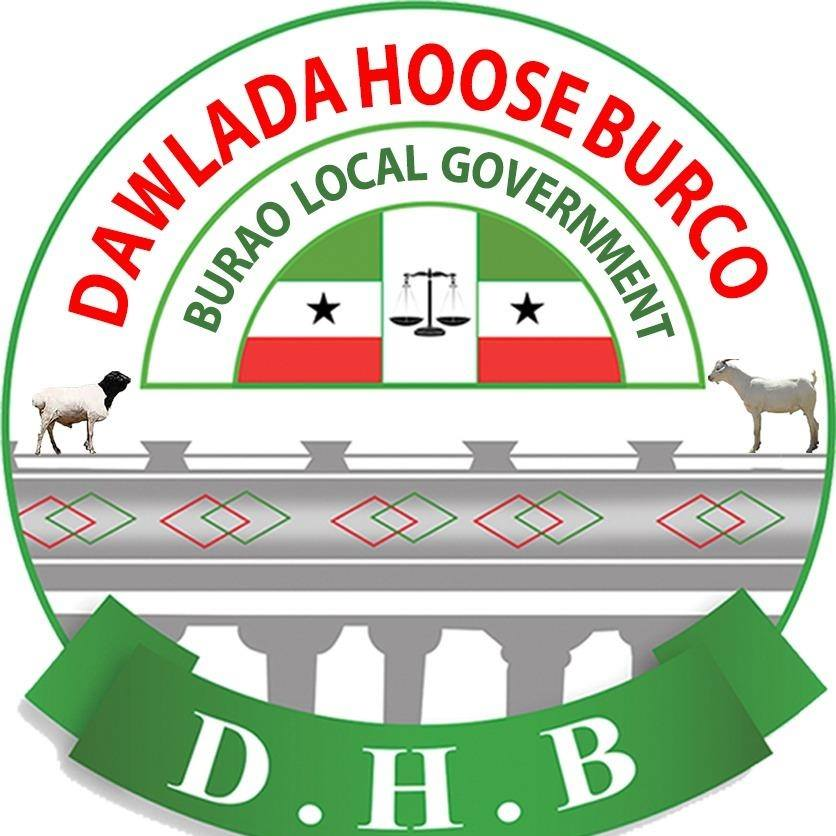
- Flag Seal
- Interactive map of Burao
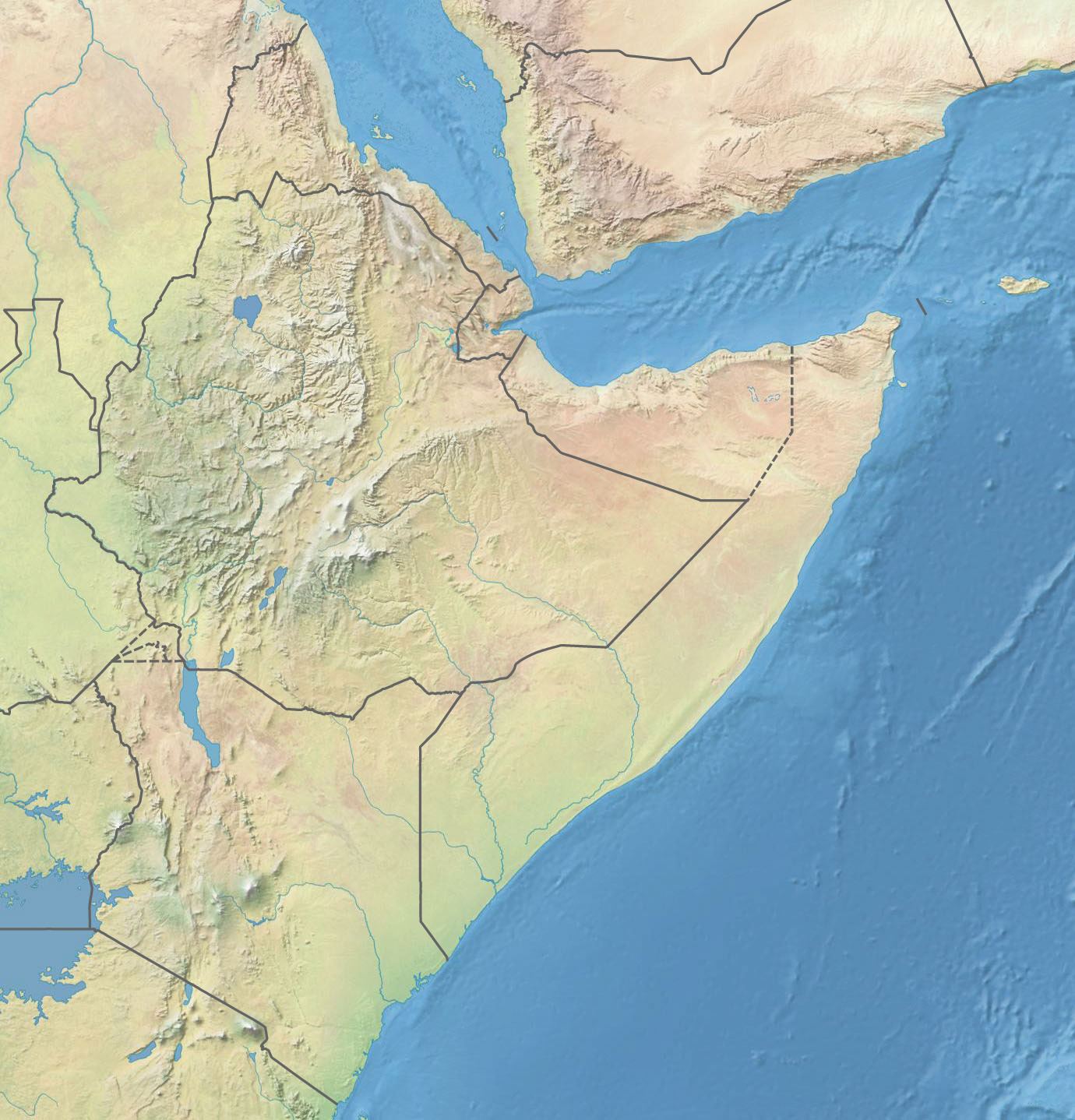
- Location in Somaliland Burao (Somaliland) Burao (Horn of Africa) Burao (Africa)
- Coordinates: 09°31′40.4″N 45°32′04.2″E
- Country: Somaliland
- Region: Togdheer
- District: Burao District
- First settled: Late 18th century
- Establishment: 1910

Government
  - Mayor: Mohamed Hersi Ahmed (Waddani)

Area
  - Total: 38 km^{2} (15 sq mi)
- Elevation: 1,037 m (3,402 ft)

Population (2023)
  - Total: 425,764
  - Rank: 2nd
- Demonym(s): Burcaawi برعاوي
- Time zone: UTC+3 (EAT)
- Climate: BWh
- Website: burao.org

Burao, also spelt Bur'o or Bur'ao (Burr-OH; Somali: Burco, IPA: [Burˈʕo], Arabic: برعو), is the capital of the Togdheer region and the second largest city in Somaliland. Burao was the site of the declaration of an independent Somaliland on 18 May 1991.

== Etymology ==
The word burco describes open, elevated land which has soft/rich soil, with the Burao area being considered fertile.

== History ==
The city originated as a well named Ceel-Gooni in the late 18th century used by nomads from the surrounding area. The town subsequently grew around the well. Due to the availability of water along the dry valley, Burao developed into a small inland market hub that linked the port of Berbera with the hinterland and offered trading facilities for the region's nomadic population. The settlement was later on burned to the ground by British forces in 1900, with the modern settlement being re-established in 1910.

For much of the 19th century, Burao served as the capital of the Habr Yunis Sultanate. Sultan Nur Ahmed Aman, Sutan Awad Deria and Sultan Madar Hersi ruled from Burao at different periods of time.

After leaving the Berbera coastlands and ascending the escarpments of the great inland plateau, the convoy followed the valley of the Tug Dayr as far as Burao, capital of a powerful but friendly Habr Gerhaji sultan.

Explorer Frank Linsly James, a guest of Sultan Awad Deria during his visit to Somaliland in 1884, describes a performance he witnessed by Habr Yunis Horsemen at Burao's Togdheer River.

During our stay at Burao, the Sultan collected a great many of his people together, and twice entertained us with some well-executed and characteristic evolutions on horseback. On the first occasion some forty mounted men were collected in the Tug before our zariba; but this did not satisfy the Sultan, and he arranged a second "fan- tasia", in which fully two hundred warriors were engaged. It was the best and most characteristic thing of the kind I had ever seen. A procession was first formed in the river's bed, and on a given signal all dashed off, brandishing their spears and shields. Dressed in tobes of many colours, and sitting loosely on their gaily caparisoned horses, they engaged in mimic contest with spear and shield, reining their horses upon their haunches when at full gallop, and with wild shouts flinging their spears into the air. Each warrior carried a short-handled whip with a broad raw hide thong, and with it lashed his steed unmercifully. Some of the riders went through regular circus feats, leaping from their horses when at full gallop, picking up objects thrown on the ground, and then remount- ing. After this had continued for some time they would gallop close to our zariba, and reining up, shout "Mort, mort" ("Welcome, welcome"), to which we replied, "Kul liban" ("Thanks").

=== Dervish movement ===
The Dervish movement was founded in Burao in 1899. In the end of late August of that year the Dervish leaders and their clan followers assembled at Burao, Mohammed Abdullah Hassan with his followers from the Dhulbahante, the various Habar Jeclo sub clans with their principle headman Haji Sudi, and Sultan Nur Ahmed Aman with his followers from the Habr Yunis clan, declared open hostility. The assembled Dervish and their clan allies sent the following stern letter to Captain Cordeauxe and James Hayes Sadler:

"This is to inform you that you have done whatever you have desired, and oppressed our well-known religion without any cause. Further, to inform you that whatever people bring to you they are liars and slanderers. Further, to inform you that Mahomed, your Akil, came to ask from us the arms we therefore, send you this letter. Now choose for yourself; if you want war we accept it, if you want peace pay the fine." September 1, 1899.

=== Burao tax revolt and RAF bombing ===
The people of Burao clashed with the British in 1922 after a heavy tax was imposed upon them. They revolted in opposition to the tax and this caused them to riot and attack British government officials. In the ensuing disturbances a shootout between the British and Burao residents broke out; Captain Allan Gibb, a Dervish war veteran and district commissioner, was shot and killed. The British, fearing they could not contain the revolt, requested that Secretary of State for the Colonies Sir Winston Churchill send troops from Aden and bomber aircraft in order to bomb Burao and the livestock of the revolting clans to quell any further rebellion. The RAF planes arrived at Burao within two days and proceeded to bomb the town with incendiaries, effectively burning the entire settlement to the ground.

Telegram from Sir Geoffrey Archer, Governor of British Somaliland to Sir Winston Churchill the Secretary of State for the Colonies:

I deeply regret to inform that during an affray at Burao yesterday between Rer Sugulleh and Akils of other tribes Captain Gibb was shot dead. Having called out Camel corps company to quell the disturbance, he went forward himself with his interperter, whereupon fire opened on him by some Rer segulleh riflemen and he was instantly killed..Miscreants then disappeared under the cover of darkness. In order to meet the situation created by the Murder of Gibb, we require two aeroplanes for about fourteen days. I have arranged with resident, Aden, for these. And made formal application, which please confirm. It is proposed they fly via Perim, confining sea crossing to 12 miles. We propose to inflict fine of 2,500 camels on implicated sections, who are practically isolated and demand surrender of man who killed Gibbs. He is known. Fine to be doubled in failure to comply with latter conditions and aeroplanes to be used to bomb stock on grazing grounds.

Sir Winston Churchill reporting on the Burao incident in the House of Commons:

On 25th February the Governor of Somaliland telegraphed that an affray between tribesmen had taken place at Burao on the previous day, in the course of which Captain Allan Gibb, D.S.O., D.C.M., the District Commissioner at Burao, had been shot dead. Captain Gibb had advanced with his interpreter to quell the disturbance, when 1954 fire was opened upon him by some riflemen, and he was instantly killed. The murderers escaped under cover of falling darkness. Captain Gibb was an officer of long and valued service in Somaliland, whose loss I deeply regret. From the information available, his murder does not appear to have been premeditated, but it inevitably had a disturbing effect upon the surrounding tribes, and immediate dispositions of troops became necessary in order to ensure the apprehension and punishment of those responsible for the murder. On 27th February the Governor telegraphed that, in order to meet the situation which had arisen, he required two aeroplanes for purposes of demonstration, and suggested that two aeroplanes from the Royal Air Force Detachment at Aden should fly over to Berber a from Aden. He also telegraphed that in certain circumstances it might become necessary to ask for reinforcements of troops to be sent to the Protectorate.

James Lawrence author of Imperial Rearguard: Wars of Empire writes

[Gibb]..was murdered by rioters during a protest against taxation at Burao. Governor Archer immediately called for aircraft which were at Burao within two days. The inhabitants of the native township were turned out of their houses, and the entire area was razed by a combination of bombing, machine-gun fire and burning.

After the RAF aircraft bombed Burao to the ground, the leaders of the rebellion acquiesced, agreeing to pay a fine for Gibb's death, but they refused to identify and apprehend the accused individuals. Most of the men responsible for Gibb's shooting evaded capture. In light of the failure to implement the taxation without provoking a violent response, the British abandoned the policy altogether.

=== 1945 Sheikh Bashir Rebellion ===
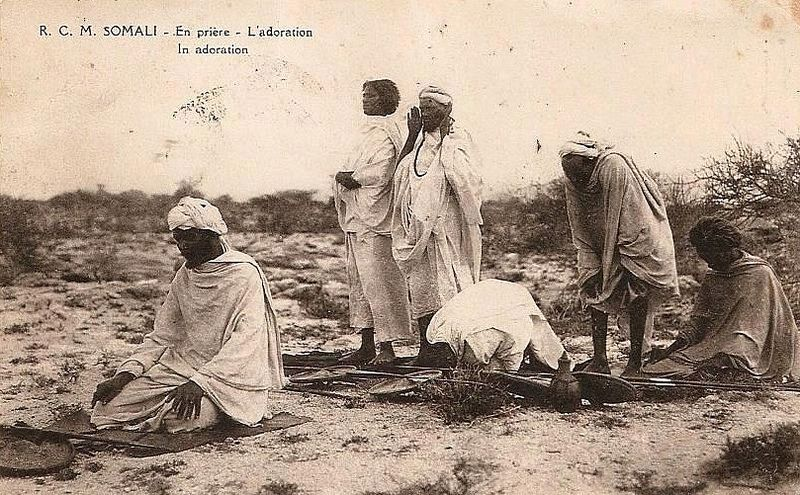
Sheikh Bashir praying Sunnah prayer, 1920

The 1945 Sheikh Bashir Rebellion was a rebellion waged by tribesmen of the Habr Je'lo clan in the former British Somaliland protectorate against British authorities in July 1945 led by Sheikh Bashir, a Somali religious leader.

On 2 July, Sheikh Bashir collected 25 of his followers in the town of Wadamago and transported them on a lorry to the vicinity of Burao, where he distributed arms to half of his followers. On the evening of 3 July, the group entered Burao and opened fire on the police guard of the central prison in the city, which was filled with prisoners arrested for previous demonstrations. The group also attacked the house of the district commissioner of Burao District, Major Chambers, resulting in the death of Major Chamber's police guard before escaping to Bur Dhab, a strategic mountain south-east of Burao, where Sheikh Bashir's small unit occupied a fort and took up a defensive position in anticipation of a British counterattack.

The British campaign against Sheikh Bashir's troops proved abortive after several defeats as his forces kept moving from place to place and avoiding any permanent location. No sooner had the expedition left the area, than the news traveled fast among the Somali nomads across the plain. The war had exposed the British administration to humiliation. The government came to a conclusion that another expedition against him would be useless; that they must build a railway, make roads and effectively occupy the whole of the protectorate, or else abandon the interior completely. The latter course was decided upon, and during the first months of 1945, the advance posts were withdrawn and the British administration confined to the coast town of Berbera.

Sheikh Bashir settled many disputes among the tribes in the vicinity, which kept them from raiding each other. He was generally thought to settle disputes through the use of Islamic Sharia and gathered around him a strong following.

The British administration recruited Indian and South African troops, led by police general James David, to fight against Sheikh Bashir and had intelligence plans to capture him alive. The British authorities mobilized a police force, and eventually on 7 July found Sheikh Bashir and his unit in defensive positions behind their fortifications in the mountains of Bur Dhab. After clashes Sheikh Bashir and his second-in-command, Alin Yusuf Ali, nicknamed Qaybdiid, were killed. A third rebel was wounded and was captured along with two other rebels. The rest fled the fortifications and dispersed. On the British side the police general leading the British troops as well as a number of Indian and South African troops perished in the clashes, and a policeman was injured.

After his death, Sheikh Bashir was widely hailed by locals as a martyr and was held in great reverence. His family took quick action to remove his body from the place of his death at Geela-eeg mountain, about 20 miles from Burao. A secondary school in Burao, called the Sheikh Bashir Secondary School, is named in his honour.

=== Post-colonial ===
The town became a district capital and a number of public buildings were subsequently established in the following years. Burao's administrative importance declined after Hargeisa replaced Berbera as the capital of the British Somaliland protectorate in 1941, and Burao's urban infrastructure remained underdeveloped. However, with the expansion of the region's livestock trade in the 1950s the city once again began to grow. Serving as the most important regional market hub, where livestock from the Hawd region as well as the city's south-western hinterlands was assembled and exported to Saudi Arabia, Burao grew rapidly and replaced Berbera as the second largest city of the Protectorate.

Burao's rapid growth continued after independence in 1960. Burao regained its administrative importance as it was made the capital of the Togdheer region, which at the time encompassed today's Togdheer, Sool and Sanaag regions. Burao was also during this time the third largest city of Somalia after Mogadishu and Hargeisa.

With the opening of a local branch of the Somali Commercial Bank, livestock traders gained access to credits and further expanded their business activities by investing their profits in the real estate market, further contributing to the development and growth of the city. Burao was reorganized and restructured massively during the 1970s, and with the migration of locals to the Gulf states, where the oil boom had opened up new job opportunities, Burao's vibrant land market was stimulated further as their savings were often invested in real estate. The city's growth was also caused by the development of its shoe industry and educational facilities.

=== Somaliland War of Independence ===
After Siad Barre took power in 1969, the Isaaq sub-clans felt more and more marginalized, as outsiders from the Darood clan dominated the political establishment of Burao. Most governors during Barre's time in office came from the South and belonged to Darood clans. Violent incidents against the Isaaq civilian population increased in the 1980s, which led to Isaaqs supporting the rebellion of the Somali National Movement.

In May 1988, the Somali National Movement launched an offensive on the cities of Hargeisa and Burao, then the second and third largest cities of Somalia. The SNM captured Burao on 27 May within two hours, while the SNM entered Hargeisa on 29 May, overrunning most of the city apart from its airport by 1 June. During the offensive the Somali National Army committed gross human rights violations, including attacking the civilian population using heavy artillery and tanks. Almost immediately SNM fighters took over the military compound at Burao airport where the majority of Somali army soldiers were stationed, the military compound at Goon Ad (Somali: Goon Cad) in the outskirts of the city, as well as two police stations (including the central police station of Burao), Burao prison and a variety of government offices in the city. The SNM executed a number of Somali military officers and officials. After capturing Burao's central prison the SNM freed political prisoners (including schoolchildren). Somali troops subsequently retreated to their base in Goon Ad.

After Somali troops retreated to Goon Ad, in the late afternoon, off-duty soldiers regrouped and entered the center of the city. According to reports by Human Rights Watch's Africa Watch, the soldiers, upon entering the city, went on a rampage on 27 and 28 May. This included "dragging men out of their houses and shooting them at point blank range" and summary killing of civilians, the report also noted that "civilians of all ages who had gathered in the centre of town, or those standing outside their homes watching the events were killed on the spot. Among the victims were many students." There was also widespread looting by the soldiers, and some people were reportedly killed as a result.

Following the first two days of the conflict, angered by the extent to which Isaaqs welcomed the SNM incursion, and frustrated by their inability to contain the SNM advance, the military started attacking the civilian population without restraint "as if it was the enemy". The military used "heavy artillery and tanks, causing severe damage, both to civilians and to property. Bazookas, machine guns, hand grenades and other weapons of mass destruction were also directed against civilian targets in Hargeisa which had also been attacked as well as in Burao."

A United States Congressional General Accounting Office team reported the Somali government's response to the SNM attack as follows:

The Somali army reportedly responded to the SNM attacks in May 1988 with extreme force, inflicting heavy civilian casualties and damages to Hargeisa and Burao....The Somali military resorted to using artillery and aerial shelling in heavily populated urban centres in its effort to retake Burao and Hargeisa. A majority of the refugees we interviewed stated that their homes were destroyed by shelling despite the absence of SNM combatants from their neighbourhoods....The refugees told similar stories of bombings, strafings, and artillery shelling in both cities and, in Burao, the use of armored tanks. The majority saw their houses either damaged or destroyed by the shelling. Many reported seeing members of their families killed in the barrage....

Refugee interviews conducted by Africa Watch described how the government separated the non-Isaaqs from the Isaaqs before the attack was initiated:

As soon as the fighting broke out, the government used loudspeakers to sort the civilians out into Darood and Isaak. They would shout, "Who is from Galkayo? Mogadishu? Las Anod? Garoe?" [Non-Isaaq territory]. They appealed to the non-Isaaks to leave so they could burn the town and all those who remained behind. Most of the people from these towns left; the government provided them with transportation.

==== Aerial bombardment and destruction of Burao ====
Somali Air Force aircraft started intense aerial bombardment of Burao on Tuesday 31 May. Burao, then the third largest city in Somalia was "razed to the ground", and most of its inhabitants fled the country to seek refuge in Ethiopia. Foreign aid workers who fled the fighting confirmed that Burao was "emptied out" as a result of the government's campaign.

=== Declaration of Independence ===
In May 1991, an SNM Central Committee convened in Burao collectively agreed upon revoking its voluntary union with the Somali Democratic Republic. Representatives from the Isaaq clan were in collective support of secession which was reinforced by the support the clan elders of the non-Isaaq clans who were present at the Burco conference Following extensive consultations between SNM leadership figures and clan representatives, it was agreed that Northern Somalia (formerly State of Somaliland) would revoke its voluntary union with the rest of Somalia to form the "Republic of Somaliland". The conference was concluded with formation of an interim administration whereby Abdirahman Ahmed Ali Tuur was elected to govern for a period of two years.

== Demographics ==
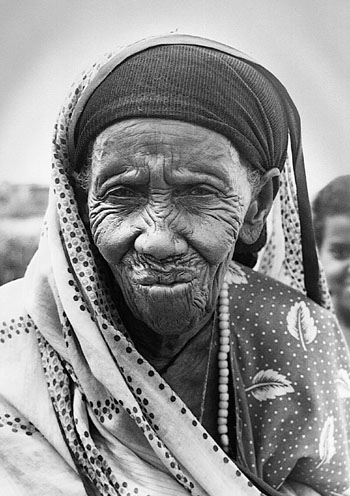
An elderly woman from Burao, after the city had been severely damaged during the Somali civil war, 1991

Burao's population has grown rapidly since its establishment. In 1962, Somalia's statistical service estimated Burao's population to be 12,600. This rose to 20,000 in 1994, 180,211 in 2005, and 230,000 in 2015. As of 2023, Burao has a population of 750,000.

The main residents of Burao are the Habr Je'lo, Habr Yonis, Isamusa and the Arap, which are all subdivisions of the larger Isaaq Somali clan-family.

Burao is divided into four wards; Mohamed Ali, Farah Omar, Lihle and Sheikh Bashir. These wards are further divided into neighbourhoods.

== Economy ==
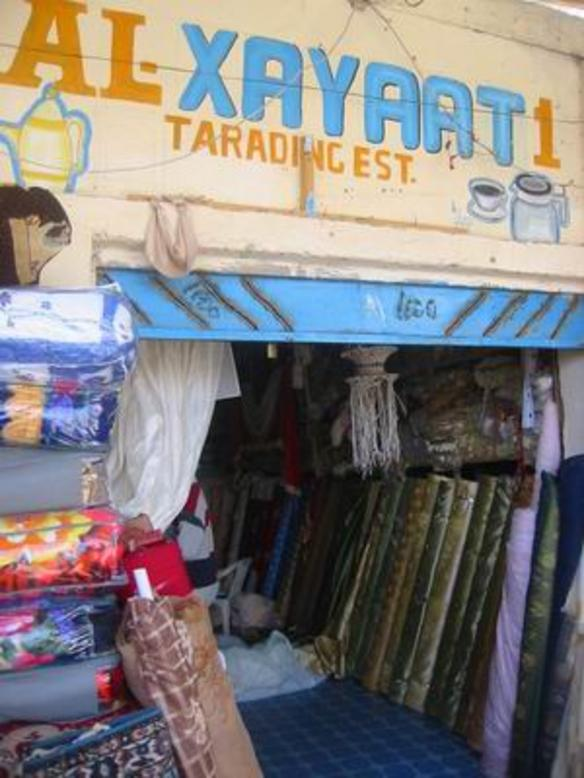
A fabric and carpet boutique in Burao's old section

The city's economy is primarily based on the export of livestock, with Burao and the nearby town of Yiroowe being home to two of the largest livestock markets, known in Somali as seylado in the Horn of Africa, with as many as 10,000 heads of sheep and goats sold daily in the city. Burao's livestock market is also the most important livestock market in Somaliland as well as Somalia.

The city's central location serves as a hub that connects the nomadic interior of Somaliland and major cities like Erigavo, Aynaba and Las Anod to Somaliland's capital Hargeisa and its main port in Berbera. The central location of Burao has contributed to its economic revival. Goods travelling to the south, central and eastern parts of Somaliland all depart from the city's outskirts. Rural merchants also sell their produce on a daily basis, which attracts business. This along with the main livestock market of the city fuels Burao's economy.

In 2007, Burao's city authority (in conjunction with development organizations and local traders) opened the Burco Meat and Produce complex. One year in the making, the market has two main halls and can accommodate more than 2000 merchants.

== Geography and climate ==
Burao's landscape is semi-desert and fairly flat.

The Togdheer River runs through the town. It is often dry but subject to flooding. The river divides the city in half, and can be crossed via a newly built bridge in the city center.

Weather in Burao, much like other inland towns in Somaliland, is very warm to hot and dry year-round. The city has a hot arid climate (Köppen BWh) in common with most of Somalia, although Burao's weather is moderated by altitude. The average daytime temperatures during the summer months of June and August can rise to 31 °C or 87.8 °F, with a low of 20 °C or 68 °F at night. The weather is cooler the rest of the year, averaging 27 °C or 80.6 °F during the day and 13 °C or 55.4 °F at nighttime. The city's limited rainfall of 222 millimetres or 9 inches usually comes with two peaks during April–May and October–November.

Climate data for Burao
Month	Jan	Feb	Mar	Apr	May	Jun	Jul	Aug	Sep	Oct	Nov	Dec	Year
Mean daily maximum °C (°F)	26.5 (79.7)	28.0 (82.4)	29.7 (85.5)	30.7 (87.3)	31.3 (88.3)	31 (88)	29.4 (84.9)	30.4 (86.7)	31.6 (88.9)	29.8 (85.6)	27.6 (81.7)	26.5 (79.7)	29.4 (84.9)
Mean daily minimum °C (°F)	12.7 (54.9)	13.8 (56.8)	15.6 (60.1)	17.3 (63.1)	18.4 (65.1)	19.4 (66.9)	19.4 (66.9)	19.5 (67.1)	19.4 (66.9)	16.2 (61.2)	14.3 (57.7)	13 (55)	16.6 (61.8)
Average rainfall mm (inches)	2 (0.1)	0 (0)	6 (0.2)	50 (2.0)	59 (2.3)	14 (0.6)	13 (0.5)	13 (0.5)	30 (1.2)	26 (1.0)	9 (0.4)	0 (0)	222 (8.7)
Source 1: Weatherbase
Source 2: Climate Data.ORG

== Wildlife ==
Due to the fertility and greenery of the region, wild animals come to the area either to breed or to graze on the grassland savannah. Prominent animals found locally include the kudu, wild boar, zebra, Somali wild ass, warthog, antelope, the Somali sheep, wild goat, camel, and many different types of birds. Due south of Burao is a grassland savannah, which attracts many types of fauna to the region, including lions and leopards.

== Transportation ==
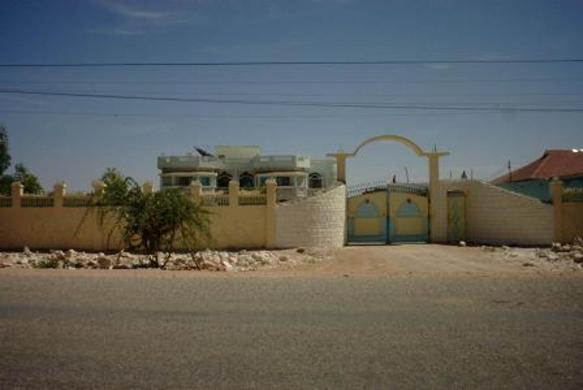
A residential area in Burao

Burao has a working bus system. Air transportation needs are served by the Burao Airport, which offers flights via Daallo Airlines to Hargeisa and other cities in the Horn of Africa, as well as international locations such as Addis Ababa and San'aa. As of 2012, the airport's facilities are undergoing major renovations, supervised by the International Civil Aviation Organization (ICAO).

== Notable residents ==
- Abdirahman Ahmed Ali Tuur – First President of Somaliland
- Ahmed Mohamed Mohamoud (Siilaanyo) – Fourth President of Somaliland
- Hadraawi – renowned Somali poet
- Hurre Walanwal — Somali poet and songwriter
- Sheikh Ali Warsame (1939–2022), prominent Somali Islamic cleric and preacher
- Abdi Awad Ali (Indha Deero) – renowned Somali entrepreneur and business tycoon
- Sooraan – renowned Somali poet and comedian
- Ubah Ali – anti-FGM activist
- Muhammad Haji Ibrahim Egal – Second President of Somaliland
- Saad Ali Shire – incumbent Minister of Finance of Somaliland
- Mohamed Dhoodhe (author). Somali writer

== See also ==
- Togdheer
