= Togdheer =

Region of Somaliland

Togdheer Togdheer (Somali) تُوْجْدَيْر (Arabic)
- Regions of Somaliland
- Location in Somaliland
- Country: Somaliland
- Administrative centre: Burao

Government
  - Governor: Mahamed Abdillahi Ibrahim

Area
  - Total: 30,426 km^{2} (11,748 sq mi)

Population (2019)
  - Total: 962,400 (estimate)
  - Density: 31.63/km^{2} (81.92/sq mi)
- Time zone: UTC+3 (EAT)
- HDI (2021): 0.323 low · 10th of 18

Togdheer (Somali: Togdheer, Arabic: تُوْجْدَيْر, romanized: Tūjdayr) is an administrative region (gobol) in central Somaliland. Togdheer is bordered by Maroodi Jeex to the west, Saaxil to the north, Sanaag to the northeast, Sool to the east and Ethiopia to the south. Its capital is Burao.

== Overview ==
Togdheer is bordered by Maroodi Jeex from the west, Sahil to the north, Ethiopia to the south, and Sanaag & Sool to the east. With its capital at Burao (Burco), the region's name is derived from the Togdheer River, which means "Long River" in Somali. The region has an approximate population of 350,000 people.

Under British Somaliland, the Togdheer region was formerly the Burao district which was one of three districts that comprised the Burao region. The other two regions were Las Anod and Erigavo districts. Sanaag was carved out of Togdheer region and was established as a separate region on June 23, 1973, comprising the three districts of Erigavo, Las Qorey and Garadag.

As with much of Somaliland, most local residents in the Togdheer region are nomadic pastoralists.

== Districts ==
The Togdheer region consists of the following three districts:

District	Grade	Capital	Comments	Location
Burao	A	Burao	Regional capital	
Oodweyne	B	Oodweyne		
Buhoodle	B	Buhoodle		

Cities, towns, and villages in Togdheer

== Demographics ==
It is primarily inhabited by the Habr Je'lo, Habr Yonis, Isamusa and Arap, all of which are subdivisions of the larger Isaaq clan-family.

The Dhulbahante of the Harti Darod clan is also present in the Buuhoodle district.

== Major towns ==
- Burao
- Oodweyne
- Buuhoodle
- Balidhiig
- Qoryale
- Yirowe
- fiqi ayuub

== Map ==
Map of Togdheer region

== See also ==
- Ogo Mountains
- Hahi
