= List of assassinated people in Somalia =

The following is a partial, chronological list of assassinated people from Somalia mainly killed on political and religious grounds. Many were critical public servants and intellectuals assassinated by Al-Shabaab militants. Many described Al-Shabab as Kharijite, a term commonly used in Islamic discourse to describe groups or individuals perceived as overly rigid, extremist, or quick to excommunicate others.

== 1865–1990 ==
- 2 October 1865: Karl Klaus von der Decken, a German explorer and three others in his party were murdered by local Somalis after his ship the Welf foundered in rapids beyond Bardera.
- 15 October 1969: Abdirashid Ali Sharmarke, Prime Minister of Somali Republic from 12 July 1960, to 14 June 1964, and President of Somali Republic from 6 July 1967, was assassinated while visiting Las Anod the administrative capital of Sool region.
- 9 July 1989: Salvatore Colombo was an Italian Catholic prelate who served as Bishop of Mogadiscio from 1976 until his assassination in Mogadishu.

== 1990s ==
- 5 January 1991: Haji Muse Boqor was founding members of Somali parliament and first Somali Minister of Interior, Boqor was assassinated in Mogadishu.
- 2 January 1993: Sean Devereux, a British Salesian missionary and aid worker was assassinated in Kismayo while working for UNICEF. He was assigned to organise relief in Kismayo, the stronghold of a Somali warlord. After four months in the country, he was shot in the back of the head by a lone hired gunman.
- 12 July 1993: Dan Eldon was a British-Kenyan photojournalist, artist and activist killed in Somalia while working as a Reuters photojournalist.
- 9 March 1996: Elman Ali Ahmed was a Somali entrepreneur and social activist. He was assassinated by an unknown killer.

== 2000s ==
- 22 October 2003: Richard "Dick" Eyeington and Enid Eyeington (née Pratt) were a British couple who worked as aid workers in Somaliland until their assassination in Borama.
- 28 July 2006: Abdallah Isaaq Deerow left Friday prayers in Baidoa, at the time the temporary seat of the TFG. A lone gunman assassinated him. In response, authorities began a security crackdown.
- 01 May 2008: Aden Hashi Farah Ayro was a militant leader. He and other important leaders of the al-Shabaab, including Sheikh Muhyadin Omar, were killed by a U.S. airstrike on his house in the town of Dhusamareb.

=== Hotel Shamo bombing ===
- 3 December 2009: Federal ministers, students, professors and journalists attended a graduation ceremony at Shamo Hotel in Mogadishu for medical students from Benadir University. A suicide bomber from Al-Shabaab detonated in the audience. Ibrahim Hassan Adow, Qamar Aden Ali, Ahmed Abdulahi Waayeel, Saleban Olad Roble, and 21 students and journalist were killed, and more than 60 were wounded.

== 2010s ==
- 24 August 2010: Idiris Muse Elmi, member of the Transitional Federal Parliament of Somalia, was killed by an al-Shabaab suicide bomber in Mogadishu.
- 20 November 2019: Almaas Elman, a Somali-Canadian humanitarian aid worker and the eldest daughter of Elman Ali Ahmed was murdered.
