= Saleban Olad Roble =

Somali politician

Minister of Sport
- In office ? – February 10, 2010 (his death)
- President: Sharif Sheikh Ahmed
- Prime Minister: Omar Sharmarke

Personal details
- Born: February 23, 1963 Somalia
- Died: February 12, 2010 (aged 46) King Fahd Medical City, Riyadh, Saudi Arabia
- Cause of death: Suicide bombing (victim)

Saleban Olad Roble (February 23, 1963 - February 12, 2010) was a Somali politician and a minister in the Transitional Federal Government.

He was critically wounded in a suicide bombing at the Hotel Shamo in Mogadishu, the capital of Somalia, on 3 December 2009. Minister of Health Qamar Aden Ali, Minister of Education Ahmed Abdulahi Waayeel and Minister of Higher Education Ibrahim Hassan Addow were killed in the blast. At the time, Roble was serving as Minister of Sport. Roble died on February 12, 2010, at a hospital in the Saudi capital Riyadh, after he and other victims of the blast had been flown there for treatment.
