= Lists of assassinations =

Lists of assassinations contain links to sets of articles on assassinations.

== Main lists ==
- List of assassinations contains successful assassinations of prominent figures, sorted by location.
- List of heads of state and government who survived assassination attempts contains failed assassinations against government officials.
- List of people who survived assassination attempts contains failed assassinations against people who were not government officials.

== By target ==
- List of assassinated American politicians
- Lists of assassinated anticolonialist leaders
- List of assassinated Brazilian politicians
- List of British MPs killed in office
- Assassinated Catholic priests in Guatemala
- List of assassinated human rights activists
- List of assassination attempts on prime ministers of India
- List of assassinated Indian politicians
- List of assassinations of the Kurdish Workers' Party insurgency
- List of assassinated serving ambassadors
- List of members of the United States Congress killed or wounded in office
- List of United States presidential assassination attempts and plots

== By perpetrator ==
- List of assassinations by the Assassins
- List of Iranian assassinations
- List of Israeli assassinations
- List of people assassinated by the Janatha Vimukthi Peramuna
- List of people assassinated by the Liberation Tigers of Tamil Eelam
- List of people assassinated by the People's Mojahedin of Iran
- List of Red Army Faction (Baader-Meinhof) assassinations
- List of Russian assassinations
- List of Soviet assassinations
- List of assassinations by the United States

== By location ==
- List of assassinations in Africa
- List of assassinations in Asia
- List of assassinations in Albania
- List of assassinations in Europe
- List of assassinations in Lebanon
- List of assassinations in the Philippines
- List of assassinated people in Somalia
- List of assassinated people from Turkey

== By event ==
- List of politicians killed during the 2024 Mexican elections
- List of Apartheid South African assassinations
- List of politicians killed during the presidency of Claudia Sheinbaum
- List of assassinations during the Iraqi conflict
- List of Second Chechen War assassinations
- List of assassinations of the Second JVP Insurrection
- List of assassinations of the Sri Lankan civil war
- List of Turkish diplomats assassinated by Armenian militant organisations

== By method ==
- List of deaths by car bombing
- List of assassinations by firearm

== See also ==
- List of heads of state and government who were assassinated or executed
- Lists of murders
- List of regicides
- List of terrorist incidents
- Lists of unsolved murders
