= Laaleys =

- Village
- Location within Sahil, Somaliland Location within Somaliland
- Coordinates: 10°05′37″N 45°09′58″E
- Country: Somaliland
- Region: Sahil
- District: Berbera District

Population (2002)
  - Total: 500
- Time zone: UTC+3 (EAT)

Laaleys (Laalays) is a village in south-central Sahil region in Somaliland. It is on the route from Berbera to Sheikh, 46km before the climb into the Golis mountains.

== History ==
Laaleys appears in a book published in 1951 in England under the name "Lalis".

In August 2021, the Government of Somaliland officially launched a major mineral exploration operation at Hudisa, Laalays and Lasadawo in Sahil region.

In October 2022, the Minister of Agricultural Development of Somaliland visits Laaleys.

== Notable people ==
- Maxamed Yuusuf Cabdi – Somali singer
- Mohamed Sulayman Tubeec – Somali singer-songwriter
