= Kal-Sheikh =

Kal-Sheikh Kal-Sheekh
- Archaeological site
- Country: Somaliland
- Region: Sahil
- District: Sheikh
- Time zone: UTC+3 (EAT)

Kal-Sheikh (Somali: Kal-Sheekh) is an archaeological site in the Sahil region of Somaliland.

== Overview ==
Kal-Sheikh is situated in the Sheikh District. The site features a number of caves adorned with rock art of animals and other figures. As no major archaeological excavation has been conducted here, the Kal-Sheikh paintings are of uncertain origin, purpose and date.

The Kal-Sheikh city and district are inhabited by people from the Deerayahan and Reer Sahal sub-divisions of the Issa Musa sub-clan of the Habar Awal.

== See also ==
- Sheikh, Somaliland
- Somali architecture
