= Abdiqani Sheikh Omar Hassan =

Somali-born Medical Doctor (born 1984)

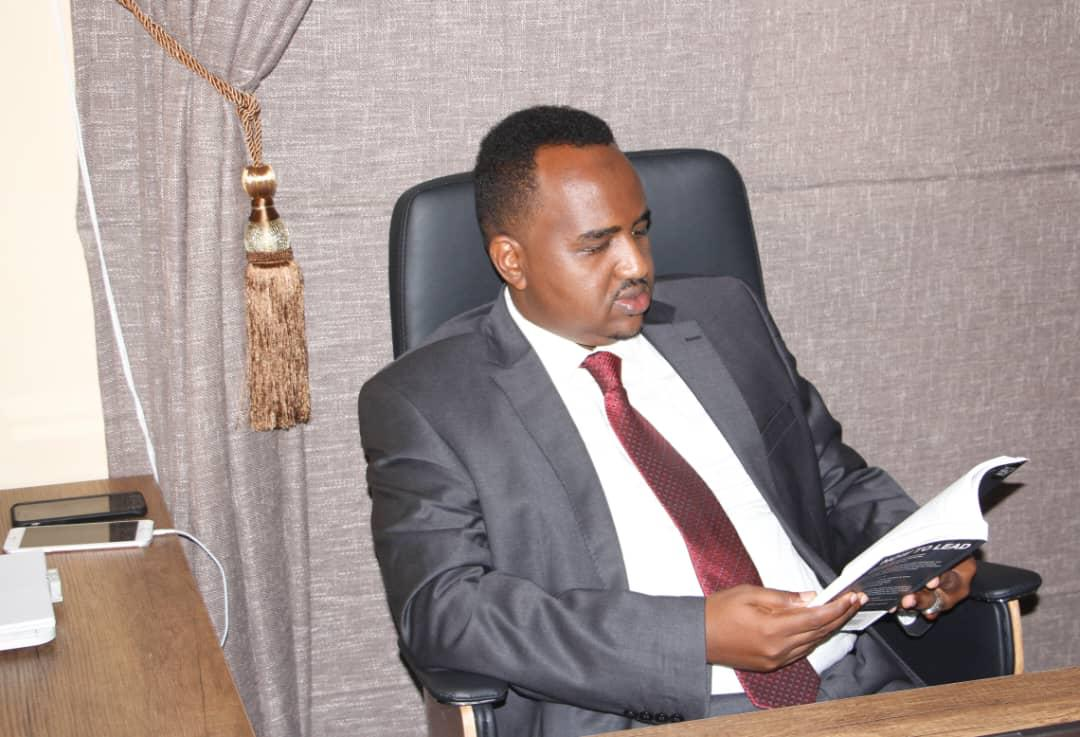
- Abdiqani Sheikh Omar Hassan in his office reading a book
- Born: 1984; Mogadishu, Somalia
- Education: Benadir University (Bachelor's Degree in Medicine and Surgery), Master's Degree in Public Health from the Kampala University
- Occupation: Medical Doctor
- Years active: Since 2017
- Title: Senior WASH Strategic Policy Advisor, Ministry of Energy and Water at Federal Government of Somalia

Abdiqani Sheikh Omar Hassan (born 1984) is a Somali-born Medical Doctor who served as Director-General at the Ministry of Women and Human Rights Development and also at the Ministry of Health and Human Service at Federal Government of Somalia. Since April 2019 to-date Abdiqani has been serving as the Senior WASH Strategic Policy Advisor at the ministry of Energy and Water at the Federal Government of Somalia.

== Background & Education ==
He holds Bachelor's Degree from Benadir University, where he majored in Medicine and Surgery. He also has a master's degree in Public Health from the Kampala University in Uganda. His other qualifications are Master of Business Administration from the United States International University Africa, Master of International Cooperation and Humanitarian Aid at the KALU Institute, Diploma in Human resource management from Dima College in Kenya, and a post-graduate diploma in Malaria Program Planning and Management from the University of Tehran.

== Career ==
Dr. Abdiqani has been serving in the medical and public health industry for 13 years. He first started off as an Assistant Coordinator in the National Refugee Commission back in 2007 in Somalia.

In his professional career he has worked as an executive director at the Somali Young Doctors Association, a Research Fellow at the Somali Medical Research Institute, a National Malaria Director at the Ministry of Health, and offered consultancy services as a technical advisor and survey coordinator for the Malaria Program in Somalia.

In the year 2014 Abdiqani got appointed as a Director-General in the Ministry of Health and Human Service in Somalia.

Later in 2016, Dr. Abdiqani's shifted to working for women and Human rights. As a Director-General in the Ministry of Women and Human Rights, he supervised a team to develop the Human Resource Manual, Financial Management Manual, Human Resource Mapping, Gender Mainstreaming, and Human Right Commission Road Map and also introduced the culture of local and international training to enhance the staff capacity-building process. He also came up with and presented the Sexual Offense Bill to the Somalia cabinet ministers.

As a champion of Women's rights, Abdiqani adopted the National Gender Policy and Female Genital Mutilation Policy which he presented to the cabinet ministers for approval. He also managed to get the Human Rights Commission Bill signed by the President of Somalia.

Abdiqani featured as one of the keynote speakers at The 8th biannual FOKO Conference and network meeting in 2016 where the topic was Female Genital Mutilation – a matter of human rights and gender equality.

== See also ==
- Federal Government of Somalia
