= Abdinur Sheikh Mohamed =

Somali educator and politician

- عبد النور الشيخ محمد
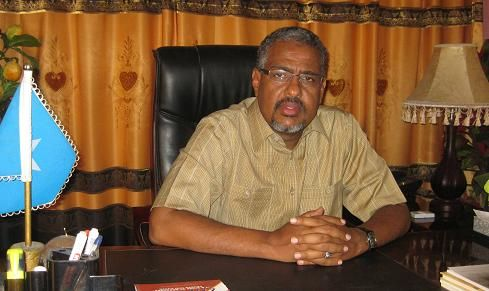

Minister of Education, Higher Education and Culture of Somalia
- In office 12 November 2010 – 19 June 2011
- Prime Minister: Mohamed Abdullahi Mohamed
- Preceded by: Ahmed Abdulahi Waayeel (Minister of Education); Ibrahim Hassan Adow (Minister of Higher Education)
- Succeeded by: Ahmed Aidid Ibrahim

Personal details
- Born: Somalia
- Education: Ohio State University (PhD)

Abdinur Sheikh Mohamed (Somali: Cabdinuur Sheekh Maxamed; Arabic: عبد النور الشيخ محمد) is a Somali educator and politician. He holds a Ph.D. in educational administration from the Ohio State University. Mohamed worked for a number of years with the Ohio Department of Education. From 2010 to 2011, he served as Minister of Education, Higher Education and Culture of Somalia under Prime Minister Mohamed Abdullahi Mohamed (Farmajo) in the Transitional Federal Government. Mohamed currently is an educational consultant and Title III state coordinator with the Lau Resource Center for English as a Second Language, Bilingual and Multicultural Education at the Ohio Department of Education. He is also an adjunct professor at Otterbein University in Westerville.
