= Qamar Aden Ali =

Somali lawyer and politician

Qamar Aden Ali قمر آدم علي

Minister of Health of Somalia
- In office 2007 – December 3, 2009
- Preceded by: Abdi Aziz Sheikh Yusuf
- Succeeded by: Aadan Xaaji Ibraahim Daaud

Personal details
- Born: 19 September 1957 Benadir, Somalia
- Died: 3 December 2009 (aged 52) Mogadishu, Benadir, Somalia
- Resting place: Mogadishu, Benadir, Somalia
- Children: 2 children
- Education: Political science Law
- Occupation: Politician; Lawyer

Qamar Aden Ali (Somali: Qamar Aadan Cali, Arabic: قمر آدم علي) (b. 19 September 1957 – d. 3 December 2009) was a Somali lawyer and politician. She was assassinated whilst serving as the Minister of Health in the Transitional Federal Government of Somalia.

== Biography ==
Qamar was born on 19 September 1957 in a small village outside of Mogadishu, the capital of Somalia. She was the third of 11 children. Qamar spent her childhood in Mogadishu, where she also went to school and graduated from college. She subsequently moved abroad to East Germany to study political science, and later studied law in England. She eventually passed the bar as a lawyer and became a British citizen. In the mid-1990s, Qamar returned to her native Somalia, where she later joined the nation's Transitional Federal Government. From 2007 until her death, she served as the national Minister of Health.

== Assassination ==
On 3 December 2009, Qamar, along with Minister of Education Ahmed Abdulahi Waayeel and Minister of Higher Education Ibrahim Hassan Addow, was killed in a suicide bombing at the Hotel Shamo in Mogadishu. They had been attending a Benadir University graduation ceremony, while the male bomber had passed through security dressed as a woman in an Islamic veil. The bombing was subsequently called a "national disaster" by President Sharif Sheikh Ahmed.

Qamar spoke to her brother, Mohamed Aden Ali, several hours before the attack. She had been attempting to convince him to return to Somalia for the new doctors programme. Following her death, he decided to continue Qamar's plans, saying "The legacy of my sister will go on, we will not stop. Let them know: The people of Somalia, they are ready to die, they are courageous people. We will never stop to give service to our people."

== Legacy ==
There is a school named in her honour and this was to be renovated in 2018 as announced by the Somali Minister Deqa Yasin in November 2018.
