= Annalena Tonelli =

Italian lawyer and social activist

- Born: 2 April 1943; Forlì, Emilia-Romagna, Kingdom of Italy
- Died: 5 October 2003 (aged 60); Borama, Somaliland,
- Cause of death: Assassination by firearm
- Known for: Social Activism
- Awards: Nansen Refugee Award

Annalena Tonelli (2 April 1943 – 5 October 2003) was an Italian Catholic lay missionary and social activist. She worked for 33 years in East Africa, where she focused on tuberculosis and HIV/AIDS prevention and treatment, campaigns for eradication of female genital mutilation, and special schools for hearing-impaired, blind and disabled children. In June 2003, Tonelli was awarded the Nansen Refugee Award, which is given annually by the UNHCR to recognize outstanding service to the cause of refugees. In October 2003, she was killed inside her hospital by two gunmen.

She is the subject of a book, Stronger than Death: How Annalena Tonelli Defied Terror and Tuberculosis in the Horn of Africa, by Rachel Pieh Jones. In February 2020, the Bishop of Forlì-Bertinoro, Livio Corazza, and Bishop of Djibouti, Giorgio Bertin, have jointly initiated the preliminary steps of opening Tonelli's cause for beatification.

== Biography ==
Annalena Tonelli was born in 1943 in Forlì, Italy. She studied Law, becoming a lawyer after graduation.

After "six years of service to poor people of the suburbs, to orphan children, mentally or physically disabled or abused kids" of her own town, in 1969, the then 25-year-old Tonelli went to Africa supported by the Committee Against World Hunger of Forlì, that she had helped to start its activity.

== Kenya ==
=== Wajir ===
In 1969, Tonelli moved to Kenya, where she began working as a teacher at Wajir Secondary School. After some years she studied to be a nurse too and spent over a decade in the town of Wajir caring for the destitute and ill.

Already in 1976, Tonelli became responsible for a World Health Organization (WHO) pilot project for treating tuberculosis in nomadic people. Tonelli invited nomadic tuberculotic patients to camp in front of the Rehabilitation Centre for Disabled she was running with other female volunteers who joined her to serve poliomyelitic, blind, deaf-mute, and disabled people. This approach guaranteed patients' compliance in taking the therapy over the needed six-month treatment, and it was adopted by WHO as DOTS (Directly Observed Therapy Short).

Tonelli also created a deaf school in Wajir whose graduates have gone to other parts of Somali-speaking Africa to start schools. A former pupil from this Wajir deaf school and two deaf women from Wajir established the first schools of Somali Sign Language.

In 1984, following political and inter-clan clashes, the army of Kenya started a repression campaign against the Degodia Somali clan in the Wajir area known as the Wagalla Massacre. The Degodia were suspected of being Shifta or bandits along the roadways. The Kenyan military rounded up 5000 men and boys and brought them to the Wagalla Airstrip and forced them to lie on the stomachs naked for 5 days. Possibly a thousand were shot, tortured or died of exposure. Annalena brought a couple lorries and her Toyota Serf to the Wagalla Airstrip and attempted to collect the bodies and treat the wounded but was refused. Later she followed the tracks of the military vehicles who were dumping the bodies outside the Wagalla Airstrip. Some were not dead and she rescued them. She brought a journalist to photograph the genocide. She smuggled the photos out with Barbara Lefkow, the wife of an American diplomat to put pressure on the international community. The public denunciation by Annalena Tonelli helped to stop the killings but not before thousands died. The Wagalla Massacre is Kenya's worst human rights violation in its history. Arrested and taken in front of a martial court she was told that the fact she escaped two ambushes was not a guarantee to survive a third one. Due to Tonelli's vehement protests over the Kenyan military's use of violence against the Wajir community, the Kenyan authorities refused to extend her work permit. Tonelli subsequently relocated to Somalia.

== Somalia and Somaliland ==
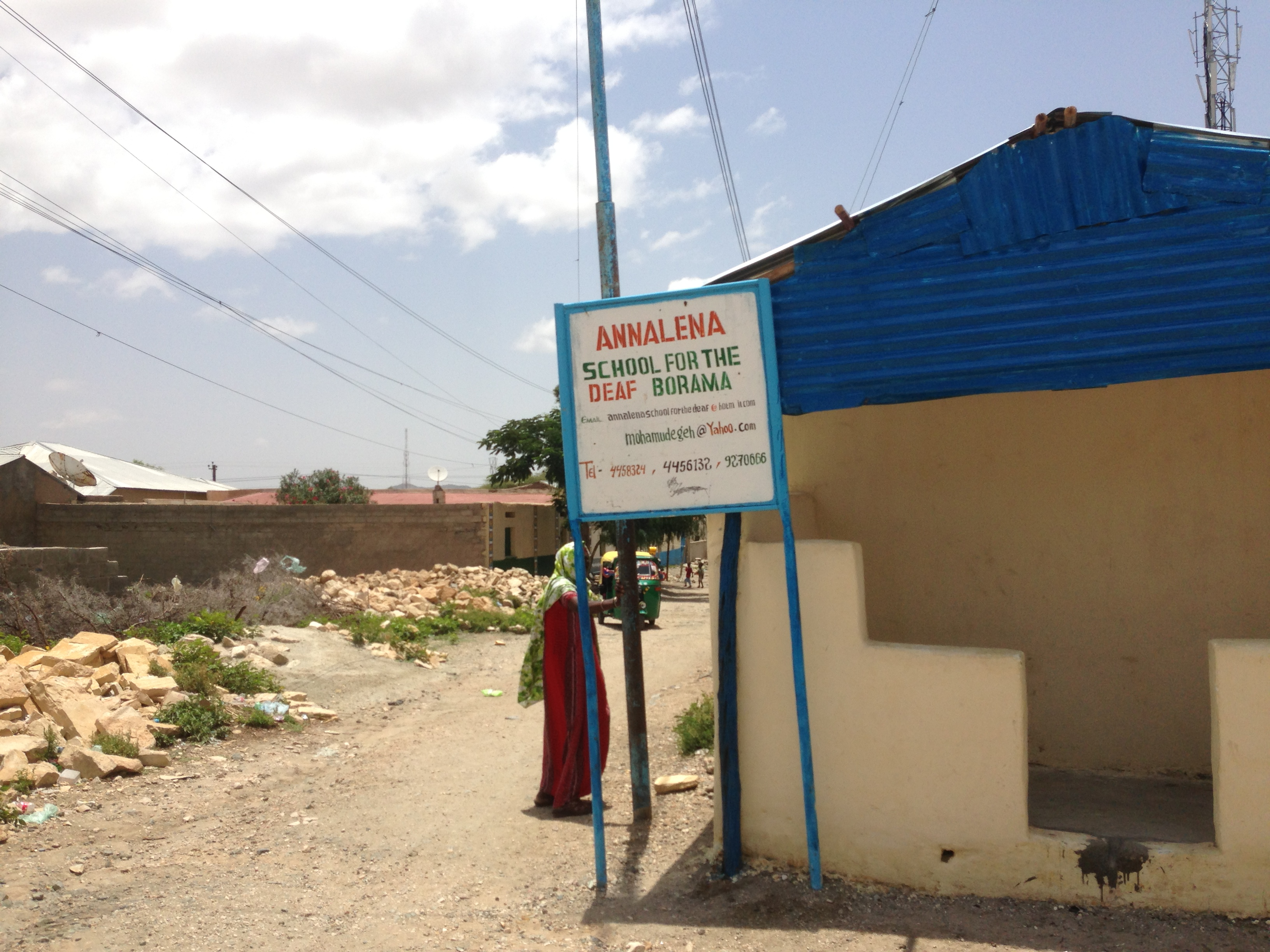
The Annalena Deaf School in Borama, Awdal Somaliland.

Tonelli first settled in the southern port town of Merca, which during the colonial period was part of Italian Somaliland. She later moved to Borama in the northwestern Awdal region, a town in the former British Somaliland protectorate. Tonelli would spend the next 19 years working in Somalia.

In Borama, Tonelli founded a tuberculosis hospital on the grounds of a colonial period facility. Her family and friends in Italy helped finance the hospital, contributing $20,000 a month for maintenance.

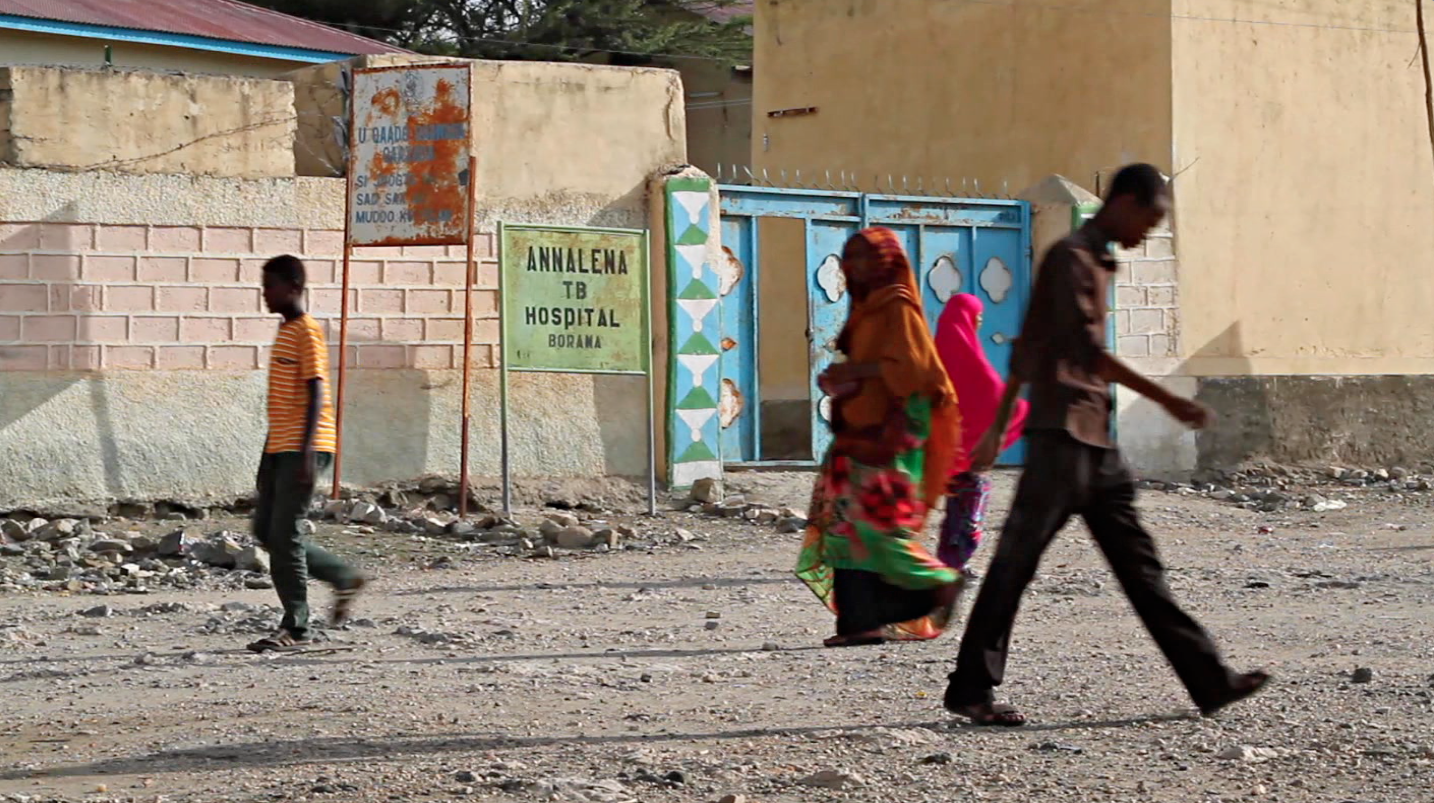
The front entrance to the Annalena TB Hospital in Borama.

== Death ==
In October 2003, Tonelli was assassinated at the tuberculosis hospital she started in Borama by unknown gunmen. There are several rumors about why she was killed. The most plausible is that she was killed by a group who protested her bringing HIV/AIDS patients into Borama. In November 2002, hundreds of protesters marched in front of her Borama hospital throwing stones and shouting "Death to Annalena." They felt she was spreading the disease in their city. Other rumors say she was killed by a disgruntled former worker who felt she owed him a job or that she was killed by men belonging to Al-Itihaad al-Islamiya.

Two weeks after Tonelli's assassination, British aid workers Dick and Enid Eyeington were murdered in their flat at the SOS Sheikh Secondary School in the town of Sheekh, situated in northwestern Somaliland. The assassins possibly belonged to the same terror cell. They were reportedly arrested in 2004, tried and sentenced to death under a local court for the murders of Eyeingtons and another aid worker, Kenyan national Flora Cheruiyot.

== Awards ==
In June 2003, Tonelli was presented the Nansen Refugee Award. The prize is given annually by the United Nations High Commissioner for Refugees to recognize outstanding service to the cause of refugees.
