= Ministry of Human Rights (Somalia) =

Government ministry of Somalia

- Coat of arms of Somalia

Agency overview
- Formed: 2012
- Jurisdiction: Somalia
- Headquarters: Mogadishu
- Agency executive: Hanifa Mohamed Hafsade, Minister of Human Rights
- Parent agency: Cabinet of Somalia

The Ministry of Human Rights is a ministry responsible for monitoring human rights, and in particular women's rights in Somalia. The current Minister of Human Rights is Deeqa Yasin.

== See also ==
- Agriculture in Somalia
