= Wagalla Airstrip =

- IATA: none; ICAO: none

Summary
- Airport type: Public
- Serves: Wagalla
- Location: Wagalla, Kenya
- Coordinates: 01°46′55.92″N 39°56′2.08″E

Map
- Location of airstrip in Kenya

Runways
Direction	Length		Surface
Direction	ft	m	Surface
			Gravel

Wagalla Airstrip is an airstrip in the former North Eastern Province of Kenya. It is situated around 12 kilometers west of Wajir. The airstrip was the site of the Wagalla massacre in February 1984.
