= 2009 Hotel Shamo bombing =

Suicide terror attack in Mogadishu, Somalia

- Location of Somalia in Africa
- Location: 2.0309°N 45.3039°E; Mogadishu, Somalia
- Date: 3 December 2009
- Attack type: Suicide bombing
- Deaths: 25
- Injuries: 60

The 2009 Hotel Shamo bombing occurred at the Hotel Shamo in Mogadishu, Somalia, on 3 December 2009. The suicide bombing killed 25 people, including three ministers of the Transitional Federal Government, and injured 60 more, making it the deadliest attack in Somalia since the Beledweyne bombing on 18 June 2009 that claimed more than 30 lives.

== The bombing ==
The hall had been brightly decorated, and there was a feeling of excitement – such ceremonies rarely happen in Mogadishu.

— Mohammed Olad Hassan, BBC News
Mogadishu in Somalia

The attack took place inside the meeting hall of the Hotel Shamo in Mogadishu during a commencement ceremony for medical students of Benadir University and was carried out by a suicide bomber standing near the front of the stage. The ceremony—the second since Benadir University was formed in 2002 and a rare event in war-torn Somalia—had attracted hundreds of people. In attendance were the graduates and their family members, University officials, and five ministers of the Transitional Federal Government (TFG). Security inside the meeting hall was light and all of the ministers' bodyguards were outside the hall.

=== Casualties ===
Suddenly, the hall shook and I heard a PAW! sound from the front of the ceremony, where most government officials and dignitaries were sitting. I got down on the ground and looked back. Dozens of people were on the ground under a huge cloud of smoke. Others were stampeding to the exit for safety.

— Abdinasir Mohamed, The Wall Street Journal

The bombing killed 24 people and injured 60 others. Most of those killed were students, but also among the dead were two doctors, three journalists, and three government ministers—Minister of Education Ahmed Abdulahi Waayeel, Minister of Health Qamar Aden Ali, and Minister of Higher Education Ibrahim Hassan Addow were killed. Minister of Sports Saleban Olad Roble was critically injured, and was hospitalised. He was later reported to have been flown to Saudi Arabia for treatment, where he died on 13 February 2010.

The three journalists killed in the bombing were: Mohamed Amiin Abdullah of Shabelle Media Network, a Somali television and radio network; freelance photographer Yasir Mairo, who died of injuries in hospital; and a cameraman alternately identified as freelancer Hassan Ahmed Hagi and Al Arabiya cameraman Hassan Zubeyr or Hasan al-Zubair. Their deaths raised to nine the number of journalists killed in Somalia during 2009, including four for Radio Shabelle. The explosion also injured six other journalists, including two—Omar Faruk, a photographer for Reuters, and Universal TV reporter Abdulkadir Omar Abdulle—who were taken to Medina Hospital in critical condition.

The dean of Benadir University's medical college was among the wounded.

== Perpetrator ==
The Danish newspaper Berlingske Tidende reported the bomber was a 24-year-old citizen of Denmark. The Danish intelligence service, the PET, said in a statement that the man was born in Somalia and had been living in Denmark for 20 years. The police chose not to release the name of the suspect, however, a documentary released in 2014 names him as "Abdirahman Mohamed", with one of his friend's giving details regarding his radicalisation. Initially, reports suggested that the bomber had entered the building dressed as a woman in an abaya. During a news conference held in the Hotel Shamo after the attack, President Ahmed called for international assistance to Somalia. He also displayed, according to a local journalist, what he identified as the bomber's body and remains of an explosive belt and a hijab. However, he was later found to have been in a white shirt, standing near the stage, with a camera.

== Aftermath ==
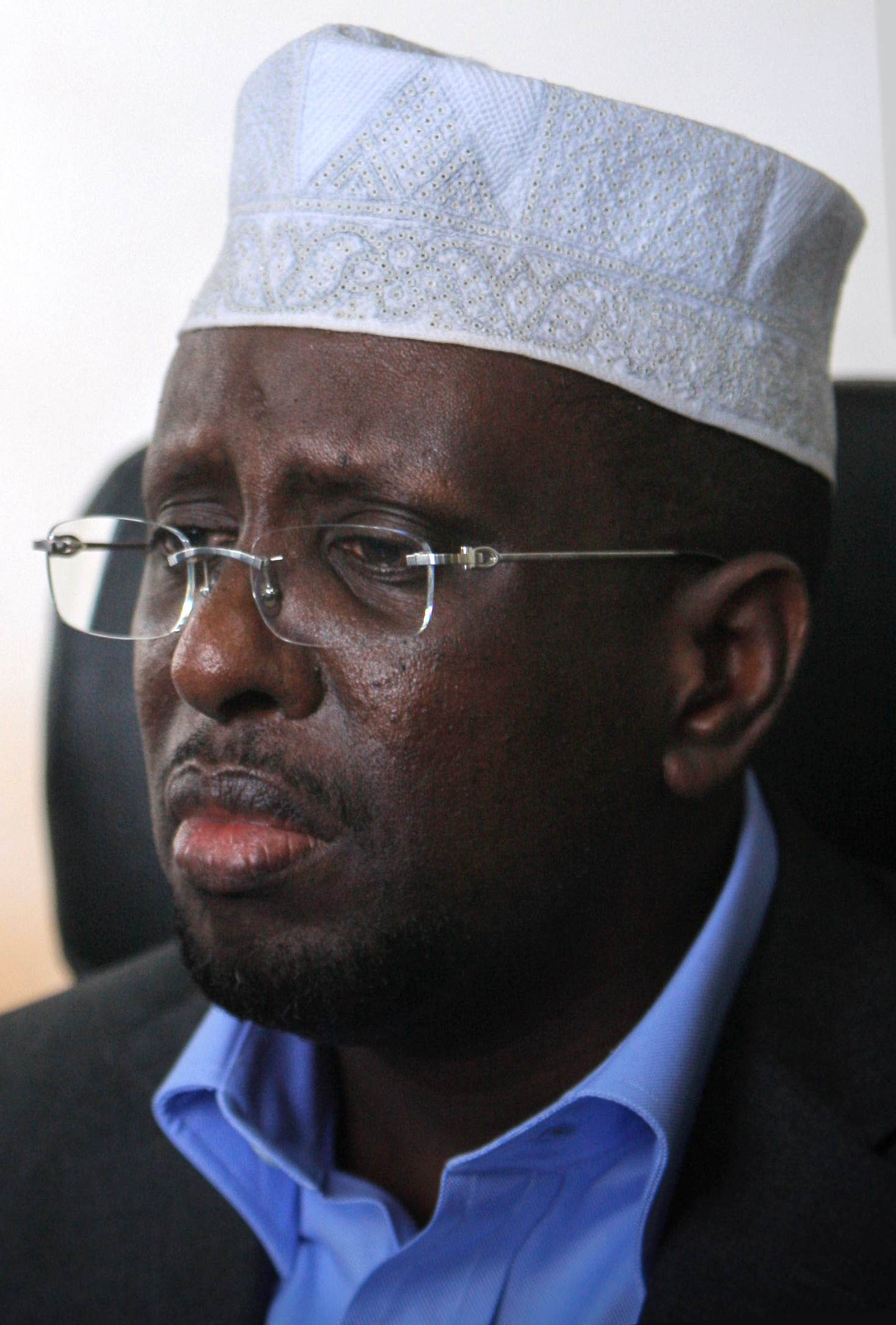
President Sharif Sheikh Ahmed accused the Islamist group al-Shabaab of perpetrating the attack.

No one immediately claimed responsibility for orchestrating the bombing, but Sheikh Sharif Sheikh Ahmed, the President of Somalia, blamed the Somali Islamist group al-Shabaab.

According to Idd Mohamed, a senior Somali diplomat, the attack was carried out to foster "terror" and "panic" and undermine the legitimacy of the Transitional Federal Government. Wafula Wamunyini, the acting head of the African Union Mission to Somalia (AMISOM), expressed a similar opinion, claiming that the attack had the purpose of "intimidat[ing] and blackmail[ing]" the Somali government. Stephanie McCrummen of The Washington Post described the attack as "the worst blow in months" to the United Nations-supported government of Somalia.

=== Reactions ===
The attack drew condemnation from a number of organisations, including the African Union (AU), the European Union, the Arab League, the United Nations Security Council, and the National Union of Somali Journalists.

AMISOM described the bombing as "inhumane and cowardly", and characterised it as a "heinous [crime] against humanity". AMISOM also promised to "spare no efforts" to identify and bring to justice the perpetrators of the attack, and stated that the attack would not deter the AU from continuing to carry out its mission in Somalia.

Baroness Catherine Ashton, the High Representative for Common Foreign and Security Policy for the European Union (EU), echoed AMISOM's sentiment, calling the bombing a "cowardly attack against civilians including students, doctors and journalists".

The UN Security Council president Michel Kafando labelled the attack an act of terrorism and a "criminal act", called for a "thorough investigation", and conveyed "sympathies and condolences" to the victims of the attack, their families, the TFG, and the Somali people.

A joint statement by the UN, the EU, the Arab League and the United States affirmed that the international community would continue its support of the Transitional Federal Government; however, a senior European diplomat indicated that any additional military support to the TFG was unlikely.

President Ahmed characterised the attack as a "national disaster".

The Committee to Protect Journalists issued a statement expressing condolences to the families of the three journalists killed in the bombing and noted that the attack "cemented" Somalia's "position as the deadliest country in Africa for journalists".

== See also ==
- 2009 Beledweyne bombing
- List of journalists killed during the Somali civil war
- List of terrorist incidents, 2009
- Somali Civil War (2009–present)
