= Wagalla massacre =

1984 massacre of ethnic Somalis in Kenya

Wagalla Massacre
- Location: 1°46′56″N 39°56′02″E; Wagalla Airstrip, North Eastern Province, Kenya
- Date: February 10, 1984
- Attack type: Massacre
- Deaths: 57 (per Government of Kenya) up to 5,000 (per eyewitnesses)

The Wagalla massacre was a massacre of ethnic Somalis by the Kenyan Army on 10 February 1984 in Wajir County, Kenya. The massacre started as an effort to neutralize the ethnic Degodia clan following clan-related conflict in the region populated by Kenyan-Somalis. Government troops were ordered to stop clan violence in the area, and did so by first detaining some 5,000 locals at an airstrip, denying them food and water for a week, and then shooting them. The massacre was not investigated by Kenya's government until 2011.

== Overview ==
The massacre took place on 10 February 1984 at the Wagalla Airstrip against the Degoodi clan. It was facilitated by other Somali clans who spied and helped Kenyan troops. The facility is situated approximately 15 km (9 mi) west of the county capital of Wajir in the former North Eastern Province, a region primarily inhabited by the Somalis. Kenyan troops had descended on the area to reportedly help defuse clan-related conflict.

However, according to eye-witness testimony, about 5,000 Somali men of the Degoodi clan were then taken to an airstrip and prevented from accessing water and food for five days before being executed by Kenyan soldiers.

According to a commissioner with The Truth, Justice and Reconciliation Commission of Kenya, a government oversight body that had been formed in response to the 2008 Kenyan post-election violence, the Wagalla massacre represents the worst human rights violation in Kenya's history.

== Death toll ==
The exact number of people killed in the massacre is unknown. However, eyewitnesses place the figure at around 5,000 deaths while the official government death is 57.

== Wagalla Silence ==
Following the massacre, the Kenyan state maintained silence regarding it for decades. They framed the killings as a "security operation" against cattle rustlers. Under President Daniel Moi, official reports denied executions, and journalists, victims, and local leaders who wanted to hold the nation accountable faced mass censorship. This period, from 1982 to 1988 was marked by systematic repression under Moi's Nyayo philosophy of “love, peace, and unity,” which enforced loyalty through torture and propaganda, while suppressing public discussion of state violence. The Wagalla Massacre became one of the many silenced atrocities where the expression of ones opinion was a crime in itself.

Kenya's Truth, Justice, and Reconciliation Commission (TJRC), established in 2008, identified Wagalla as the “worst human rights violation in the nation’s history,” but its final report had to fight against state interference. The TJRC and the International Criminal Court, many argue, failed to deliver justice because of the obstruction by elites, limited participations from locals, and the lack of political will, which left victims without any reparations. The massacre is situated by many within broader structures of historical injustice and land inequality, and it is argued that Kenya's colonial and postcolonial elites help carry on dispossession, marginalization, and regional neglect which made northern communities more vulnerable to violence from Kenyan officials.

Other regional studies highlight how Muslim communities in the Northern Frontier District (NFD) were systematically targeted and excluded from development, which only worsened the sense of betrayal felt by these marginalized groups. Some link this neglect to patterns of radicalization among youth groups in the north, as historical repression like Wagalla created a lack of trust toward state institutions. The state's counterterrorism in northern Kenya is another aspect of the state that reproduces patterns of this punishment among marginalized groups.

President Moi's death in 2020 brought along public debate about his regime's legacy of torture and massacres, such as Wagalla, with survivors describing their ongoing trauma as well as unfulfilled promises of justice. The silence that followed the massacre reflects a reluctance by Kenya to confront atrocities which were committed under the guise of "national unity".

During the massacre, many humanitarian workers attempted to expose the atrocity then and there. Annalena Tonelli, who treated tuberculosis patients in Wajir, spoke out against the killings and suffering of Somali civilians. This led to intense backlash, forcing her to leave the country. This is one example of the experience of many who tried to challenge the state or advocate for marginalized Somalis.

Since the atrocity, we have also seen cultural works to attempt to challenge this silence. Blood on the Runway (2007) is one of the first detailed eyewitness accounts of the killings. Also, filmmaker Judy Kbinge's documents survivor testimonies and the government's role during the massacre in Scarred: The Anatomy of a Massacre (2013). Her work is seen to give a voice to the voiceless and actually change government perception of the event, which demonstrates how art can contribute to transitional justice.

Other political scientists emphasize the process of memorialization, especially through truth commissions, film, and public testimony. These all play a vital role in how societies remember or forget state violence. Kenya's constant hesitation to remember Wagalla reflects the denial common to many states that experienced similar atrocities.

== Aftermath ==
For years the Kenyan government insisted that only 57 people had been killed during "a drive by the security forces against shifta bandits"; it was not until October 2000 that the government publicly acknowledged wrongdoing on the part of its security forces, and increased the number of victims to 380.

After the 2007 elections in Kenya and the associated negotiations between rival factions, a Truth, Justice, and Reconciliation Commission was set up to investigate political violence in Kenya. In 2010, however, Ronald Slye, a law professor from the US, resigned amid concerns that the commission's chairman, Bethual Kiplagat, was biased in favor of the government; those concerns led to international donors withdrawing funding, causing the commission's $16 million budget for 2010 to fall short by $14 million. Moreover, Kiplagat had been connected to the Wagalla massacre both inside and outside Kenya, a connection that Kiplagat, according to Slye, refused to clarify.

In April 2012, Kiplagat was reinstated as TJRC chairman after the Justice Minister Eugene Wamalwa brokered a truce between him and the other commissioners.

The same year, the former Kenyan Prime Minister Raila Odinga ordered an official probe into the atrocities and indicated that the national attorney general should bring to justice those responsible for the killings. Odinga also ordered a museum to be constructed in honour of the victims.

In February 2015, the Wajir County governor Ahmed Abdullahi said his government would partner with local and international human rights organisations in seeking justice for the victims of the massacre, saying that the Truth Commission report offered such an opportunity which remained squandered. "Those mentioned by the TJRC report and witnesses must be prosecuted. The people who afflicted the pain to our people remain unpunished and are still with us," Abdullahi said.

== Film ==
The film/documentary Scarred: The Anatomy of a Massacre, directed by Judy Kibinge, founder of the East African Documentary Film Fund, is the first independent visual attempt to chronicle the history of the massacre as experienced by both the victims and survivors, some of whom were government officials. The documentary was launched at the National Museum in Nairobi in February 2015.

== See also ==
- Garissa massacre
- History of Kenya
- Human rights in Kenya
- Isiolo massacre
- List of massacres in Kenya
- Shifta War
