= Sheikh District =

Sheikh District Degmada Sheekh
- District
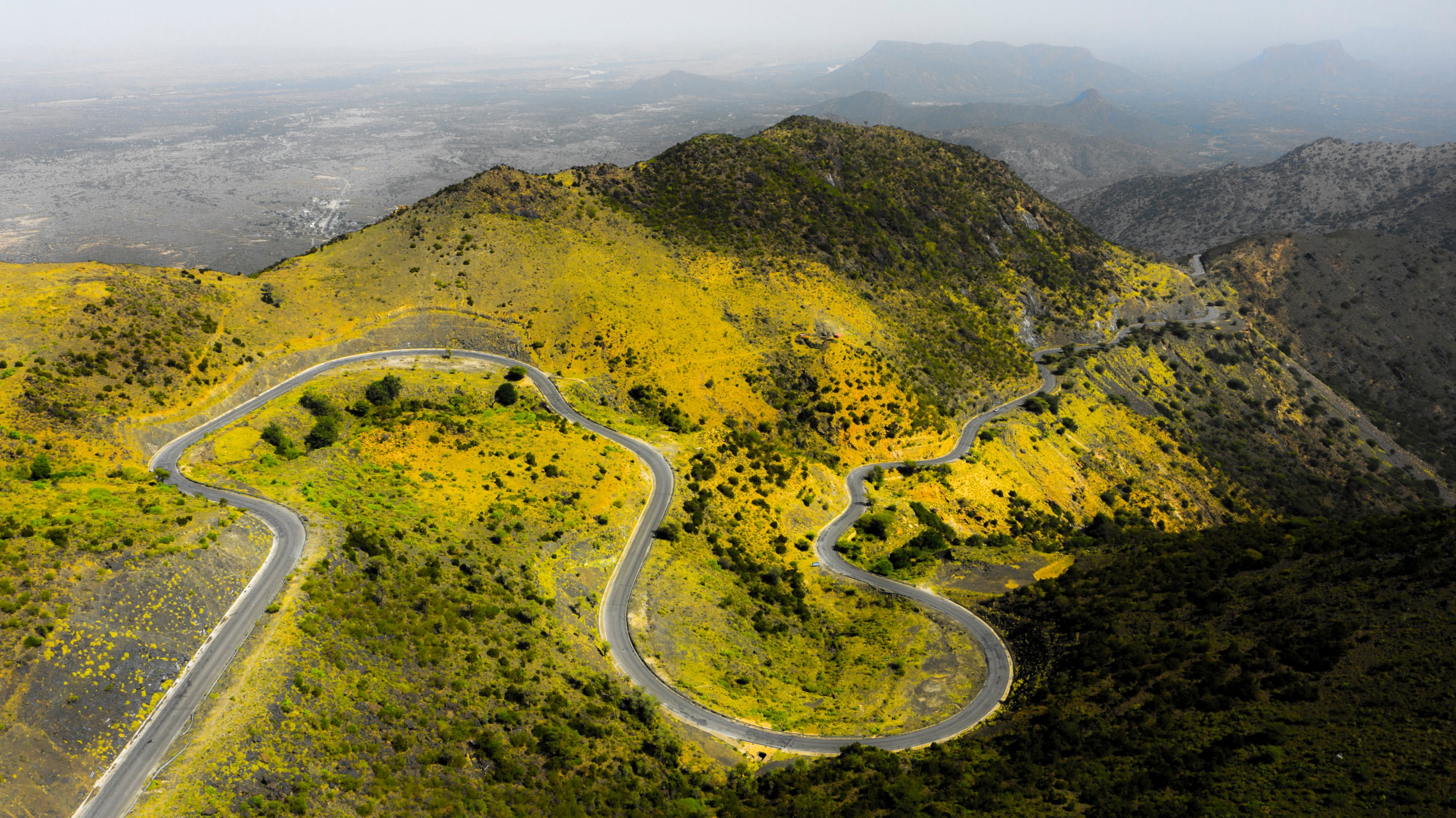

- Location of Berbera district in Sahil, Somaliland
- Country: Somaliland
- Region: Sahil
- Capital: Sheikh
- Elevation: 1,500 m (4,900 ft)

Population (2005)
  - Total: 33,625
- Time zone: UTC+3 (EAT)

Sheikh District (Somali: Degmada Sheekh) is a district in the Sahil region of Somaliland. Its capital lies at Sheikh. The district was part of Togdheer region until 1998, when the Sheikh District was incorporated into the Sahil region.

== Overview ==
Sheikh District is primarily inhabited by people from the Somali ethnic group, with the clan eponyms of Mohamed Isa and Iderias Isa of Isamusa especially well-represented.

== See also ==
- Administrative divisions of Somaliland
- Regions of Somaliland
- Districts of Somaliland
