= Sheikh, Somaliland =

Fardowsa Sheekh شَيخ
- Town
- Sheikh (alqudub)
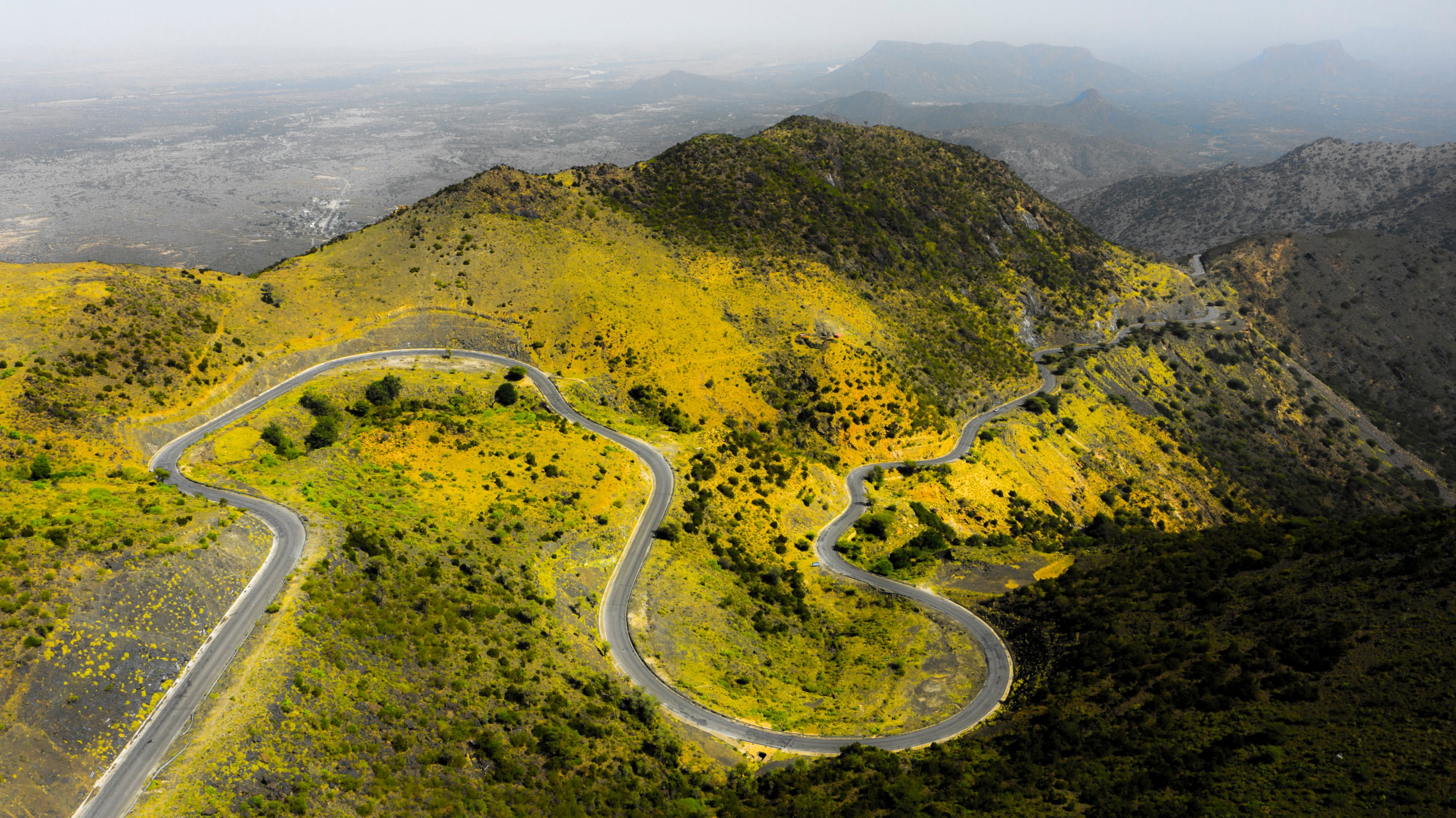
- Nickname: Fardowsa
- Interactive map of Fardowsa
- Coordinates: 9°55′45″N 45°11′30″E
- Country: Somaliland
- Region: Sahil
- District: Sheekh District
- Established: 14th Century

Government
  - Type: Township
  - Mayor: Ismail Hussain ali

Area
  - Total: 14,000 km^{2} (5,400 sq mi)
  - Land: 14,000 km^{2} (5,400 sq mi)

Population (2023)
  - Total: 93,625
  - Density: 14,000/km^{2} (36,000/sq mi)
- Time zone: UTC+3 (EAT)
- Sheikh district: 75000
- Area code: +63

Sheikh (Somali: Sheekh, Arabic: شَيخ,), is a town in central Somaliland. It is associated with one of the largest remains of a medieval settlement in Horn of Africa that formed part of a wider network of inland and coastal trade centres linking the region to Red Sea and Indian Ocean commerce. Sheikh is believed to have been established during the late medieval period, likely between the 13th and 15th centuries, when long-distance trade across the Horn of Africa was at its height.

Sheikh is the capital of the Sheikh district in the region/province Sahil. It lies at an altitude of 1,430 metres (4,690 ft) in the Golis Mountains, roughly halfway between the larger cities of Berbera (on the coast of the Gulf of Aden, at a distance of about 71 km (44 mi)) and Burao (further inland, around 60 km (37 mi) from Sheikh).

In the early 16th century, the settlement experienced a marked decline, likely as a result of disruptions to established trade systems and wider political instability in the region. These changes have been linked to reduced trade with Asia, the expansion of the Portuguese Empire military activity in the Red Sea, and concurrent conflicts within the Horn of Africa. Despite this decline, there is no clear evidence that the settlement was destroyed by violence.

The area remains inhabited today, and Sheikh continues to exist as a small town, preserving both its historical significance and its continuity as a place of settlement.

== Description ==
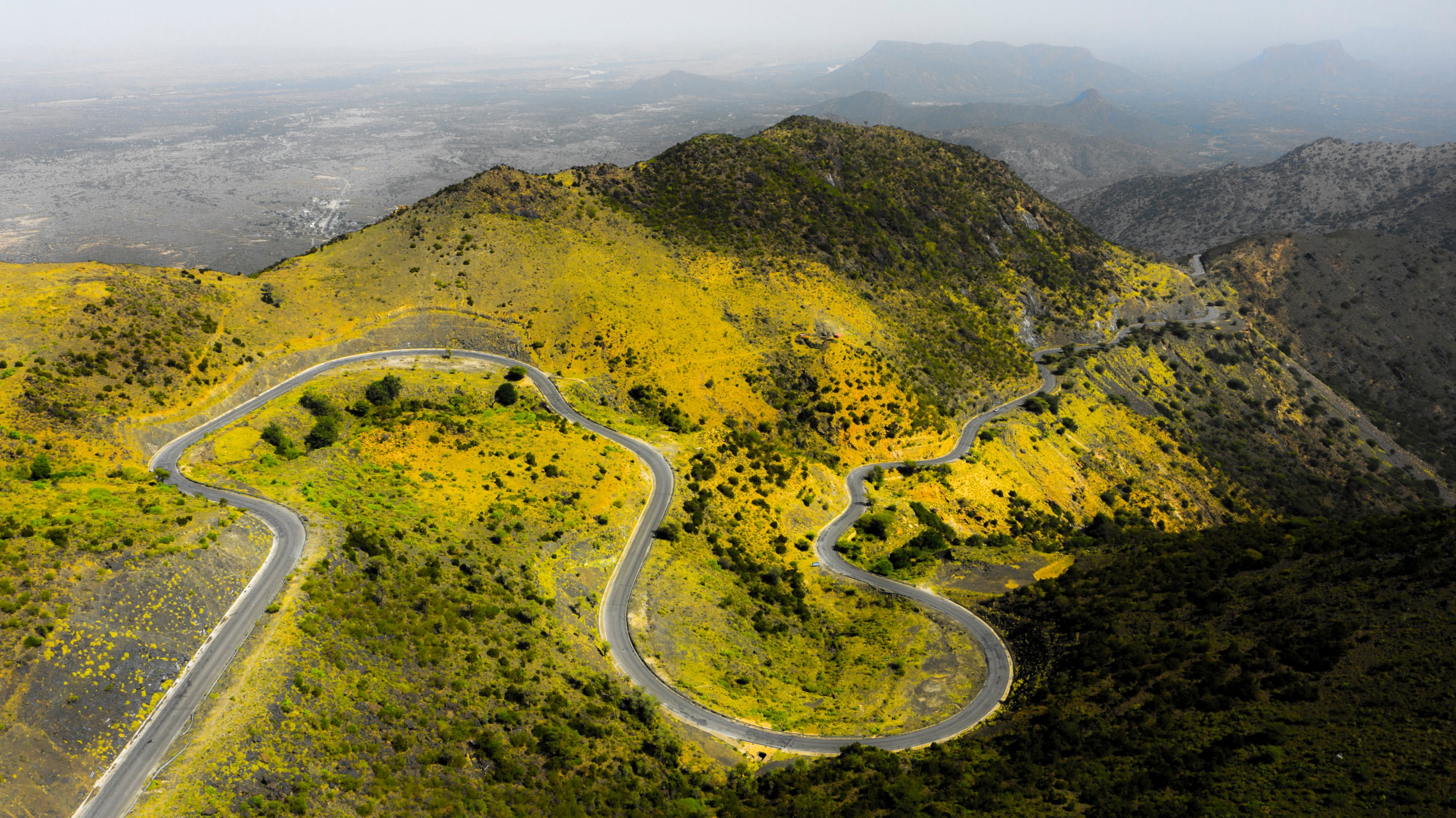
The road to Sheikh through the Golis Mountains.

Sheikh lies on the tarmacked road from Berbera to Burao. This so-called Burao-Berbera Highway is one of the most scenic drives in Somaliland. Coming from hot and arid Berbera the climb into the Golis Mountains starts after some 46 km (29 mi) at the village of Laaleys. The landscape then quickly becomes greener, and, via a series of hairpin bends, the Sheikh pass is reached at about 1,490 m (4,890 ft) above sea level. This is followed by a short descent to Sheikh, which lies on a plateau at about 1,430 m (4,690 ft). Actually, therefore, the Golis Mountains are not a mountain range, but the jagged northern edge of the Somali plateau.

The core of the town has a rectangular street plan. There are four hotels (MashaAllah, Daalo, the Ayaan Muniiro hotel, and the large 5-storey Hashi Baroo hotel). Furthermore, there are at least two pharmacies and several shops and eateries.
Sheikh used to have an airstrip; it has now fallen into disuse but is still recognizable in the landscape.

Several sources indicate that Sheikh is said to contain old British colonial buildings and temple ruins similar to those on the Deccan Plateau in India. These reports appear to be from an article in a Scottish geographic journal from 1898, among others. In practice and on the internet, there is nothing of historical buildings or ruins to be found, and modern guidebooks describe the city as humdrum: mundane, boring.

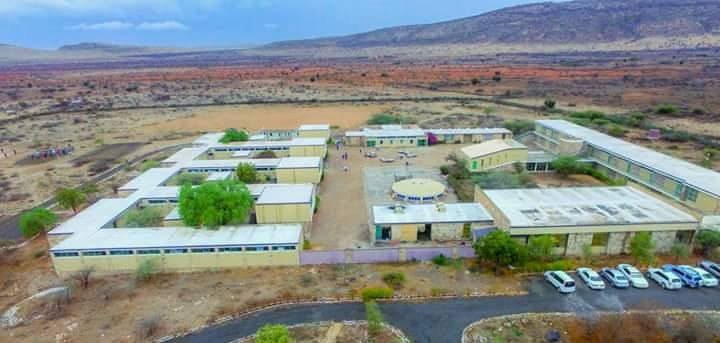
Pharo Secondary School.

Just outside the city is the Pharo Secondary School. It is a large complex founded in 1958 as the "SOS Hermann Gmeiner Sheikh Secondary School" and was run by SOS Children's Villages. In 1989, the school was looted and destroyed by Siad Barre's troops. In 2003, the complex was restored by a British couple and reopened. For this they had to pay with their lives, as a few months after the school's reopening they were murdered by terrorists from Al-Itihaad al-Islamiya because the school allegedly converted pupils to Christianity. Several senior politicians were educated here, including two former Somaliland presidents, Ahmed Silanyo and Ibrahim Egal. The school has strict entry requirements; only the best students are admitted. In 2019, management of the school was taken over by The Pharo Foundation from SOS Children's Villages and the name changed. There are about 260 students (2022).

== History ==
=== Middle Ages and Precolonial ===
Sheikh emerged during a period of significant transformation in the Horn of Africa between the 13th and 16th centuries. This era was marked by the expansion of long-distance trade networks, the spread of Islam into inland regions, and the growing influence of Muslim polities such as the Adal Sultanate. These developments contributed to shifts in settlement patterns, including the establishment of permanent towns in areas previously dominated by nomadic pastoralism.

Located along a strategic route connecting the coastal port of Berbera with the interior of Somaliland and the Haud region, Fardowsa developed as part of a network of settlements that facilitated trade and movement across the region. Its position near a key mountain pass made it an important نقطة for caravan activity and exchange between inland and coastal communities.

Archaeological and material evidence suggests that Fardowsa was actively occupied from at least the late 14th century, with possible earlier phases of settlement. The town appears to have flourished during the 15th century, a period associated with the consolidation of regional trade and the influence of the Adal Sultanate..

In the early 16th century, Fardowsa experienced a gradual decline. This has been linked to wider disruptions affecting the Horn of Africa, including changes in Indian Ocean trade, the arrival and interventions of the Portuguese Empire in the Red Sea, and regional conflicts such as the wars involving the Adal Sultanate and the Ethiopian Empire. Despite these upheavals, there is no clear evidence that the settlement was destroyed violently, and its abandonment appears to have been largely peaceful.

In comparison with other medieval inland settlements in the Adal Sultanate, Fardowsa stands out for the scale and diversity of its material evidence of trade. While most contemporaneous sites in the region have yielded only limited quantities of imported goods—suggesting that long-distance largely passed through rather than directly benefited inland communities—Fardowsa has produced a notably high concentration of foreign materials. These include imported ceramics, glassware, and other objects linked to wider Indian Ocean trade networks. This relative abundance indicates that Fardowsa functioned as a more active of exchange rather than a peripheral point. The contrast with other sites, where local pottery overwhelmingly dominates the archaeological record, highlights Fardowsa’s distinctive role as a hub with stronger and more direct engagement in interregional trade during the medieval period

==== Fardowsa Ruins ====
Sheikh, was a significant trading center in the medieval period, strategically positioned along key trade routes connecting the Somali interior to the Gulf of Aden and the Indian Ocean. The archaeological site of Fardowsa Ruins, provides evidence of the town's economic prominence.

The Fardowsa Ruins contains well-preserved multi-room structures with stone walls over 1.2 meters high, suggesting a developed urban settlement. Excavations have uncovered artifacts such as an Arab coin, glass bangles, and fragments of Chinese porcelain, indicating extensive trade links with the Arabian Peninsula, South Asia, and beyond.

Sheikh's location made it a key node in medieval trade networks, facilitating the exchange of goods between inland markets and coastal ports. The presence of imported commodities underscores its integration into the broader Indian Ocean trade system. Archaeological evidence continues to highlight Sheikh's role as a major commercial hub in the region's history.

A German explorer gave a description over the ruins at Sheikh in the year of 1882.

These ruins extend about 1,000 meters to the north and lean on the east side against a mountain slope that runs south from Dababachel. The area occupied by the ruins is probably about half the size of the present town of Aden Camp. The city may therefore have had 6,000-8,000 inhabitants based on the same ratio, which allows to determine the extent of the necropolis. Very little of the ruins remains, as the buildings, as the buildings have crumbled to the ground, so that only the outlines of individual houses, courtyards, streets, and two large squares remain. The buildings were built of rubble stone, without lime, only with clay, and naturally had to collapse quickly [...] It is possible that further excavation in the ruins could provide more information, as the Somalis have found gold coins here on several occasions, probably [imported] Persian or Turkish, which they exchanged with Arab or Indian merchants at the market in Berbera.

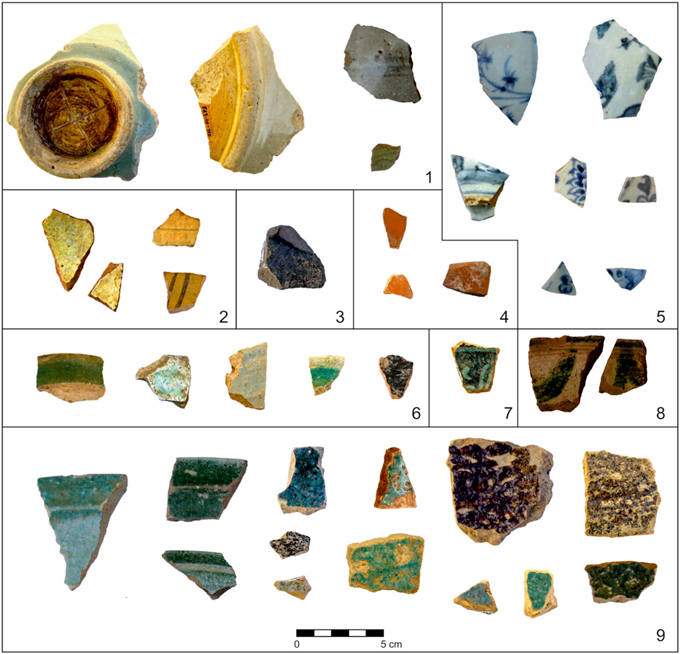
Imported wares found in Sheikh. Among them are yellow Yemenite wear, Indian red ware and Chinese porcelaine

=== Precolonial era ===
As the town of Fardowsa/Sheikh began to decline. The Sheikh Pass continued as an important road for caravans destined towards the coastal Berbera. In which the local Isa Musa tribe facilitated trade by protecting the caravans through the Sheikh Pass, in exchange for payment.

The Musa Jibril is a sub-tribe of the Isa Musa which used to levy toll on the Sheikh Pass and the coast roads from the East,

==== Sheikh Tariqa ====
Sayyid Adan Ahmad was a Sunni Islamic scholar and a jurist, who worked towards the revival of the Sunnah and rejecting Bid´ah and Shirk. The town of Sheikh was revived by a religious community "Tariqa" led by Sayyid Adan Ahmed in the 19th century, after a return from Hejaz in which he stayed for a decade. Sayyid Adan studied and received his authorization Ijazah under either Shaykh Sayyid Muhammad ad-Dandarawi or Sayyid Ibrahim Al Rashid, a student of Sayid-Ahmad ibn Idris al-Fezi.

The settlement was founded by Sheikh Aadan Ahmad of the Habar Awal clan about 1885.

Professor L. M. Lewis estimated that the religious settlement was founded in 1885. However, historian Sayid-Ahmed Dhegey, a descendant of one of the founders, Haji Jama Hannas, argued that it was established 30 years earlier, i.e. 1850–1855. Further supporting this earlier timeline, Josef Menges' encounter with Sayyid Adan Ahmad in 1882 suggests that the settlement predates Lewis's estimate, indicating its existence well before 1885.

Upon his return, he established religious communities in Sheikh and Hahi. The religious community later on resulted in Sheikh becoming a modern township.

During his lifetime, Sayyid Adan Ahmed had a reputation of piety, and was commonly approached to act as an arbitrator in lineage disputes.

The German explorer Josef Menges encountered Sayyid Adan Ahmad, but only after facing significant resistance from a group of sheikhs belonging to the religious community led by Sayyid Adan. The sheikhs were returning to the plateau when they confronted the German explorer and his party, suspecting them of being spies seeking to seize their land. Initially, they attempted to block their advance by force. Only after a lengthy discussion did Menges's guide manage to convince the sheikhs that they were merely sports hunters in search of elephants, allowing them to continue their journey.

Later on, the German explorer offered Sayyid Adan Ahmad a gift worth six thalers as a customary token of gratitude for his stay in the territory.

As usual, I naturally had to thank the holy man for my stay in his territory with a gift worth approximately six thalers. Sheikh Ahaden [Adan] lives on this plain with only a dozen "wodadin" [Wadaad].

== Demographics ==
Sheikh is primarily inhabited by the Mohamed Isa sub-division of the Isa Musa, Habr Awal Isaaq. As well as a smaller presence of Habr Yunis Isaaq.

The German explorer Josef Menges, describes the demographic makeup of the wider district that includes Sheikh in 1882:

The territory of the Isa Musa extends to this plain, and they have one of their general assembly points close to the ruins [Fardowsa Ruins]. Further to the west begins the territory of the Habr Juni [Habr Yunis], whom i visited from here

== Administrative division ==
Most maps still indicate that the Sheikh District is one of the three districts in the Togdheer region/province, cf. the old 1986 administrative division of Somalia. However, an administrative redivision took place in 2002, transferring Sheikh District to the newly created Saaxil region, which initially became composed of five districts. In 2019, Saaxil's administrative divisions were reorganized and further divided, this time into eight districts. In the process, Sheikh's position as the capital of its own district was confirmed; see Art. 10.1 of the Regions and Districts Self-management Law, No. 23/2019. The boundaries of the 8 districts were not spelled out in the law and so it is unclear which settlements are in Sheikh's district, apart from Sheikh itself.

== Climate ==
Sheikh has a warm semi-arid steppe climate (BSh in the Köppen Climate Classification), tempered by the substantial altitude at which the town is situated, with an average annual temperature of 19.1 °C. Temperature variation is limited; the coldest month is January (average 14.4 °C); the warmest June (22.5 °C). Rainfall amounts to about 466 mm annually. April – May is the first rainy season (the so-called Gu rains) and these are also the two wettest months in which about 70mm falls. From August – October, there is a second rainy season (the so-called Dayr rains). Incidentally, rainfall can vary greatly from year to year. The dry season is from November – March.

== Decline ==
The abandonment of Fardowsa is considered part of a broader regional crisis that emerged in the early 16th century and contributed to the reshaping of the political and economic landscape of the Horn of Africa. This period of decline has been linked to multiple interconnected factors, particularly disruptions to long-standing trade networks.

One major factor was the reduction in trade with China following the implementation of export bans from 1521 onward, which weakened commercial links that had previously supported regional economies. Another significant development was the arrival of the Portuguese in the Indian Ocean. Beginning in 1508, Portuguese forces pursued an aggressive policy in the Red Sea, including the occupation of Socotra and attacks on key ports such as Zeila (1517) and Berbera (1518). These military actions disrupted maritime trade routes that were vital to settlements in central Somaliland, including Fardowsa.

At the same time, the region experienced widespread political and social upheaval. This included the invasion of the Ethiopian highlands by the Muslim forces of the Barr Saʿd al-Dīn sultanate, followed by their defeat by Ethiopian armies, as well as the large-scale migration of Oromo groups from the south.

Despite this turbulent context, archaeological evidence suggests that Fardowsa was abandoned relatively peacefully. This contrasts with nearby sites such as Biyo Gure, where significant destruction has been documented, indicating a more violent end.

== See also ==
- Kal-Sheikh
