= IIDA Women's Development Organisation =

Non-governmental organisation founded in Mogadishu, Somalia

- Founded: 25 May 1991
- Founder: Halima Abdi Arush; Starlin Abdi Arush
- Type: Non-profit; NGO
- Headquarters: Mogadishu, Somalia
- Fields: peacebuilding, active citizenship for women, training
- Website: www.iida.so

IIDA Women's Development Organisation (IIDA) is a non-governmental organisation founded in Mogadishu, Somalia by a group of Somali women leaders to provide relief and emergency services to women and children affected by the civil war in Somalia. Over the years, IIDA has evolved to focus on policy development and strengthening accountability of government institutions. The organisation advocates for the rights of vulnerable children, youth, and women; and promotes peace among communities.

== Establishment ==
The IIDA Women's Development Organisation NGO was founded in Mogadishu on 25 May 1991 by a group of Somali women activists led by the sisters Halima and Starlin Arush. Halima Arush was a former education inspector whose husband had been killed during the civil war in Somalia. The organisation's aim was to create an interface organization enabling action in favour of peacebuilding, humanitarianism and women's rights. The word iida in the Somali language means "woman born on a feast day". It was chosen by the late Amina Abdullahi Haji Fiqow, a Somali human rights activist.

== Mission ==
To advocate for the socio-economic rights of vulnerable children, youth, and women, promote peace among warring communities, and foster their integration into society. We work towards non-violent conflict resolution, policy formulation and implementation, women empowerment, transparency and accountability, high standards of service delivery, education, economic self-sustenance, and improvement of health. We conduct research, defend rights, reduce mortality rate, establish partnerships, and mobilize communities towards gender equality, human rights, peace, development, and reconciliation

== Offices ==
IIDA is currently maintains three branches in Somalia (Mogadishu, Merca, Dhusamareb). It also has an office one in Nairobi, Kenya (since December 2007), and one in Turin, Italy.

== Main projects ==
IIDA's main projects encompass peacebuilding, active citizenship for women, and other initiatives in the education, health and economy sectors.

Projects have included:

- Reestablishing and operating in collaboration with the Italian NGO CISP the maternity hospital of Forlanini Hospital in Mogadishu, and providing trained to medical personnel.
- Disarmament of 150 irregular youth soldiers in the Merca area.
- Women's empowerment projects implemented via the Somali Women Agenda. The platform brings together 16 women's associations and other individual members from all regions of Somalia, and draws a real program priorities, strategies and actions for the peace process and societal reconstruction. These last two initiatives were implemented in collaboration with the Italian NGO COSPE.

== Tahrib newsletter ==
Since June 2008, IIDA Italia has published Tahrib, an online newsletter aimed at raising awareness on the sociopolitical situation in Somalia. Contributors to the newsletter include Somalian MP Maryan Shekh Osman, President of the Italian section of the Women's International League for Peace and Freedom Giovanna Pagani, and journalist Kenneth Oduor.

== Awards ==
IIDA has received various international awards for its peacebuilding, human rights and development work:

- UNIFEM Global Award 1996, awarded by Boutros Boutros-Ghali, then Secretary General of the United Nations, in New York City on 26 October 1996 at the occasion of the 20th anniversary of UNIFEM;
- Prize for Human Rights of the French Republic, awarded in Paris on 10 décembre 2008 on the 60th anniversary of the adoption of the Universal Declaration of Human Rights.

== Memberships ==
IIDA is a member of the following networks:

- Eastern African Sub-regional Support Initiative for the Advancement of Women (EASSI)
- Fédération des Femmes Africaines pour la Paix (FERFAP)
- Network of Women from the Mediterranean, the East and the South of Europe (Network Women)
