= Berbera District =

Coordinates: 10.4392°N 45.0101°E

Berbera District Degmada Barbara
- District
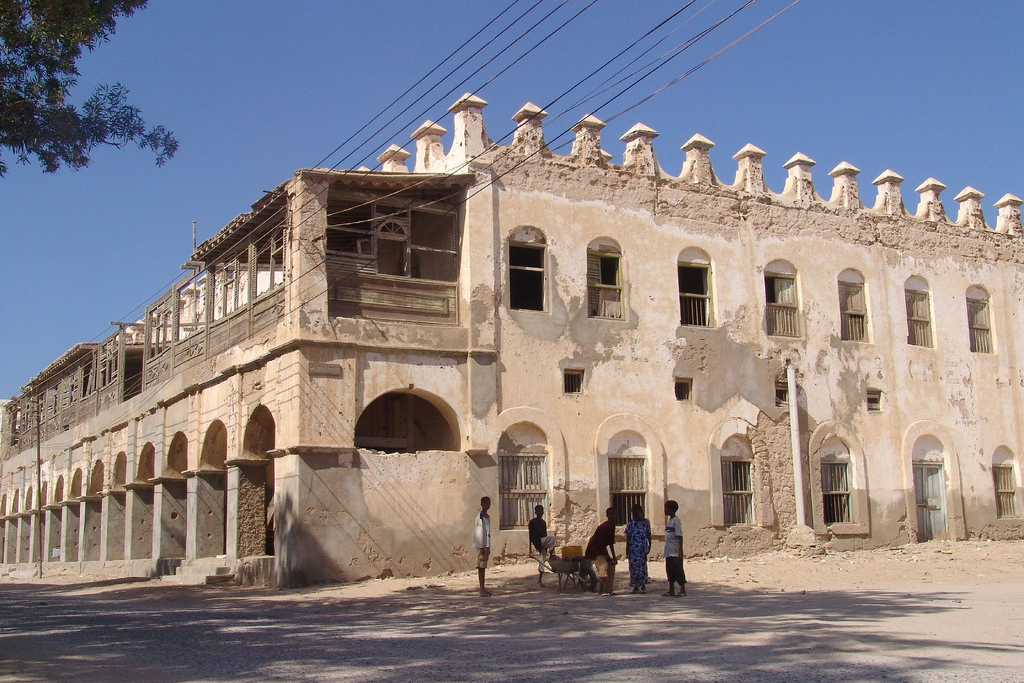
- Ottoman architecture in Berbera

- Location of Berbera district in Sahil, Somaliland
- Country: Somaliland
- Region: Sahil
- Capital: Berbera

Population (2005)
  - Total: 60,753
- Time zone: UTC+3 (EAT)

Berbera District (Somali: Degmada Barbara) is a district of the Sahil province in Somaliland. Its capital lies at Berbera.

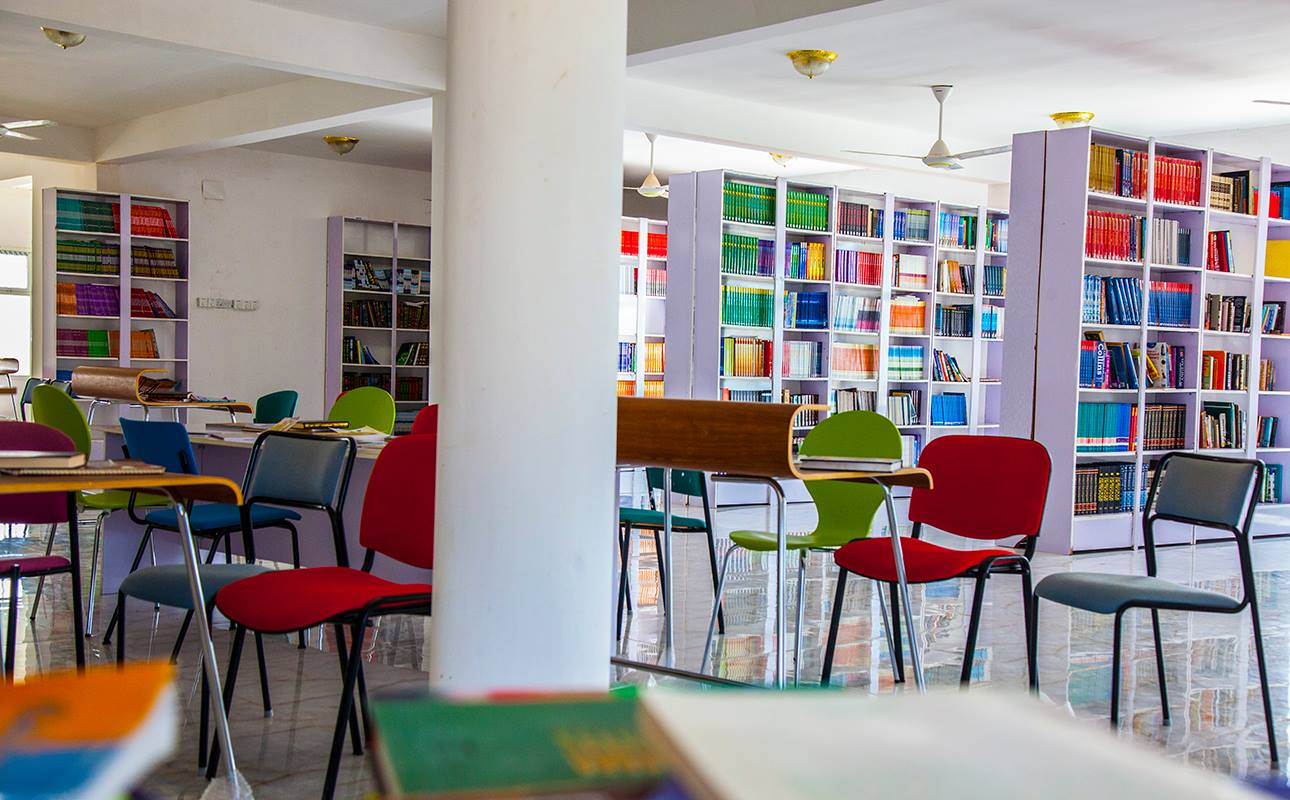

It is inhabited by people from the Isamusa sub-clan of the Isaaq Somalis.

== See also ==
- Administrative divisions of Somaliland
- Regions of Somaliland
- Districts of Somaliland
