= List of Red Army Faction (Baader-Meinhof) assassinations =

This is a list of people assassinated by the West German left-wing terrorist group Red Army Faction or the Baader-Meinhof group.

Target	Title	Date	Place	Country
Norbert Schmid	German police officer	22 October 1971	Hamburg	West Germany
Herbert Schoner	German police officer	22 December 1971	Kaiserslautern	West Germany
Paul A. Bloomquist	US Army soldier	11 May 1972	Frankfurt am Main	West Germany
Gerta Buddenberg (survived)	spouse of Federal Judge	16 May 1972	Karlsruhe	West Germany
Ronald A. Woodward	US Army soldier	24 May 1972	Heidelberg	West Germany
Charles L. Peck	US Army soldier	24 May 1972	Heidelberg	West Germany
Clyde R. Bonner	US Army soldier	24 May 1972	Heidelberg	West Germany
Andreas von Mirbach	German military attaché	24 April 1975	Stockholm	Sweden
Heinz Hillegaart	German trade attaché	24 April 1975	Stockholm	Sweden
Fritz Sippe	German police officer	7 May 1976	Sprendlingen	West Germany
Siegfried Buback	Federal prosecutor	7 April 1977	Karlsruhe	West Germany
Jürgen Ponto	CEO of Dresdner Bank	30 July 1977	Oberursel	West Germany
Heinz Marcisz	Schleyer's driver	5 September 1977	Cologne	West Germany
Roland Pieler	German police officer	5 September 1977	Cologne	West Germany
Reinhold Brändle	German police officer	5 September 1977	Cologne	West Germany
Helmut Ulmer	German police officer	5 September 1977	Cologne	West Germany
Hanns Martin Schleyer	Chairman of the German Employers' Association	18 October 1977	Mulhouse	France
Arie Kranenburg	Dutch policeman	22 September 1977	Utrecht	Netherlands
Hans-Wilhelm Hansen	German police officer	24 September 1978	Dortmund	West Germany
Dionysius de Jong	Dutch custom official	1 November 1978	Kerkrade	Netherlands
Johannes Goemanns	Dutch custom official	1 November 1978	Kerkrade	Netherlands
Ernst Zimmerman	CEO of MTU Aero Engines	1 February 1985	Gauting	West Germany
Frank Scarton	US Airman	8 August 1985	Rhein-Main Air Base	West Germany
Edward Pimental	U.S. Army soldier	8 August 1985	Wiesbaden	West Germany
Becky Bristol	U.S. Army civilian employee	8 August 1985	Rhein-Main Air Base	West Germany
Karl Heinz Beckurts	Siemens manager	9 July 1986	Straßlach	West Germany
Eckhard Groppler	Beckurts's driver	9 July 1986	Straßlach	West Germany
Gerold Braunmühl	German senior diplomat	10 October 1986	Bonn	West Germany
Alfred Herrhausen	Chairman of Deutsche Bank	30 November 1989	Bad Homburg vor der Höhe	West Germany
Detlev Karsten Rohwedder	Chief of the Treuhandanstalt	1 April 1991	Düsseldorf	Germany
Michael Newrzella	German Federal Police officer	27 June 1993	Bad Kleinen	Germany
