= Ahmed Abdulahi Waayeel =

Somali politician (2009-2009)

- احمد عبد اللّه واييل

Minister of Education in the Transitional Federal Government of Somalia
- In office 21 February 2009 – 3 December 2009
- Prime Minister: Omar Sharmarke
- Preceded by: Aidid Abdullahi Ilka-Hanaf
- Succeeded by: Abdinur Sheikh Mohamed

Personal details
- Died: 3 December 2009 Mogadishu, Somalia
- Cause of death: Assassination by explosive

Ahmed Abdulahi Waayeel (Somali: Axmed Cabdullaahi Waayeel, Arabic: احمد عبد اللّه واييل; died 3 December 2009) was a Somali politician who served as the Minister of Education in the Transitional Federal Government.

He was killed, along with Minister of Health Qamar Aden Ali and Minister of Higher Education Ibrahim Hassan Addow, in a suicide bombing at the Hotel Shamo in Mogadishu, the capital of Somalia, on 3 December 2009.

== See also ==
- Politics of Somalia
