= Dick and Enid Eyeington =

British aid workers to Somaliland who were murdered

Richard "Dick" Eyeington (November 1 1940 – October 22 2003) and Enid Eyeington (née Pratt; October 25 1941 – October 22 2003) were a married British couple. Richard and Enid worked as aid workers to Somaliland until their murders in 2003.

== Southern Africa ==
From 1971 to 1995, the Eyeingtons worked at the world-famous Waterford Kamhlaba, a multiracial secondary school in Swaziland which was opened by Michael Stern in 1963 after the introduction of apartheid laws in 1948. Many South African children – black and white, rich and poor – were educated there and the school became renowned as a beacon of liberalism during apartheid.

Dick joined Waterford as a geography teacher, becoming head of geography, deputy head and finally, in 1984, headmaster. Enid also taught at the school, becoming the school nurse and head of hostels, as well as running the school's community services programme. Increasingly, she focused on nursing, setting up clinics for women and HIV sufferers and working with the community.

The couple were passionate anti-apartheid campaigners and, during Dick's tenure, they fostered an ethos of egalitarianism, creating a school that encouraged tolerance and vigorous debate. ANC and United Democratic Front speakers were brought from South Africa, and scholarships were set up for black South African students from the townships. Dick taught the three daughters of Nelson Mandela, who remained a close friend. His pupils also included Archbishop Desmond Tutu's children, and the future Swazi king Mswati III.

The actor Richard E Grant was also taught by Dick, and describes the couple as "completely and utterly dedicated to education in Africa". Recalling an unforgettable field trip with them to Lesotho where they found dinosaur footprints in the Lava Mountains, Mr Grant says that the lives of many students “were enriched by knowing these two extraordinary, unique and inspired individuals."

Richard Attenborough visited the school when he was in South Africa making Cry Freedom and became a trustee and a close friend of the Eyeingtons. Reflecting on their life and work, Lord Attenborough said, “I have never known two people who so consistently put their beliefs into action… the good they did during their lifetime today resonates in a multitude of hearts and minds and will continue to do so for many generations to come."

== SOS Sheikh Secondary School ==
In September 2002, Dick and Enid moved to Somaliland to take on the SOS Sheikh Secondary School, which is situated near Sheikh in a remote part of the central Somaliland, and a three hours’ drive from the country's capital, Hargeisa. The once-renowned boarding school was established in British Somaliland. It was mostly destroyed in fighting in 1989, and had fallen into further disrepair during the Somali civil war. By the time SOS set about restoring the school, it had been completely looted and then reduced to frameless structures standing in an open yard.

Following years of closure, the SOS Sheikh Secondary School reopened in January 2003 to its first 53 pupils. Many of the 45 boys and 8 girls who started at the school in 2003 had previously been denied any education by the civil war and the interclan fighting that followed it in this war-torn country. Another 50 pupils arrived in September 2003.

== Death ==
The Eyeingtons were gunned down as they watched television at their home in the compound of the recently reopened school.

Two weeks before their murders, Italian humanitarian Annalena Tonelli was killed in Borama by the same Islamist gunmen cell called al-Itihaad al-Islamiya.
