= Deqa Yasin =

Somali politician and activist

Deqa Yasin Hagi Yusuf
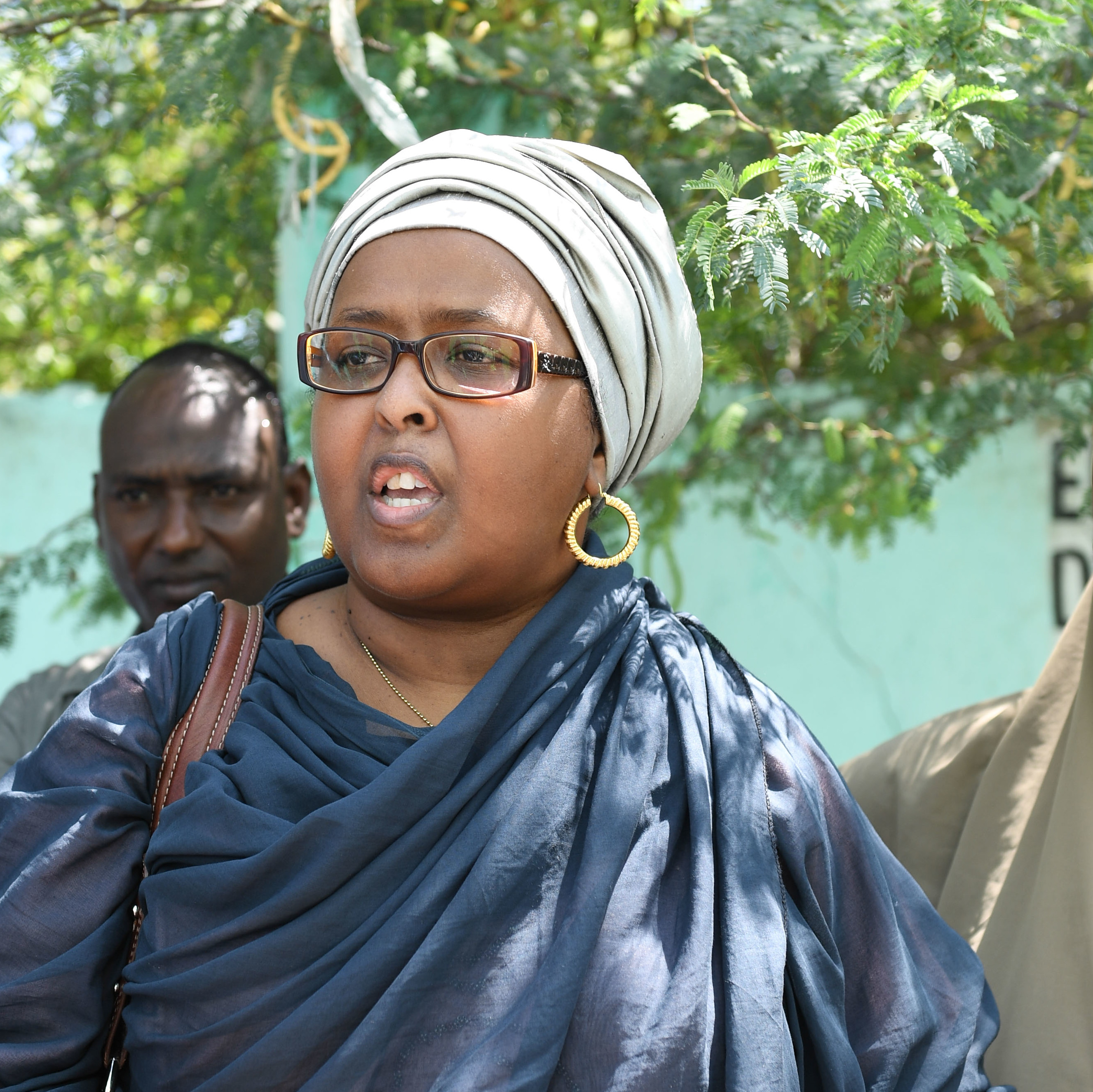

Minister of Women and Human Rights Development
- In office March 2017 – October 2020

Personal details
- Born: Merka, Somalia
- Occupation: human rights advocate

Deqa Yasin Hagi Yusuf is a Somali human rights advocate and social justice activist, specifically in the areas of gender equality, women's empowerment, disability, children and minority rights. In 2017 she was appointed the Minister for Women and Human Rights in Somalia and she served until October 2020.

== Life ==
Yusuf was born in Merka and raised in Somalia. Yusuf completed her university studies in Turin in Italy in the late 1990s, where she worked as a cultural mediator and Youth Centre Coordinator at the Alouan Youth Centre. She supported cultural integration for second-generation immigrants, including assisting them in regularising their legal status to enable them to access their rights to education and employment. She helped found the Comitato di Solidarietà con il Popolo Somalo (the Solidarity Committee with the Somali People) in the Piemonte Region to raise funds in aid of people affected by the civil war in Somalia. Deqa moved to Toronto in Canada, in the early 2000s and worked as a civil servant, providing social services to vulnerable Canadian citizens for close to 10 years.

On her return to Somalia in 2012, she was involved in both women's empowerment and human rights as the Operations Manager for the IIDA Women's Development Organisation. a civil society organisation promoting peace building, women's empowerment and human rights in Somalia since 1991.

Deqa served as Minister of Women and Human Rights Development of the Federal Republic of Somalia between 2017 and 2020. In her capacity as minister, she, inter alia, led Somalia in the ratification process of the UN Convention on the Rights of Persons with Disabilities (CRPD). She organized women from across the country to develop the Somali Women’s Charter, a first for Somalia. She saw this as a time of change for women as they will be able to participate in the first one-person one vote election in Somalia in 2020/2021. Deqa also initiated numerous legislations designed to uphold and protect the rights of vulnerable groups. She actively participated in the advancement of global norms, standards and policies on human rights and conflict and fragility in her capacity as a member of the World Bank Group's first strategy for Fragility, Conflict, and Violence Sounding Board. She was also part of the advisory team for the Organization for Economic Cooperation and Development (OECD) study on Gender Equality and Women's Empowerment in Fragile and Conflict-Affected Situations.

Prior to her appointment as Minister, she was the Deputy Chair of the Federal Indirect Election Implementation Team (FIET) in Somalia in the 2016 Indirect Election. In her capacity as deputy chair, she contributed to the increased representation of women in the two houses of the 10th parliament from 14% in 2012 to 25%. Before assuming public office in 2016, Deqa worked as the Operations Manager of IIDA Women's Development Organisation., a leading civil society organisation promoting peacebuilding, women's empowerment, and human rights in Somalia established in 1991. It was during her work with IIDA that she represented Somali civil society in the New Deal for Somalia.

It was during H.E. Deqa Yasin's tenure, that the MoWHRD conducted a Rapid Assessment of the Status of Children with Disabilities in Somalia, released on 28 September 2020. This assessment reviewed the current situation of children with disabilities in the four Somali cities, namely, Mogadishu, Galkayo, Baidoa, and Kismayo. The assessment aimed to inform the efforts to strengthen interventions on the rights of children with Disabilities in Somalia. In carrying out this Assessment, the MoWHRD sought to understand the key barriers to the participation of children with disabilities in society, including their access to the services they are entitled to enjoy. in October 2020, her Ministry also carried out a rapid assessment of drug and substance abuse among children in street situations in Somalia.

Progress was made in the implementation of the 2016 Universal Periodic Review recommendations. These include the fulfilment of Somalia's human rights reporting obligations, specifically in the submission of the CRC initial State Party report, and the submission of Somalia's State Party Report on the Convention against Torture (CAT) that was overdue by almost thirty years and the submission of the mid-term review report for the Universal Periodic Review detailing progress in the implementation of the recommendations. The State Party reported on the International Covenant on Civil and Political Rights (ICCPR) had been finalized and would be submitted shortly to the UN Human Rights Committee.
