= Sahil, Somaliland =

Region of Somaliland

Sahil Saaxil (Somali) ساحل (Arabic)
- Region of Somaliland
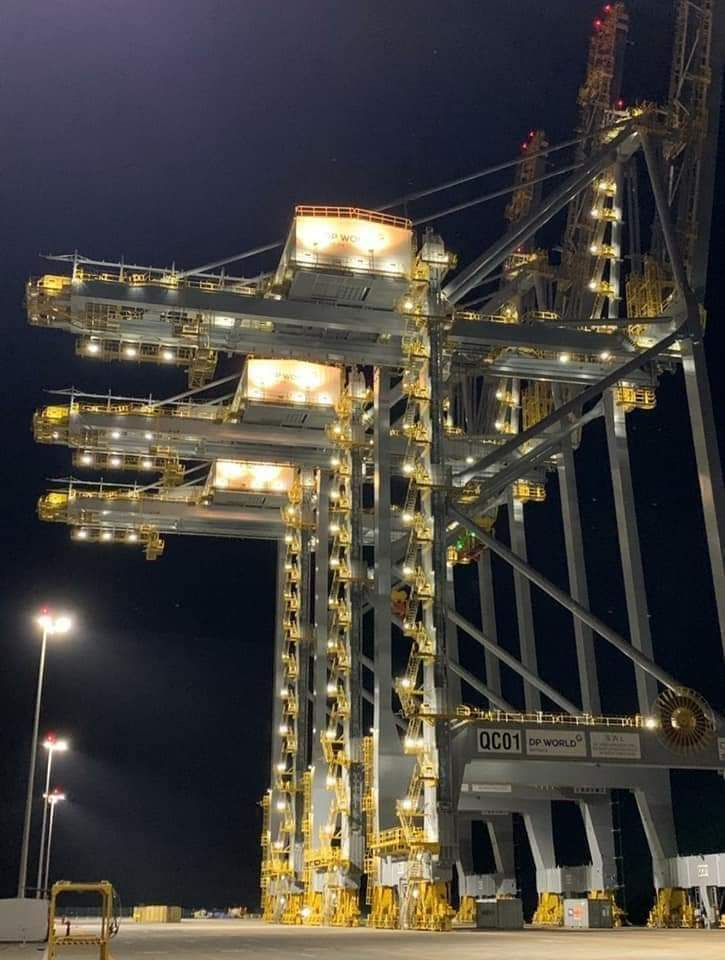
- DP World Berbera New Port

- Location in Somaliland
- Country: Somaliland
- Administrative centre: Berbera

Government
  - Governor: Cali Cabdi Cabdillaahi Faarax

Area
  - Total: 13,930 km^{2} (5,380 sq mi)
- Time zone: UTC+3 (EAT)

Sahil (Somali: Saaxil, Arabic: ساحل) is an administrative region (gobol) in northern Somaliland with the port city of Berbera as its capital. It was separated from Woqooyi Galbeed and became a province in 1991. In 1998, the Sheikh District of Togdheer was incorporated into Sahil region. The region has a long coastline facing the Gulf of Aden to the north. Sahil borders Awdal to the northwest, Maroodi Jeex to the southwest, Togdheer to the south and Sanaag to the east.

== Etymology ==
The name Sahil originates from the Arabic word “ساحل” which translates to Coast. The name was used to refer to northern Somali coast of modern-day Somaliland.

== History ==
Formerly known as the Berbera District, it was one of six districts that made up the British Somaliland protectorate. In 1960, the then independent State of Somaliland merged with Italian Somaliland to form the Somali Republic. By 1964, the then Berbera District merged with the Borama district (now Awdal) and the Hargeisa district (now Maroodi Jeh) to form the Woqooyi Galbeed region (literally North West, also known as Hargeisa region).

During the period from 1968 to 1982, parts of the district were incorporated into Togdheer region. Awdal was carved out of the western parts of Woqooyi Galbeed region in June 1984. However, Sahil was the only of the six former British territories to be rebuilt during the Somali government's reign.

When the Somali Civil War broke out, the former British territory declared the revival of the pre-independent state of Somaliland. In December 1989, the Somaliland government established Sahil region. In 1998, the Sheikh District was incorporated from Togdheer. Under the Local Autonomy Act of 2002, it was positioned as one of the six regions that make up Somaliland.

The Somaliland was reorganized on March 22, 2008, and the territory of Sahil was changed. However, a new local government law came into force on January 4, 2020, and the territory was restored.

== Districts ==
Towns in Sahil

The regional capital of the Sahil region is the port city of Berbera. The region is further divided into the following two districts:

District	Grade	Capital	Comments	Location
Berbera	A	Berbera	Regional capital	
Sheikh	C	Sheikh		

== Demographics ==
According to the Somaliland Ministry of National Planning Sahil had a population of 149,244 in 1997.

The region is inhabited by the Isamusa sub-clan of the Isaaq, who are the majority of inhabitants. Minorities include, the Garhajis, primarily belonging to the Habr Yunis branch, the Habr Je'lo as well as the Arap, all clans of the wider Isaaq clan-family.

== Map ==
Map of Sahil Region

== See also ==
- Administrative divisions of Somaliland
- Regions of Somaliland
- Districts of Somaliland
- Somalia–Somaliland border
