= Benadir University =

University in Mogadishu, Somalia

Coordinates: 2.0786°N 45.2395°E

- جامعـــة بنـــادر
- Other name: BU
- Motto: CULTIVATING HUMAN TALENTS
- Type: Private
- Established: 2002; 24 years ago
- Rector: Dr. Mohamed Mohamud Hassan Biday
- Students: 13670 (2023)
- Location: Mogadishu, Banaadir, Somalia
- Campus: Prof. Addow Campus, Dr. Shahiid Campus (Km 13)
- Colors: Blue,
- Website: Official website

Benadir University (BU) (Somali: Jaamacadda Benaadir, Arabic: جامعـــة بنـــادر), also known as the University of Benadir, is a private university located in Mogadishu, Somalia.

== History ==
Benadir University was founded in October 2002 as a medical school to help train local doctors in Somalia.

On December 28, 2019, a bomb attack destroyed a minibus carrying Benadir University students, killing at least 76 people including 20 Benadir University students.

== See also ==
- 2009 Hotel Shamo bombing
