= Ibrahim Hassan Adow =

Somali scholar and politician

- إبراهيم حسن عدو
- Died: December 3, 2009; Hotel Shamo, Mogadishu
- Cause of death: Suicide bombing by Al-Shabaab
- Education: The American University
- Occupation: Foreign Secretary Islamic Courts Union Foreign Secretary Alliance for the Re-liberation of Somalia Education Minister of Transitional Federal Government
- Organization(s): Islamic Courts Union, Alliance for the Re-liberation of Somalia and Transitional Federal Government

Ibrahim Hassan Adow (Somali: Ibraahin Xasan Caddoow, Arabic: إبراهيم حسن عدو) (died December 3, 2009) was a Somali scholar and politician. He was the dean of Benadir University.

Adow became the head of the Foreign Affairs department for Islamic Courts Union as it rose to power during the early 2000s. He later worked in the same role for the Alliance for the Re-liberation of Somalia during the Ethiopian military occupation. He later served the Minister of Education for Transitional Federal Government.

He was assassinated during the 2009 Hotel Shamo attack carried out by an Al-Shabaab suicide bomber.

== Biography ==
Adow lived in the United States for nearly 25 years and worked as an administrator at the American University in Washington, D.C., before returning to his native Somalia in 2002.

=== Islamic Courts Union ===
After returning to Somalia, he worked as the dean of Benadir University in Mogadishu. As the Islamic Courts Union (ICU) was rising to power in the city soon after he arrived, he joined the group. Adow represented the ICU in its ongoing discussions in Khartoum and Nairobi with the Somali Transitional Federal Government (TFG). Adow publicly called on the international community to pressure Ethiopian troops that had started invading Somalia in June 2006 to diplomatically pressure a withdrawal.

==== Khartoum accords ====
Adow was the leading figure on the Islamic Courts side of the Khartoum talks. For the TFG, the leading figure was speaker of parliament Sharif Hassan Sheikh Aden. In September 2006 he announced that though the Islamic Courts had the power to declare themselves Somalia's government, they had refrained from doing so to maintain peace with the TFG. By October 2006, Adow had adopted a more confrontational stance towards the TFG due to the increasing numbers of Ethiopian troops invading Somalia. That month he would announce to Somali media:

"As long as there is a single Ethiopian soldier inside Somalia, we will not talk with the government"

=== Transitional Government ===
Soon after the Ethiopian withdrawal from Mogadishu, Adow returned to the capital.

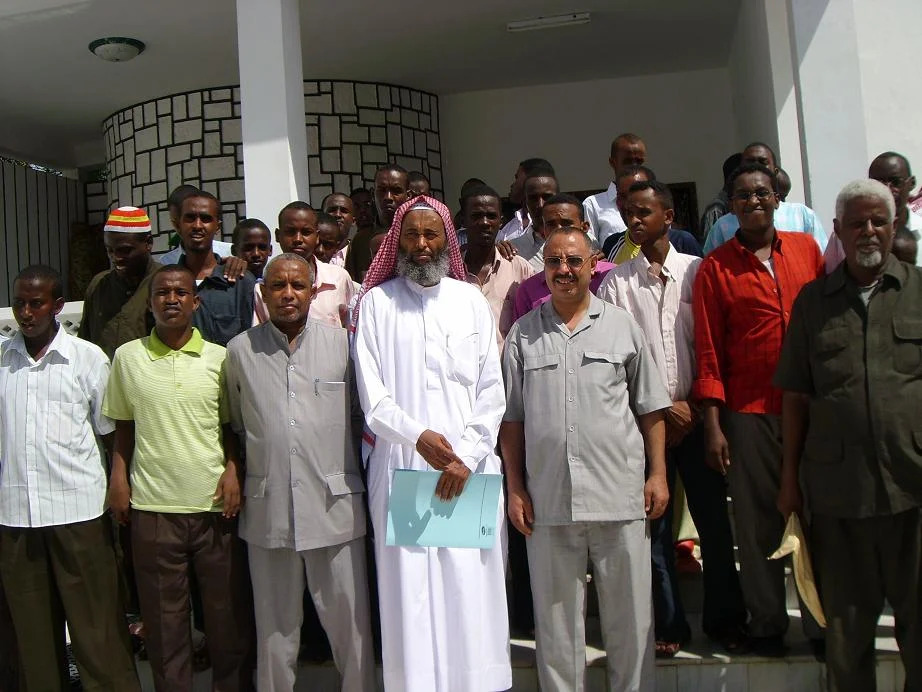
Education Minister Ibrahim Hassan Adow several months before his death during a ceremony for students awarded scholarships from Yemen (October 2009)

== Death ==
On December 3, 2009, a graduation ceremony was being held at the Shamo Hotel in Mogadishu for medical students from Benadir University. While Adow, other ministers, students and professors and journalists were partaking in the ceremony, a suicide bomber from Al-Shabaab detonated in the packed audience. Adow and 21 others were killed, and more than 60 were wounded.
