= Garad Jama Garad Ismail Duale =

Garaad Jaamac Garaad Ismaaciil Ducaale
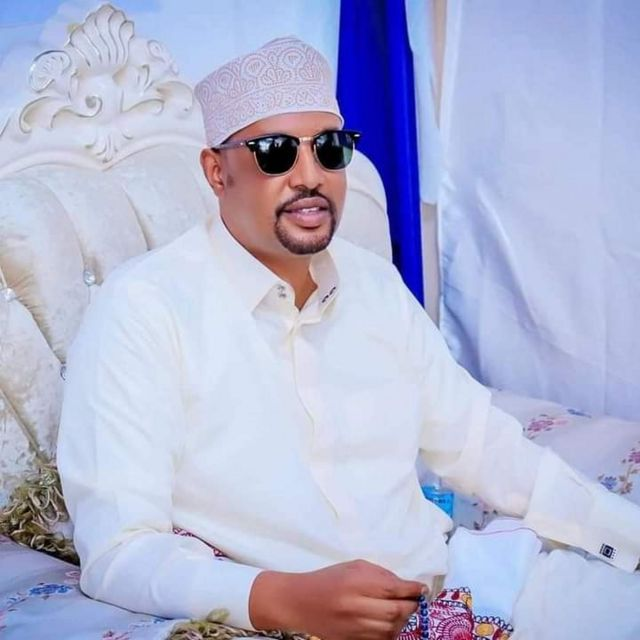

Garad of the Jama Siad branch of the Dhulbahante clan
- Predecessor: Garad Ismail Duale Guled
- Born: Las Anod, Somali Democratic Republic
- Father: Garad Ismail Duale Guled

Garad Jama Garad Ismail Duale (Somali: Garaad Jaamac Garaad Ismaaciil Ducaale) is the one-highest traditional leader in the Sool region of SSC-Khaatumo State of Somalia

]]. Garad is a title, Jama being his personal name and Ismail being his father's personal name (who also has the title of Garad). Jama is the 2nd Garad of Jama Siad clan of Mohamoud Garad of Dhulbahante.

== Biography ==
Jama was born in 1971 as a son of Garad Ismail Duale Guled. He was born into the clan of Jama Siad (Jaamac Siyaad) of Mohamoud Garad of Dhulbahante.

Jama moved abroad after graduating from high school.

In 2007, militias of the Jama Siad clan, together with militias of the Baharsame clan, occupied Las Anod, which was effectively controlled by Puntland, in the name of the Somaliland force. Soon after, the main Somaliland force joined them.

=== Appointed as Garad ===
In 2008, Jama's father died in Las Anod. Jama returned to the country and became Garad in 2009.

Two people were declared Garad of Jama Siad clan, each taking office. One is Jama, of this article, who took office at Las Anod on June 22, 2009. (Hereafter he is written as "Garad Jama Garad Ismail".) The other is Abdirashid (Cabdirashiid Garaad Ismaaciil), who took office the same day in Yagori.

=== SSC and Khatumo State ===
In 2009, when the SSC, a move to make the Dulbahante inhabited area part of the Federal Republic of Somalia, was formed, Garad Jama Garad Ismail was considered one of the most important traditional leaders along with Garad Jama Garad Ali (do not confuse him with the subject of this article) and Garad Ali Burale.

The SSC effectively ceased operations around 2012 and the SSC President announced its integration into Somaliland; the Dhulbahante rebel movement was taken over by the Khatumo State.

In April 2014, Garad Jama Garad Ismail visited Hargeisa, the capital of Somaliland, as a traditional elder representing Khatumo State.

In September 2015, the Khatumo government, pursued by the Somaliland force, held a meeting in Balli Ad. Garad Jama Garad Ali surfaced to attend, but Garad Jama Garad Ismail, along with many other elders, announced his absence. This effectively withdrew Garad Jama Garad Ismail from the Khatumo State.

=== Mediator ===
In January 2016, Garad Jama Garad Ismail attended a conference on philanthropy and anti-corruption in Las Anod.

In July 2016, Garad Jama Garad Ismail, along with Garad Jama Garad Ali, took a position against Somaliland while sending ministers from his clan to the Somaliland government.

In October 2017, Khatumo State came to an end when President Ali Khalif Galaydh announced its integration into Somaliland.

In July 2018, Garad Jama Garad Ismail proposed that the Somaliland government not be involved in the peace process regarding the inter-clan struggle that occurred in El Afweyn, while praising the Somaliland government for its work in arbitrating the struggle to date.

In January 2022, Garad Jama Garad Ismail arbitrated an inter-clan conflict in Saah-maygag and Sangejabiye in which over 20 people were killed.

=== 2023 Las Anod conflict ===
On December 31, 2022, Garad Jama Garad Ismail called for the complete withdrawal of Somaliland forces from Las Anod, citing the massacre of civilians participating in a demonstration protesting the assassination of a politician in Las Anod. The perpetrators of the politician's assassination were unknown. At this point, Garad Jama Garad Ismail was the only one in Las Anod of the 13 highest traditional leaders of Dhulbahante. According to information received by the BBC, Garad Jama Garad Ismail is said to be the person who organized the locals to resist the Somaliland force.

On January 4, 2023, Yasin Haji Mohamoud, a former Somaliland politician, called for the return of Somaliland force to Las Anod, but Garad Jama Garad Ismail expressed opposition to this as it would worsen the situation.

On February 6, 2023, the traditional elders of Dhulbahante gathered in Las Anod and declared the secession of SSC-Khatumo from Somaliland, with Garad Jama Garad Ali at its head. Garad Jama Garad Ismail also participated, he is considered the third in the pecking order. In early February, Garad Jama Garad Ismail again demanded the withdrawal of Somaliland forces from Las Anod.

On March 24, Garad Jama Garad Ismail led an SSC delegation to Garowe, the capital of Puntland, to meet with a peace delegation from Mogadishu. On March 25, he met with the vice president of Puntland.
