= Abdikarim Adan Haji Diriye =

Somali politician

- Cabdikariim Adan Xaaji Diiriye
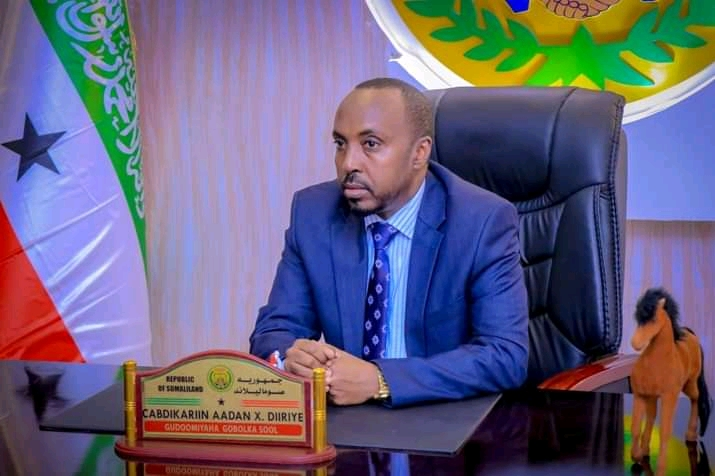

Governor of Gebiley
- In office 29 June 2020 – 2 November 2021
- President: Muse Bihi Abdi
- Succeeded by: Abdiqani Mohamoud Jidhe

Governor of Sool
- In office 2 November 2021 – 12 January 2025
- President: Muse Bihi Abdi
- Preceded by: Abdiqani Mohamoud Jidhe
- Succeeded by: Ahmed Farah Osman Abdi

Personal details
- Born: 1975 Maydh, Sanaag, Somaliland

Abdikarim Adan Haji Diriye (Somali: Cabdikariim Adan Xaaji Diiriye; born 1975) is a Somaliland politician who served as Governor of Sool from November 2021 until 12 January 2025 and earlier as Governor of Gebiley from 29 June 2020 to 2 November 2021.

== Early life ==
He was born in Maydh, the historic coastal town in the Sanaag region. He belongs to the Isaaq (Habar Yoonis; also romanized “Habar Yonis”) clan-family.

== Career ==
On 29 June 2020, Diriye was appointed Governor of Gebiley in a presidential reshuffle and served until 2 November 2021.

In November 2021, he became Governor of Sool. His appointment and the simultaneous appointment of a new Las Anod police commander (a Dhulbahante/Baharsame) were viewed by many Las Anod elites as harsh and as obstructing local progress.

On 20 December 2021, he cautioned traditional elders in Adhi'adeye against clan violence. On 24 February 2022, he inspected the Sool regional police command in Las Anod during a weekly security briefing. On 29 August 2022, he took part in discussions on the JPLG programme expansion and planning for 2023/2027 with national and partner institutions. On 12 January 2023, he attended a meeting in Las Anod between Somaliland authorities and traditional leaders amid rising tensions.

On 12 January 2025, he was succeeded as Governor of Sool by Ahmed Farah Osman Abdi by presidential decree.

Political offices
Preceded by Abdiqani Mohamoud Jidhe	Governor of Sool; 2021–2025	Succeeded by Ahmed Farah Osman Abdi
