= Dhummay =

Dhummay Dhumay
- Town
- Location
- Country: Somaliland
- Region: Sool
- Region: Las Anod District

Population (2007)
  - Total: 960
- Time zone: UTC+3 (EAT)

Dhummay is a town in the Sool region of Somaliland. It is 35 miles south of Las Anod, the regional capital of Sool.

Although there have been clan conflicts for a long time, they have distanced themselves from both Somaliland and Puntland, and in 2018 they held a peace agreement with the help of Ethiopia after rejecting interference from Somaliland/Puntland governments.

Since then, relations with Somaliland have continued, including visits by key officials of the Somaliland government.

== Demographics ==
The town is inhabited by the Dhulbahante clan, with the Bahrarsame of the Farah Garad and the Abdi Garad being well represented.

== Recent History ==
In 2017, it was the centre of raging conflict between two sub-clans whom both inhabit the city.

Relation map

In October 2018, at least 50 people were killed and 100 others injured in a struggle between two clans in Dhummay. Both warring clans are tributaries of Dhulbahante. The Somali federal government sent a plane carrying medical supplies for those injured in the conflict, but the Somaliland government refused to allow the plane to land at the airport.

In November, 300 people from the two clans involved in the Dhummay conflict gathered in Jijiga, Ethiopia, for a peace conference organized by Mustafa Mohammed Omar, governor of Somali Region, Ethiopia. Meanwhile, a Somaliland delegation also attempted to intervene in the conflict, but was rejected by the parties. The Puntland government was also rejected.

The Somaliland government admitted that the initiative to resolve the Dhummay dispute has been transferred to Ethiopia and that the Somaliland government is not involved. Also in November, the Boqor of the Majeerteen clan, Burhaan, visited Dhummay and discussed the surrounding conflict with local intellectuals. He welcomed the meeting in Jijiga.

In June 2020, Abdiqani Mohamoud Jidhe, governor of Sool of Somaliland, visited Dhummay to witness the groundbreaking ceremony for the well.

== See also ==
- Administrative divisions of Somaliland
- Regions of Somaliland
- Districts of Somaliland
- Somalia–Somaliland border
