= Garad Mukhtar Garad Ali =

Garad Mukhtar Garad Cali
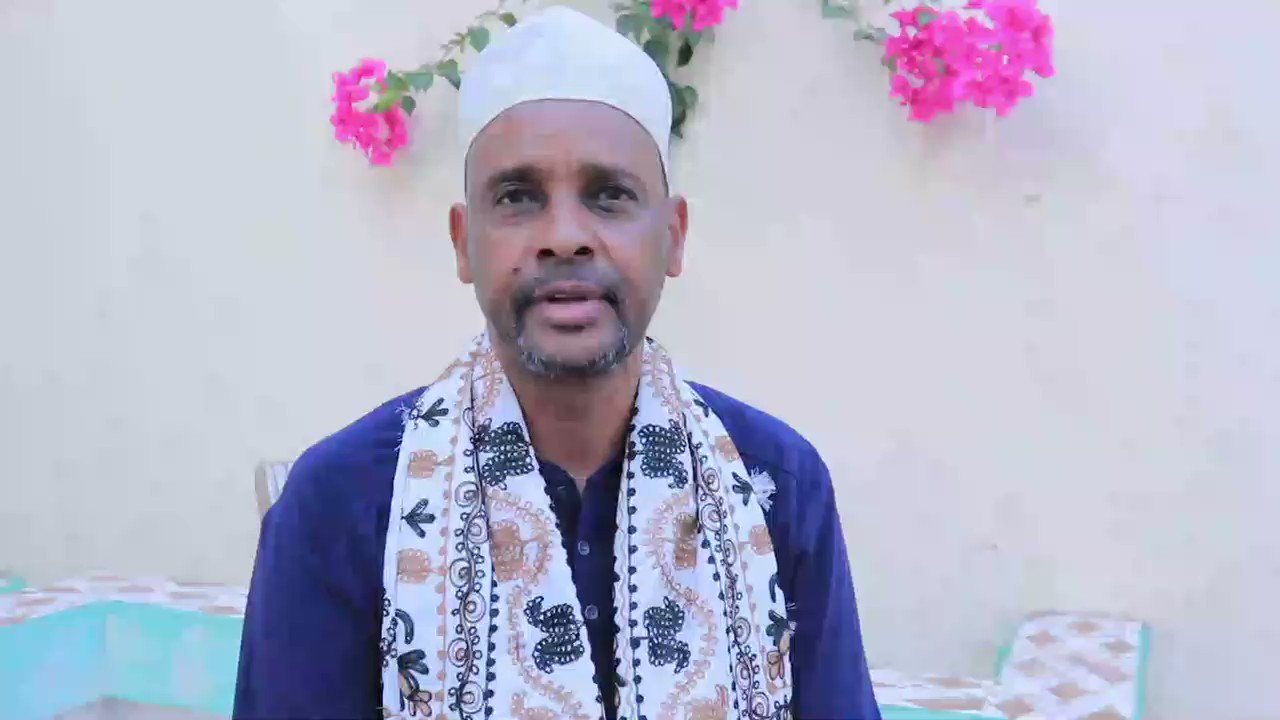

Garad of the Qayaad branch of the Dhulbahante clan
- Predecessor: Garaad Cali Buraale Xasan
- Born: Dharkayn Geenyo
- Spouses: Garaado farxiya bundubte
- Father: Garaad Cali Buraale Xasan
- Religion: Islam

Garad Mukhtar Garad Ali Burale (Somali: Garaad Mukhtaar Garaad Cali Buraalle) is one of the traditional leaders in the Sool region.

== Biography ==
Mukhtar's father Ali founded and led a new community in Dharkayn Geenyo in July 1999. Mukhtar was born in Dharkayn Geenyo at the end of the 20th century.

=== Installed as Garad ===
In February 2018, his father Garad Ali Burale Hassan died.

On March 12, 2020, in Dharkayn Geenyo, Mukhtar was officially installed as Garad of Qayaad. Mukhtar's inauguration was attended by dignitaries from Puntland, Somaliland, and the Somali regional government of Ethiopia. Somaliland's Minister of Information, Suleiman Yusuf Ali, stated this place is within Somaliland. The deputy minister of the Puntland Ministry of Women's Affairs stated this place belongs to Puntland. However, Garad Jama Garad Ali, concluding the inauguration, said that the people of the region do not belong to either Puntland or Somaliland.

=== 2023 Las Anod conflict ===
At the end of 2022, fighting broke out in Las Anod between Somaliland forces and some residents that resulted in deaths. On January 5, 2023, Somaliland forces temporarily withdrew from the urban area of Las Anod to a base outside of the city to avoid chaos. As the Somaliland forces withdrew, some of the traditional elders of Dhulbahante, who had previously avoided Las Anod, came there. The Somaliland forces did not restrict these traditional elders from visiting Las Anod.

On January 21 Garad Mukhtar came to Las Anod.

On February 6, the Dhulbahante Elders of Sool declared independence from the Somaliland and Puntland administrations and created a local government, SSC-Khaatumo, under the direct control of the Federal Republic of Somalia, and established a local committee of 33 elders, of which Garad Mukhtar was elected one of them.

On February 25, Garad Mukhtar confirmed the resumption of fighting between the two sides engaged, stressing that war had begun in the city.

Garad Mukhtar said the most important precondition for dialogue is a ceasefire and said which has not yet been achieved.

On March 13, Garad Mukhtar met with a panelist of UN experts as one of the representatives of SSC-Khatumo.
