= Ahmed Qaybe =

Somali politician

His Excellency Ahmed Mohamed Adan
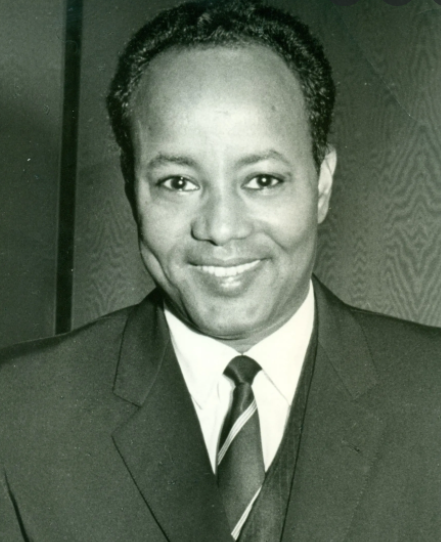

3rd Speaker of the Somaliland House of Representatives
- In office 1997–2005
- Preceded by: Ahmed Abdi Mohamed
- Succeeded by: Abdirahman Mohamed Abdullahi

Foreign minister of Somalia
- In office 1990–1991
- Preceded by: Ahmed Jama Abdulle Jangali
- Succeeded by: Muhammad Ali Hamoud

Personal details
- Born: 1930 Aden, Yemen
- Died: 26 November 2013 (aged 83) Hargeisa, Somaliland
- Occupation: Politician, diplomat

Ahmed Mohamed Adan (known as Qaybe) was the foreign minister of Somalia from 1990 until 1991. He was Somalia's Ambassador to the United States, Soviet Union, Britain, and the United Nations. He was the speaker of House of Representatives of Somaliland from 1997 to 2005.

== Biography ==
Qaybe was born in Aden, Yemen in the 1930s. He was born at the Royal Naval Base in Khormaksar District. He is from the Dhulbahante clan.

His father served in the British Forces. His mother is Kaaha Warsame Malo-bi'iye. His father returned to Somaliland and he spent his childhood with his uncle. He learned so diligently that he was given the nickname Qaybe (one who memorizes).

=== Early career ===
After high school, he worked at a radio station in Hargeisa. He returned to Yemen temporarily in the late 1940s.

He requested employment with the British Government of Somaliland, which was accepted, and he returned to British Somaliland in June 1954. Initially he was appointed District Secretary in Hargeisa. In 1956 he transferred to Berbera.

In September 1956, he traveled to England and stayed in Edinburgh via London, where he studied at the University of Edinburgh. He also enrolled at the Balliol College.

He returned to Hargeisa at the end of 1959. He became secretary of the Somaliland People's Assembly. In January 1960 he returned to London to study parliamentary procedure.

=== After Somalia's Independence ===
Somalia gained independence in 1960; in January 1961 he became one of the first seven ambassadors appointed by Somalia government. He was posted to Moscow.

In 1965, he was transferred to Washington.

In 1968, he returned to Somalia.

=== Under the Barre system ===
In 1969 Siad Barre staged a coup d'etat and became the dictator of Somalia.

In early 1970, Qaybe was again assigned to Moscow.

In 1975, he was posted to London as Ambassador to the United Kingdom. In 1980, he was posted to New York as Ambassador to the United Nations.

He said he also served as ambassador to Czechoslovakia, although the timing is unclear.

In 1985, he returned to Somalia and became Undersecretary of the Ministry of Foreign Affairs, a position he held for five years.

He was appointed Minister of Foreign Affairs of Somalia in 1990. He served for half year.

In 1991, the Somali Civil War was in full swing and he defected abroad.

=== Speaker of the House of Representatives of Somaliland ===
In 1991, Somaliland declared its restoration of independence.

In 1997, he returned to Somaliland and became Speaker of the House of Representatives.

In May 2002, Muhammad Haji Ibrahim Egal, the incumbent president of Somaliland, died during surgery in South Africa; a funeral service was held in Berbera, where Egal's father is buried, and Qaybe attended. In a 2011 interview after his retirement from the House of Representatives, Qaybe said that after the death of President Egal, a group of important Somaliland figures met and concluded that an acting president needed to be appointed immediately, and Qaybe agreed to have his vice president, Kahin, take over.

In August 2004, Qaybe submitted his resignation and closed the chamber after a confrontation with majority members. However, he later withdrew his resignation.

In September 2004, Qaybe determined that it would be extremely difficult to hold elections before May 2005, when the current parliament's term expires, and formally requested consulting services from the Academy for Peace and Development (APD) and Interpeace to draft an electoral law. In January 2005, after a contentious debate over the Somaliland election law, the deputy speaker of the House of Representatives submitted his resignation, which he soon withdrew. Some believe that Qaybe was pressured into this withdrawal. In March 2005, the Somaliland Election Law was passed by the House of Representatives, with Qaybe as its chairman. However, there were occasions when Qaybe left the room during the meeting because the debate was contentious.

In September 2005, The Somaliland parliamentary election was held in accordance with the Somaliland election law. In December 2005, President Somaliland invited new members of the House of Representatives and all former members of the House of Representatives to the Presidential Palace for a luncheon, where Qaybe gave a good-natured speech as former Speaker of the House.

=== Thereafter ===
In 2006, fighting broke out between the Dhulbahante clans in Buuhoodle; Qaybe called on both clans to engage in dialogue.

In February 2011, fighting broke out in Kalshaale near Buuhoodle. In response, Qaybe, who lives in Hargeisa, told reporters in an interview that he proposes an immediate cessation of hostilities.

On 26 November 2013, he died in Hargaysa. He was 84 years when he died The Somaliland government made Qaybe's funeral a state funeral. The Somali government also named one of its Foreign Ministry buildings after him in honor of Qaybe's achievements.

== Autobiography ==
- Axmed Maxamed Aadan (2013). Danjire Qaybe iyo caalamka [Ambassador Qaybe and the world]. Bobe Publications. ISBN 9780956117342.

Political offices
Preceded by Ali Jangali	Minister of Foreign Affairs of Somalia; 1990–1991	Succeeded by Garad Abdiqani Garad Jama
