= Yagori =

Yagoori ياغوري
- Town
- Location in Somalia
- Coordinates: 8°45′09″N 46°57′54″E
- Country: Somalia
- Regional State: Khatumo
- District: Las Anod

Area
  - Total: 1 km^{2} (0.39 sq mi)
  - Land: 1 km^{2} (0.39 sq mi)

Population (2014)
  - Total: 12,190
  - Density: 12,000/km^{2} (32,000/sq mi)
- Time zone: UTC+3 (EAT)

Yagori (Somali: Yagoori, Yaguri) is a town in the northern Sool Region of Somalia.

== Recent history ==
In January 1991, a peace conference was held in Yagori under the leadership of the Somali National Movement (later the government of Somaliland), and Habr Je'lo, Habar Yoonis, and Dhulbahante clans participated.

In July 2002, the Somaliland army deployed 450 troops in Yagori. The governor of Puntland's Sool region, who was in Las Anod at the time, condemned the move, saying it would split the Harti clan.

In 2005, elections were held in Somaliland, in Yagori town, which is controlled by the Somaliland Armed Forces, but even within Yagori district there were places where elections were not held.

In August 2016, President Silanyo visited Yagori.

In April 2019, a prison commander and a deputy commander of a police station of Somaliland were murdered in Yagori. In December 2021, a peace conference between Jaamac Siyaad and Ugaadhyahan, both branches of Dhulbahante, took place in Yagori. The Somaliland Minister of Interior was present at the conference.

In December 2021, a peace conference between the Jama Siyad and Ugadhyahan clans was held; Garad Jama Garad Ismail Duale declared the conference open.

In January 2022, the warring Jama Siyad and Mohamed Siyad clans agreed to a peace conference in Yagori.

In October 2022, the Somaliland Minister of Health visited Yagori to witness the opening of a new health facility.

In May 2023, SSC-Khatumo claimed to have occupied Yagori.

== Demographics ==
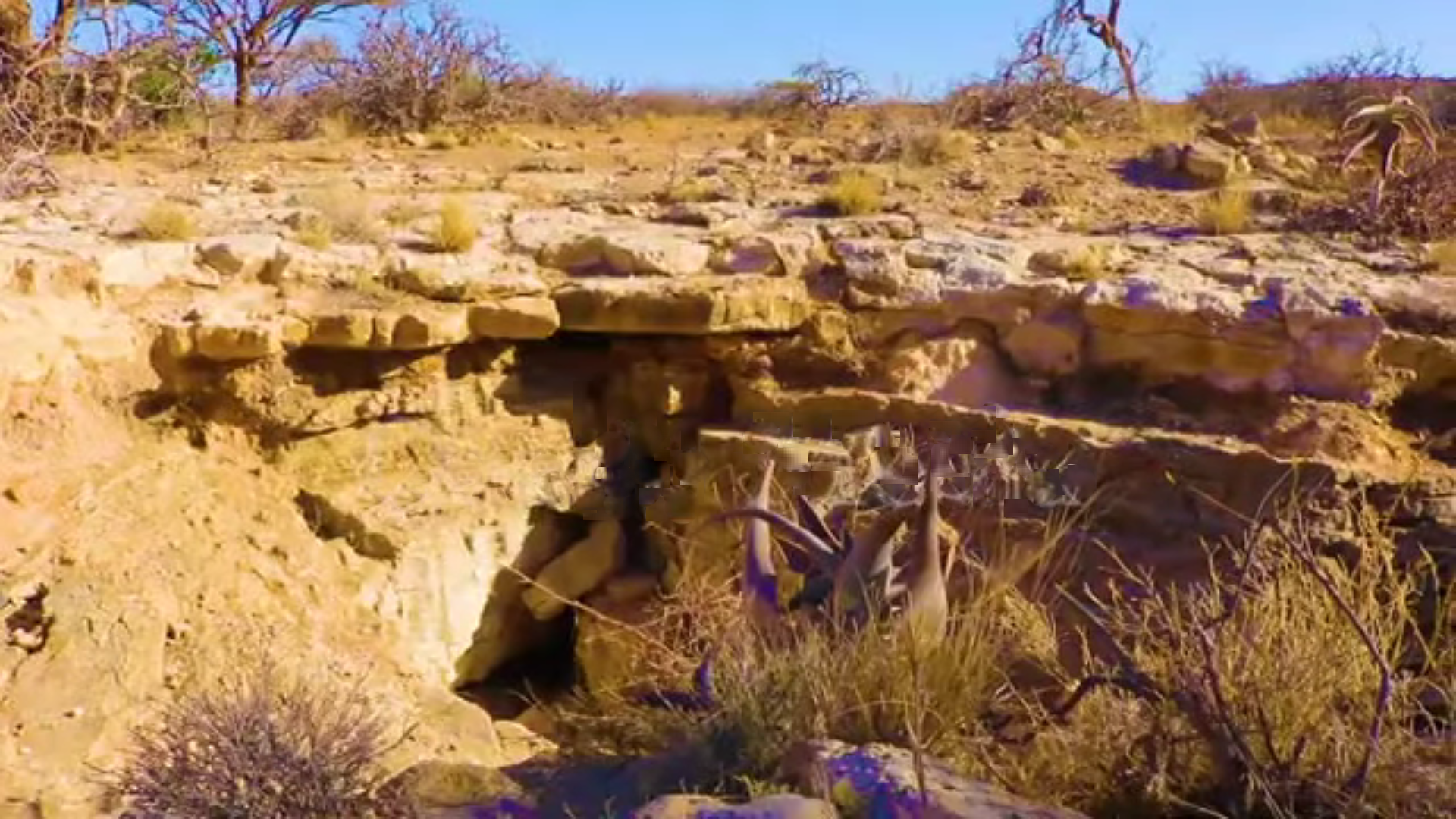
Afbakayle borehole held Eric Swayne-raided Jama Siad livestock on 30th May 1901

A book published in 1951 states that the clans that was grazing livestock in Yagori were Yesif, Adan Madoba, Idleh Farah of Habr Je'lo, and Yahia, Ahmed Gerad, Jama Siad, and rer Elmi of Dhulbahante.

The adjacent Afbakayle locals were raided by Eric Swayne and these were said to be Jama Siad livestock in 1901:

Hearings from prisoners that some encampments of the Jama Siad section of the Mahmud Gerad tribe were some 50 miles off, near Mayo, on the left of the line of advance to Yahelli, Swayne seized the opportunity and sent off the mounted corps under Major Beynon to surprise them ... at Samala on arrival at May 30th, when news was brought in that the mounted corps had succeeded in surprising the Jama Siad sections of the Mahmud Gerad and capturing some stock

— British War Office

The city is now primarily inhabited by the Jama Siad sub-clan, with the Reer Warsame well represented, as well as the Elmi Naleye "Reer Cilmi" sub-lineage of the Naleye Ahmed.

Yagori was during the colonial era a part of Nogal District, described by John Hunt as an "entirely Dolbahanta" district.

== See also ==
- Administrative divisions of Somaliland
- Regions of Somaliland
- Districts of Somaliland
- Somalia–Somaliland border
