= Governor of Sool =

Chief Executive of Sool

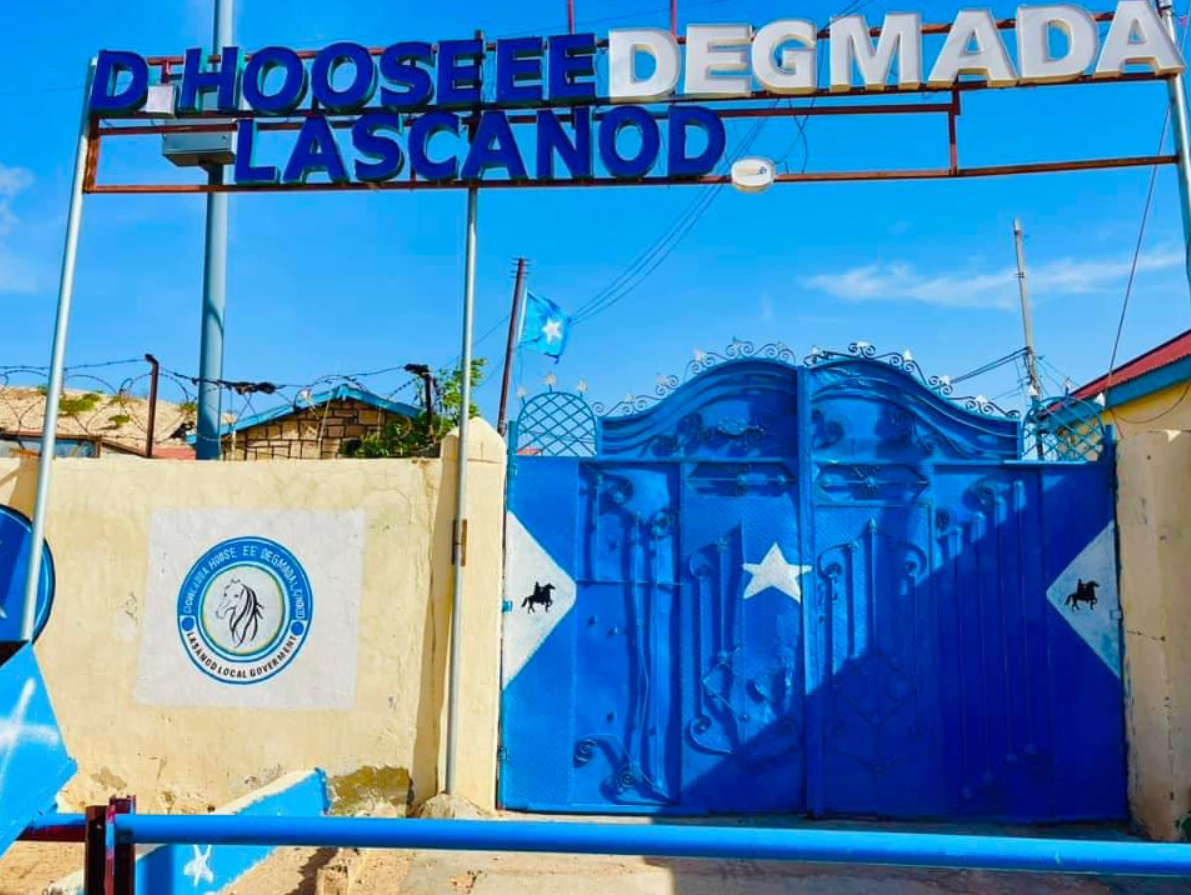
Governor of Sool office, Las Anod, SSC-Khatumo, Somalia

The Governor of Sool (Somali: Gudoomiyaha(or Guddoomiyaha, Badhasaabka) Gobolka Sool). Is the chief executive of the Sool, region of Somalia and leads the region's executive branch.

== Overview ==
Sool is claimed by both Somaliland and Puntland, with each government appointing a Governor of Sool. As of 2022, most of Sool is effectively controlled by Somaliland. Therefore, the authority of the Governor of Sool in Somaliland and the Governor of Sool in Puntland are quite different.

Somaliland, which declared its independence in 1991, claimed the entire area of former British Somaliland, including Sool. In 1998, Puntland declared itself a founding state and declared the inhabited area of Darod in northeastern Somalia as its territory, including Sool. Since then, the ownership of Sool has been ambiguous, but with Puntland's occupation of Sool's capital Las Anod in 2002, much of the area became under Puntland's effective control. However, the position was reversed when Somaliland occupied Las Anod in 2007. After losing Las Anod, Puntland was based in Tukaraq to its east. Then the Dhulbahante clan in Sool created the SSC in 2009 and the Khatumo State in 2012, declaring that it belongs neither to Somaliland nor Puntland. However, both were defeated in battles with Somaliland forces and agreed to merge with Somaliland in 2012 and in 2017. In 2018, Tukaraq and in 2022, Bo'ame were occupied by Somaliland forces from Puntland, most of Sool are effectively controlled by Somaliland. On August 4, 2022, A delegation led by the Governor of Sool Region of Somaliland, Abdikarin Aden Haji Diriye, who was escorted by a large number of military vehicles, reached Bo'ame town. However, Boame is not completely controlled by Somaliland, but Puntland troops are stationed on the outskirts.

From late 2022 into 2023, the Las Anod conflict escalated and the SSC-Khatumo movement emerged, after which control of Las Anod shifted away from Somaliland. In April 2025, regional media reported that Somalia’s federal government recognized SSC-Khatumo as an interim federal administration centered on Las Anod, a move criticized by Somaliland.

== Sool somaliland ==
Governor of Sool (Somaliland)
- Incumbent; Ahmed Farah Osman Abdi since 12 January 2025
- Appointer: President of Somaliland
- Formation: May 25, 1992

Governors of the regions is appointed to the office by the Somaliland president. The current governor of Sool is Ahmed Farah Osman Abdi.

Name	Somali name	Term of office		
Name	Somali name	Took office	Left office	Time in office
Ali Mohamed Sandulle	Cali Maxamuud Axmed "Sandule"	Feb. 2007	16 Dec. 2009	
Farah Askar Huseen	Faarax Askar Xuseen	16 Dec. 2009(Appointed on January 15 Nov. 2009)		
Abdullahi Jama	Cabdilaahi UJaamac Diiriye	13 Aug. 2010		
Mohamed Mahmud Ali "Jiin-yare"	Maxamed Maxamud Cali "Jeeni" or "Geelle"		5 Feb. 2013	
Mohamed Farah Aden	Maxamed Faarax Aden	5 Feb. 2013	7 Feb. 2015	2 years, 2 days
Yashin Mahamed Shide	Yaasiin Maxamed Shide "Yaasiin X"	7 Feb. 2015		
Ahmed Mohamed Daadey	Axmed Maxamed Daadey	1 Sep. 2015		
Mustaf Shiine	Mustafe Cabdi Ciise "Mustafe Shiine"		15 Aug. 2016	
Mahamud Ali Saleban	Maxamuud Cali Saleebaan "Ramaax"	15 Aug. 2016	04 Dec. 2016	111 days
Abdi Khayre Dirir	Cabdi Khayre Dirir	04 Dec. 2016	31 Jul. 2018	1 year, 239 days
Abdirashid Hussein Abdille Gargaar	Cabdirashiid Xuseen Cabdille "Gargaar"	31 Jul. 2018	31 Dec. 2018	153 days
Abdiqani Mohamoud Jidhe	Cabdiqani Maxamuud Jiidhe	31 Dec. 2018	1 Nov. 2021	2 years, 305 days
Abdikarim Adan Haji Diriye	Cabdikariin Aadan Xaaji Diiriye	1 Nov. 2021	12 Jan. 2025	3 years, 72 days
Ahmed Farah Osman Abdi	Axmed Faarax Cismaan	12 Jan. 2025	Incumbent	1 year, 238 days

== Puntland ==
Name	Somali name	Term of office		
Name	Somali name	Took office	Left office	Time in office
Ahmed Abdullahi Hassan				
Ibrahim Jama Daad	Ibraahim Jaamac Daad			
Ahmed Ibrahim Farah	Axmed Ibraahim Faarax "Faracade"			
Mukhtar Mahad Awad	Mukhtaar Mahad Cawad		Feb. 2017 (accidental death)	
Dahir Anshuur	Daahir Salaad Canshuur, Daahir Suleymaan Canshuur			
Abukar Abdi Gelle	Cabdiraxman Abuubakar Geelle, Abuubakar Cabdi Geelle	11 Jun. 2018	Oct. 2018	
(Vacant)		Oct. 2018	27 Apr. 2019	
Abdirizak Mahamed Warsame	Cabdirasaaq Maxamed Warsame "Gaagaale"	27 Apr. 2019		
Deni Jama Adan Haji Mahamud	Deni Jaamac Aadan Xaaji Maxamuud	22 Apr. 2021	Incumbent	5 years, 138 days

== See also ==
- Sool
- Politics of Somaliland
