= Garad Jama Garad Ali =

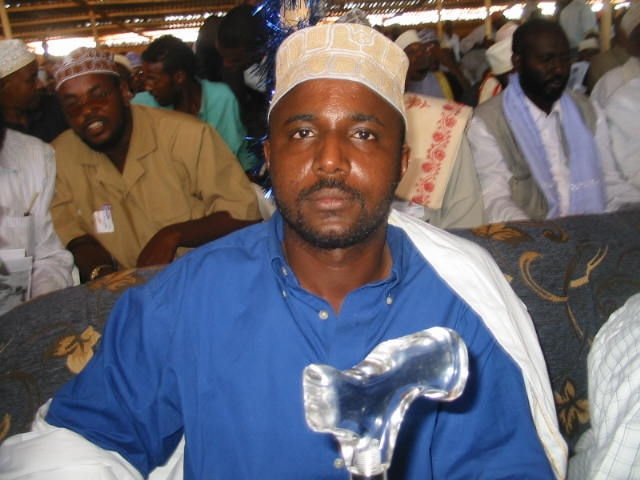

Garaad of the Dhulbahante
- Reign: 22 May 2006 - present
- Coronation: 22 May 2006
- Born: 1974 (age 51–52); Las Anod, Somalia
- Father: Garaad Cali

Garad Jama Garad Ali (Somali: Garaad Jamaac Garaad Cali) is the 21st supreme traditional clan Sultan (Garaad) of the Dhulbahante. He has significant influence in Somalia's current politics, particularly in Ssc-Khatumo.

== Biography ==
=== Birth ===
Jama was born in 1974 as the son of Garad Ali Garad Jama in the city of Las Anod, Sool region Republic of Somalia. He belongs to the Baharsame in Farah Garad in Dhulbahante clan. According to another source, he has Sahdheer as his hometown.

In 1985, his father Garad Ali died. At this time Jama was 11 years old, too young to assume the position of Garad, so the position was taken over by Garad Abdiqani Garad Jama, brother of Garad Ali.

Garad Jama's predecessor Garad, Garad Abdiqani Garad Jama, who led the Dhulbahante delegation in the Grand Conference in Burao in 1991 was first to table the case for secession, and was one of several signatories of the Somaliland Declaration of Independence on behalf of the Dhulbahante. Nonetheless, Garad Abdiqani was never fully convinced of Somaliland's secessionist endeavour due to Dhulbahante self interest, and later retracted his support when he participated in the foundation of Puntland in 1998.

On 9 February 2006, Garad Abdiqani Garad Jama died. In this section, he will be written Garad Jama.

=== The Coronation ===
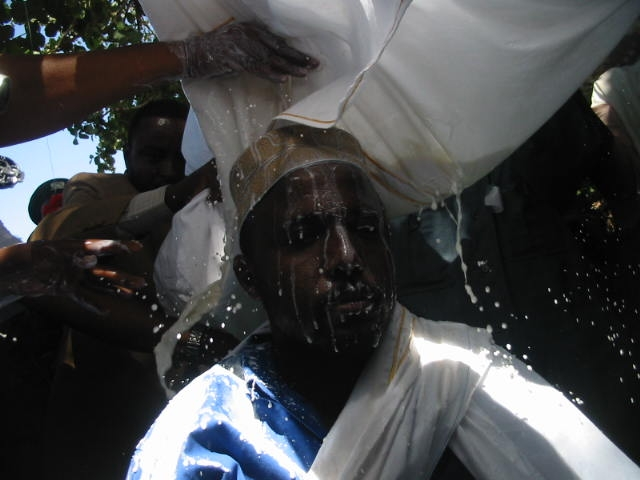

The coronation brought together, for the first time after the collapse of Somali Government in 1991, a large number of politically diverse politicians such as former Somali Prime Minister Ali Khalif Galaydh, the President and the Vice-President of Puntland.

It took place on May 22, 2006, in Geedo-Qarsay Valley, near Las Anod, where Garad Jama's father (Garad Ali aka Ali Garad Jama), his uncle (Garad Abdiqani Garad Jama), and his grandfather (Garad Jama) were crowned. The Las-Anoders showed their well-known hospitality to the thousands of guests who attended "the once of a lifetime" ceremony. The audiences were entertained with well-trained horses that were decorated by damasks and embroidery, which manifested the traditional craftsmen and women's hard work based on the rich Somali cultural heritage. At 10 o'clock the milk was poured onto the Garad. Milk is a symbol of peace and eternal prosperity; this act is true to the equilibrium of the virtues of the traditional culture.

Press outlets of varying degrees of conventionality have utilized the abbreviation SSCD (Sool, Sanaag, Cayn, Doollo) for Garad Jama.Since his coronation, the Garad is actively engaged in peace and reconciliation efforts in the northern Somali regions. He primarily participates and spearheads efforts to resolve conflicts in Somaliland, Puntland state of Somalia and the Somali Region of Ethiopia. The Garad also possess a huge political sway and plays an influential role in the social dynamics of the northern Somalis.

=== Somaliland ===
In 2007, Garad Jama visited Las Anod. However, the Somaliland forces occupied Las Anod. For the next 15 years, Garad Jama did not visit Las Anod. While Garad Jama is supportive of Somali unity, his predecessor, Garad Abdiqani Garad Jama, who led the Dhulbahante delegation in the Grand Conference in Burao in 1991 was first to table the case for secession, and was one of several signatories of the Somaliland Declaration of Independence on behalf of the Dhulbahante. Nonetheless, Garad Abdiqani Garad Jama was never fully convinced of Somaliland's secessionist endeavour, and later retracted his support when he participated in the foundation of Puntland in 1998.

In October 2009, Garad Jama met with the BBC after a meeting in Nairobi and demanded that the Somaliland army withdraw from Las Anod and Buuhoodle. However, Bashe Mohamed Farah, deputy speaker of the Somaliland parliament, refused.

In November 2010, Garad Jama met with Sharif Sheikh Ahmed, President of the Transitional Federal Government of Somalia, along with Suleiman Haglotosiye as part of a delegation from the SSC, President of the Transitional Federal Government of Somalia.

Garad Jama joined Dhulbahante's Khatumo State as a traditional leader, which began operating around 2012.

In August 2012, a meeting of the Khatumo State was held in Sahdheer, where Garad Jama lives, and Ali Khalif Galaydh was elected as the new president.

In November 2013, Garad Jama criticized the Puntland government for interfering with the Khatumo State and the Khatumo State Vice President for responding to a dialogue with the Puntland government with a Buuhoodle.

Around April 2014, when the Khatumo State began to decline, he was living in Sahdheer, not in the center of the Khatumo State, and had contact with Puntland.

In January 2015, Garad Jama attended the coronation of Garaad Abdirisaaq Garaad Soofe, brother of Garaad Abdulahi Garaad Soofe.

In June 2017, Garad Jama criticized President Ali Khalif Galaydh's policy of integrating Khatumo State into Somaliland.

=== After the end of Khatumo ===
In June 2019, Garad Jama visited Werder, Ethiopia and met with Mustafa Mohammed Omar.

In March 2020, Garad Jama visited Dharkayn Geenyo for the inauguration of Garad Mukhtar Garad Ali and stated that they do not belong to Somaliland or Puntland.

=== 2023 Las Anod conflict ===
On January 23, 2023, Garad Jama visited Las Anod for the first time in 15 years, where he was welcomed. Garad Jama said that the Somaliland government was cause of the chaos in Las Anod and killing civilians who was protesting peacefully in the city of Las Anod will no longer be controlled by Hargeisa.

On January 31, Garad Jama Garaad Ali accused the Somaliland troops of being the terrorists in response to Somaliland's president describing the forces disrupting Las Anod as terrorist. On February 6, 2023, the supreme of Dhulbahante, Garaad Jaamac Garaad Cali and other Dhulbahante clan elders declared their intent to form a state government named "SSC-Khatumo" within the Federal Government of Somalia. Somaliland troops attacked the city on the same day killing many people.

On February 8, Garad Jama Garad Ali, accused the Somaliland government of genocide, called for peace and declared Las Anod's intent to be governed from Mogadishu under the Federal Government of Somalia. Within the same week of February, fighting and civilian bombardments had killed at least 82 people in total and displaced 90% of the residents. The region had produced 185,000 internally displaced people and 60,000 refugees in February. On March 2, the mayor of Las Anod reported that Somaliland forces were bombing public buildings from the surrounding countryside including government institutions and hospitals. The UN also reported a casualty count of over 200 deaths.

On July 11, Somaliland troops were reported to have shelled a health facility in Las Anod, destroying 2 ambulances and causing dozens of casualties (including healthcare workers and patients). The World Health Organization published a press release condemning the attack on the facility and the shelling of hospitals. In response, the Somaliland Ministry of Foreign Affairs described the statement as "disturbing" and claimed that they were fighting clan militias and Al-Shabaab terrorists, to ensure "that those in need have access to these services and other humanitarian assistance".

On 16 August, Somali traditional poet Abwan Jama Kadiye died in an incident that generated significant attention and concern. Reports suggest that he was a victim of indiscriminate mortar shelling in the vicinity of Goja Adde. While there have been claims attributing this incident to Somaliland, Somaliland has denied any involvement in these allegations.

On August 25, the SSC administration overran two strongholds of the Somaliland National Army in Maraaga and Goja’adde, capturing numerous weapons and vehicles. A spokesperson for SSC-Khatumo stated that they achieved a significant victory on Friday by capturing all nearby Somaliland military outposts and seizing their war vehicles, weapons, and ammunition socks. During the battle, General Faisal Abdi Bootan was taken as a Prisoner of War and ssc-Khatumo military succeeded to drive away Somalilands army over 100km and secure the whole region. This significant victory brought peace to the Las anod and the cities of SSC-Khatumo. In december, Garaad jaamac garaad Ali and Dhulbahante elders stated that that Khatumo state is not part of Puntland, belonging neither to Somaliland nor Puntland.

== See also ==
- Garaad
- Garad Abdiqani Garad Jama
- Garad Saleban Garad MohamedLaascaanood
