= Sahdheer =

Saaxdheer Sahdeer
- Town
- Location in Somalia
- Coordinates: 8°0′10.63″N 47°6′26.24″E
- Country: Somalia
- Regional State: Khatumo
- Region: Sool
- District: Las Anod

Population (2007)
  - Total: 4,500
- Time zone: UTC+3 (EAT)

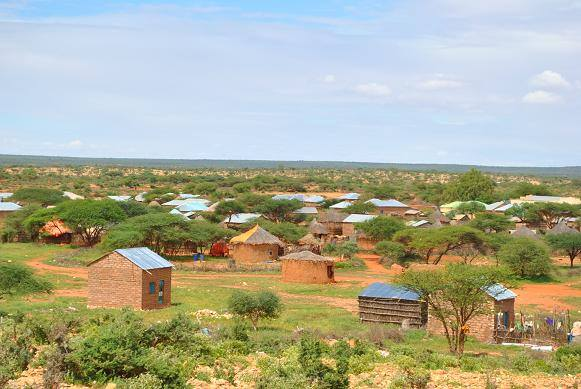
Houses in the valley of Sahdheer, Somalia

Sahdheer (Somali: Saaxdheer) is a town in northern Khatumo State region of Somalia.

== Overview ==
Saaxdheer is on the border with Ethiopia. The town lies in the Sahader Valley, due south of Las Anod. Sahdheer lies a few miles northwest of Gumburka Cagaare, the site of the greatest Darwiish victory over a joint Abyssinian-British force. The British force consisted of men from nine different regions of the world:

Within the encampment there was a strange medley of men drawn from many different corners of the Empire: From the British Isles, from South Africa, from Frontier of India, from Kenya, from the Nile, from the uplands of Central Africa, Boers and Sikhs and Sudanese: Their race had battled against the Empire not so many years before, but had since found contentment and prosperity under British rule.

In August 2014, Somaliland troops marched into Sahdheer engaged pro-Khatumo State militias in battles that killed at least 10 people. United States Special Representative for Somalia James P. McAnulty and others jointly expressed concern over the deployment of troops to Sahdheer.

In June 2015, the President of Khatumo State, Ali Khalif Galaydh, moved his address from Buuhoodle to Sahdheer. Still, in August, he moved his address to Balli Ad in Togdheer due to the approach of the Somaliland army on the outskirts of the town and protests from residents.

Fighting between local clans in Dhummay, Sool, October 2018. Dhummay elders blamed the Somaliland government for allowing the militia the opportunity to attack because the Somaliland army in Dhummay was moved to Sahdheer.

In August 2020, a mediation meeting was held in Sahdheer due to fighting between Dhulbahante clans (Ararsame and Hayaag) in Horufadhi.

In May 2021, Jaamac Faarax Xasan, Minister of Health for Puntland, visits Sahdheer. Welcomed by clan chief, Garad Jama Garad Ali.

In January 2022, Somaliland's Ministry of Water Resources Development revived a well in the Sahdheer region.

== Demographics ==
The town's main inhabitants are Dhulbahante branch of the Darod, with the Bahararsame sub-clan of the Farah Garad branch well represented.

== See also ==
- Administrative divisions of Somalila
- Regions of Somalia
- Districts of Somalila
- Somalia
