= Abdirahman Mohamed Abdi Hashi =

Somalian politician

Dr. Abdirahman Mohamed Abdi Hashi Dr. Cabdiraxmaan Maxamed Cabdi Xaashi د. عبدالرحمن محمد عبدي حاشي

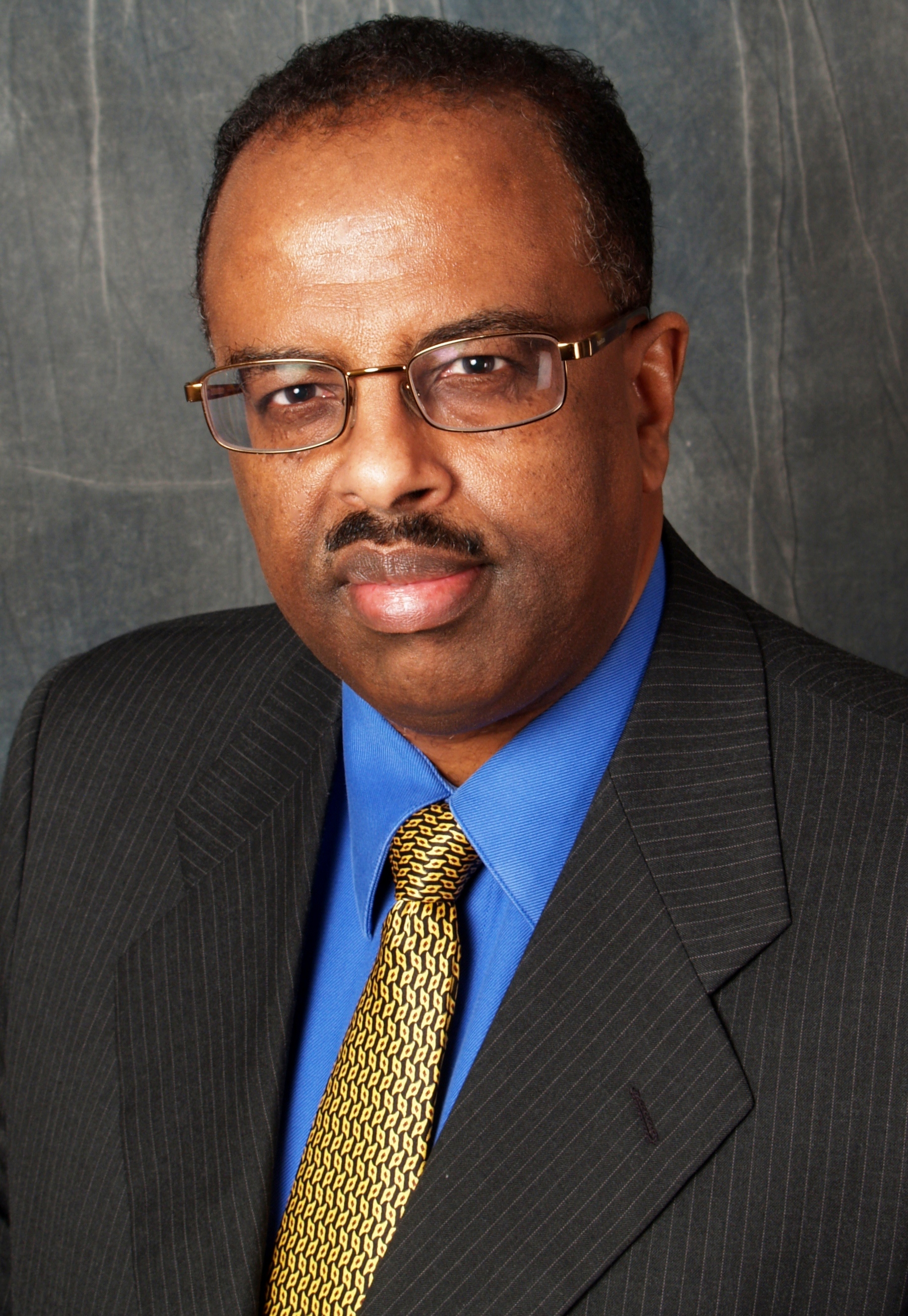
- In office 2017–2018
- President: Mohamed Abdullahi Mohamed
- Prime Minister: Hassan Ali Khaire

Personal details
- Born: 23 September 1955 Sheikh, Somalia
- Party: Badbaado Qaran
- Education: George Mason University and Johns Hopkins University and Pace University
- Occupation: Economist

Abdirahman Mohamed Abdi Hashi (Somali: Cabdiraxmaan Maxamed Cabdi Xaashi, Arabic: د. عبدالرحمن محمد عبدي حاشي), is a Somali politician, economist, and former minister of fisheries and blue economy in the Federal Government of Somalia. Hashi is the son of co-founder and the former president of Puntland Mohamed Abdi Hashi.

== Career ==
Hashi is an economist by profession, and a financial expert with nearly thirty years of experience working in Wall Street and the World Bank. Dr. Abdirahman was a candidate for the president of Somalia in 2012. He has two master's degrees from Johns Hopkins University and attended George Mason University and received his PhD in economics. Dr. Abdirahman Mohamed Abdi Hashi is the author of the book Islamic Banking: Steady in Shaky Times, which explores the resilience of Islamic banking during financial crises.

== Personal life ==
Hashi hails from the Qayaad tribe of Dhulbahante, a sub-clan of the Darod.
