= Balli Ad =

Balicad وضوود
- Town
- Location in Somalia
- Coordinates: 8°05′11.7″N 46°45′00.8″E
- Country: Somalia
- Regional State: Khatumo
- District: Buuhoodle
- Time zone: UTC+3 (EAT)

Balicad is a town in Buhoodle District of Togdheer region in Somalia.

Presently, the SSC-Khaatumo administration controls Balli Ad.

== History ==
In August 2015, Khatumo State President Ali Khalif Galaydh moved his base from Sahdheer to Balli Ad after being pursued by Somaliland forces. In September, Khatumo State held a council meeting in Balli Ad, but some of the traditional elders in Sool refused to attend.

In January 2016, Somaliland forces occupied Balli Ad from Khatumo State. The Somaliland government said, "The Somalia government incited violence in this region, which is Somaliland territory. The deployment of troops is to bring peace and stability to the region."

In July 2016, Clan chief Garaad Abshir Saalax, who died in Sweden, was brought to Balli Ad for burial.

In July 2017, Khatumo State were merged to Somaliland, and the Khatumo forces stationed in Balli Ad were integrated with the Somaliland forces. In February 2018, 200 soldiers and 5 armored vehicles were handed over from the Khatumo army to the Somaliland army in Balli Ad.

== Demographics ==
The main inhabitants belong to the Guuleed Garaad (Barkad) branch of the Dhulbahante clan.
