= The Pinnacle (Nairobi) =

Skyscraper under construction in Nairobi

- Interactive map of The Pinnacle
- Alternative names: Pinnacle Towers
- Hotel chain: Hilton

General information
- Status: On hold
- Type: Mixed Use Commercial
- Location: Upper Hill, Nairobi, Kenya
- Coordinates: 01°17′48″S 36°49′05″E
- Groundbreaking: 23 May 2017
- Estimated completion: 2029
- Cost: Sh20 billion (Est)

Height
- Architectural: 1,050 feet (320 m)
- Top floor: 1,000 feet (300 m)
- Observatory: 916 feet (279 m)

Technical details
- Floor count: 70
- Grounds: 2.5 acres (1.0 ha)

Design and construction
- Architecture firm: Archgroup Consultants
- Developer: White Lotus Group / Jabavu Village
- Engineer: Meinhardt
- Quantity surveyor: BECS Consultancy
- Main contractor: China State Construction Engineering Corporation

Other information
- Number of rooms: 257

Website
- www.thepinnacleofafrica.com

The Pinnacle, also known as Pinnacle Towers, is a skyscraper currently on hold in Nairobi, the capital and the largest city of Kenya. When completed, the skyscraper is expected to become the second-tallest building in Africa after Egypt's Iconic Tower, and the third tallest building in the Southern Hemisphere, at 70 stories and 1,050 feet (320 m) in height.

== Location ==
The skyscraper is located in Upper Hill, on a 2.5 acres (10,000 m^{2}) piece of property, approximately 4 kilometres (2 mi), south-west of the city centre of Nairobi, the capital city of Kenya.

== Overview ==
The development consists of two adjacent towers. The shorter tower, at 45 floors will house the 257-room, five-star Upper Hill Hilton Hotel, the third Hilton franchise in Nairobi and the 50th on the African continent. The taller tower, with 70 floors, will feature eleven floors of commercial office space, nine floors of upscale rental retail space, and 46 floors with 210 upscale 1, 2 and 3-bedroom, serviced residential apartments. Other amenities include conference facilities, a gymnasium, luxury spa and an infinity pool. The taller tower will have a rooftop helipad, to allow chopper directly from/to Jomo Kenyatta International Airport, 16 kilometres (10 mi) away.

== Ownership ==
The development is a joint venture by Hass Petroleum an East African petroleum products distributor and the White Lotus Group, a Dubai-based investment firm.

== Construction and funding ==
The budgeted construction cost for the Pinnacle Towers is US$200 million. Of that, the developers contributed US$50 million and the balance was borrowed, from Afreximbank and some Kenyan banks. The main contractor is China State Construction Engineering Corporation (CSCEC). Commissioning of the building is expected in 2020.

== Delays and land ownership dispute ==
A dispute has arisen over ownership of part of the land being used for construction. The High Court has issued arrest warrants for the directors of White Lotus Projects, Poosapati Ramachandra Raju Sita and Mohamud Mahat Noor. The dispute began when legal action was taken against Hass Petroleum by Ugandan tycoon James Mugoya and a trust formed by former United Arab Emirates leader Sheikh Zayed Bin Sultan Al Nahyan.

== See also ==
- List of tallest buildings in Kenya
