= Dharkayn Geenyo =

Dharkayn Geenyo عدي عديي
- Town
- Location in Somalia
- Coordinates: 8.0055°N 46.9939°E
- Country: Somalia

Population (2019)
  - Total: 4,000
- Time zone: UTC+3 (EAT)

Dharkayn Geenyo (Dharkayngeenyo, Darkeyn Genyo) is a town in the southern Sool region of Waqooyi Bari / North East State of Somalia.

== Overview ==
It is located on the Doawlad Goboleedka Waqooyi Bari-Ethiopia border. Dharkayn Geenyo is a historical town, it was an important border post during the Siad Barre government period with one of the biggest Somali military bases. The town was the centre of clan skirmishes in 2016 and 2017.

Presently, the Doawlad Goboleedka Waqooyi Bari holds control over Darkayn Geenyo and was recently visited by a delegation led by President Abdikhadir Ahmed Aw-Ali on December 16, 2023.

== Demographics ==
The town is primarily settled by the Dhulbahante clan, with the Abdi Garad sub-clan being well represented. In 2020, the Garad of the Abdi Garad-Qayad clan, Garaad Mukhtaar Garaad Cali Buraale was crowned in the town by the Garaad of the Dhulbahante, Garad Jama Garad Ali.

== Mayor ==
- Siciid Warsame Cabdi

== History ==
=== Contemporary ===
In the 1920s this area was named Dharkayn.

In a book published in England in 1951, Dharkayn Geenyo is listed under the name Darkein Genyo.

In January 1982, an officer relative of President Barre was murdered in Dharkayn Geenyo.

In July 1999, Garad Ali Burale Xasan Gaba'aweyte was installed as the new Garad (chief) of the Qayaad clan in Dharkayn Geenyo.

In October 2010, Qayaad chief Garad Ali Burale held a clan meeting in Dharkayn Geenyo to discuss the relationship with Somaliland and other issues.

In 2014, the clan conflict was rekindled in Dharkayn Geenyo, when the Khatumo State's military killed a militia member of the Qayaad clan. The conflict is said to have been agitated by the diaspora, which provided supplies and other support. It is also said that the intervention of the Puntland government, which tried to use the incident for political purposes, made the situation worse. In August 2015, a preliminary agreement was reached in settlement talks between the clans.

In April 2016, a clan struggle erupted again in Dharkayn Geenyo, killing 10 people. The Sool state government, at the behest of the Somaliland government, intervened in this struggle. The cause was an incident six months earlier in which 15 people were seriously injured when a settlement fell apart. In June, another clan war broke out, killing more than 20 people. The Somaliland government dispatched troops. Because of this incident, most of the inhabitants of Dharkayn Geenyo were evacuated to Las Anod. In July, the death toll stood at 52, and the Somaliland president called representatives of the Dharkayn Geenyo and Dhumay clans to the presidential palace to review the situation.

In November 2016, one person was injured in a dispute between the two clans in neighboring Las Anod, but the town of Dharkayn Geenyo remained peaceful.

In April 2017, a delegation from the Somaliland government visited Dharkayn Geenyo and met with Qayaad chief Gaaad Ali Burale and others.

In February 2018, Qayaad chief Garad Ali Burale died in Las Anod.

In March 2020, Garad Mukhtar Garad Ali Burale inaugurated the new Garad of the Qayaad clan in Dharkayn Geenyo. In conjunction with this, Somaliland's Minister of Information and Culture visited Dharkayn Geenyo for the groundbreaking ceremony of a $500,000 well. Also, one of the Dhulbahante clan elders garad mukhtaar garad Ali garad Buraale stated at this inauguration ceremony that Dharkayn Geenyo is not part of SSC Khaatumo STATE. Also present at the inauguration were elders from the Puntland-dominated region.

=== SSC-Khatumo control ===
In November 2020, a mine exploded in a village near Dharkayn Geenyo, killing three pastoralists. They are mines from the former Somalia- SSC khaatumo war and are sometimes exposed during the rainy season.

On the 22nd of March 2025, a delegation from the SSC-Khatumo administration led by officer Cabdisahal, including a minister of security, minister of inner affairs, and the Khatumo governor of Sool province, and the general of SSC-Khatumo established administrative duties in Dharkayn Geenyo.
