= Dabataag =

Dabataag عدي عديي
- Town
- Dabataag
- Location in Somalia
- Coordinates: 8°19′53.51″N 47°3′48.46″E
- Country: Somalia
- Regional State: Khatumo
- District: Las Anod

Population (2019)
  - Total: 960
- Time zone: UTC+3 (EAT)

Dabataag is a town in the southern Sool region of Somalia. It is about 40 miles south of Las Anod, the regional capital of Sool.

Presently, the SSC-Khaatumo administration holds control over Dabataag and was recently visited by a delegation led by President Abdikhadir Ahmed Aw-Ali on December 16, 2023.
