= MOD Alliance =

The MOD alliance is a still extant political alliance in Somalia that once dominated the state apparatus. It consists of the Marehan, Ogaden and Dhulbahante clans which formed the backbone of the former military regime of Siad Barre, and which the dictator increasingly depended on throughout his rule. It revolved around the clans of his (Marehan), (Ogadeni), and (Dulbahante). Despite Barre's initial anti-clannism rhetoric, this cabal of clans who supported the Somalian regime where extended families of the president. All three sub-clans form part of the major Somali Darod family consisting of many more other sub-clans, which however were excluded from this alliance constituted by Siad Barre. Marehan had the majority, Ogaden had the leopard's share and Dhulbahante had the hyena's share.
