= Ali Jangali =

Somali politician

Ali Jangali علي أحمد جامع
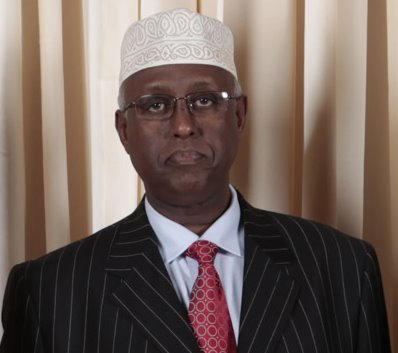

Minister of Air Transport and Aviation
- In office 27 January 2015 – 29 March 2017
- President: Hassan Sheikh Mohamud
- Prime Minister: Omar Abdirashid Ali Sharmarke
- Succeeded by: Mohamed Abdullahi Salad

Personal details
- Born: Somalia
- Party: Independent

Ali Jangali (Somali: Cali Axmed Jamaac, Arabic: علي أحمد جامع) is a Somali politician.

== Personal life ==
Ali belongs to the Axmed Garaad subclan of the Dhulbahante.

== Career ==
Between 2004 and 2012, Jama held various positions in

1. Transitional Federal Government of Somalia. Among these portfolios were Minister of Foreign Affairs and International Cooperation, as well as Information Minister.

He is the former Minister of Air Transport and Aviation the Federal Government of Somalia, having been appointed to the position on 27 January 2015 by the now former Prime Minister Omar Abdirashid Ali Sharmarke. Currently serving as a member or parliament.
