= SSC (militia) =

2009-2012 Somali unionist group in northern Somalia

HMB-SSC
- Hoggaanka Badbaadinta iyo Mideynta SSC
- Leaders: Suleiman Haglotosiye and Ali Sabarey
- Group: Dhulbahante
- Headquarters: Buuhoodle and Dharkayn Geenyo (de facto)
- Ideology: Political union with Somalia
- Status: Active
- Wars: Kalshaale conflict

SSC, HMB-SSC or the Unity and Salvation Authority of the SSC regions of Somalia (Somali: Haggaanka Mideynta iyo Badbaadinta Gobolada SSC ee Soomalia) or HBM-SSC (Somali: Hoggaanka Badbaadada iyo Mideynta SSC) was the name of the self-proclaimed autonomous government of the Dhulbahante clan living between Somaliland and Puntland, which was active from 2009 to around 2012. It claimed possession of the so-called SSC regions of Sool (S), Sanaag (S), and Cayn (C).

Initially, the HBM-SSC's goal was to become a constituent state of the Federal Republic of Somalia with the support of the foreign diaspora. Still, it was not recognized by both neighboring Somaliland and Puntland, and through fighting with Somaliland, it became a mere militia organization. It also lost support from the Dhulbahante clan. And ended its activities when the president of the HBM-SSC joined the Somaliland government. It is sometimes referred to as the SSC militia because it was a de facto militia organization except in the early stages of its activities. The subsequent campaign to gain autonomy for the Dhulbahante clan was conducted by a newly created organization, the Khatumo State.

== History ==
=== Background ===
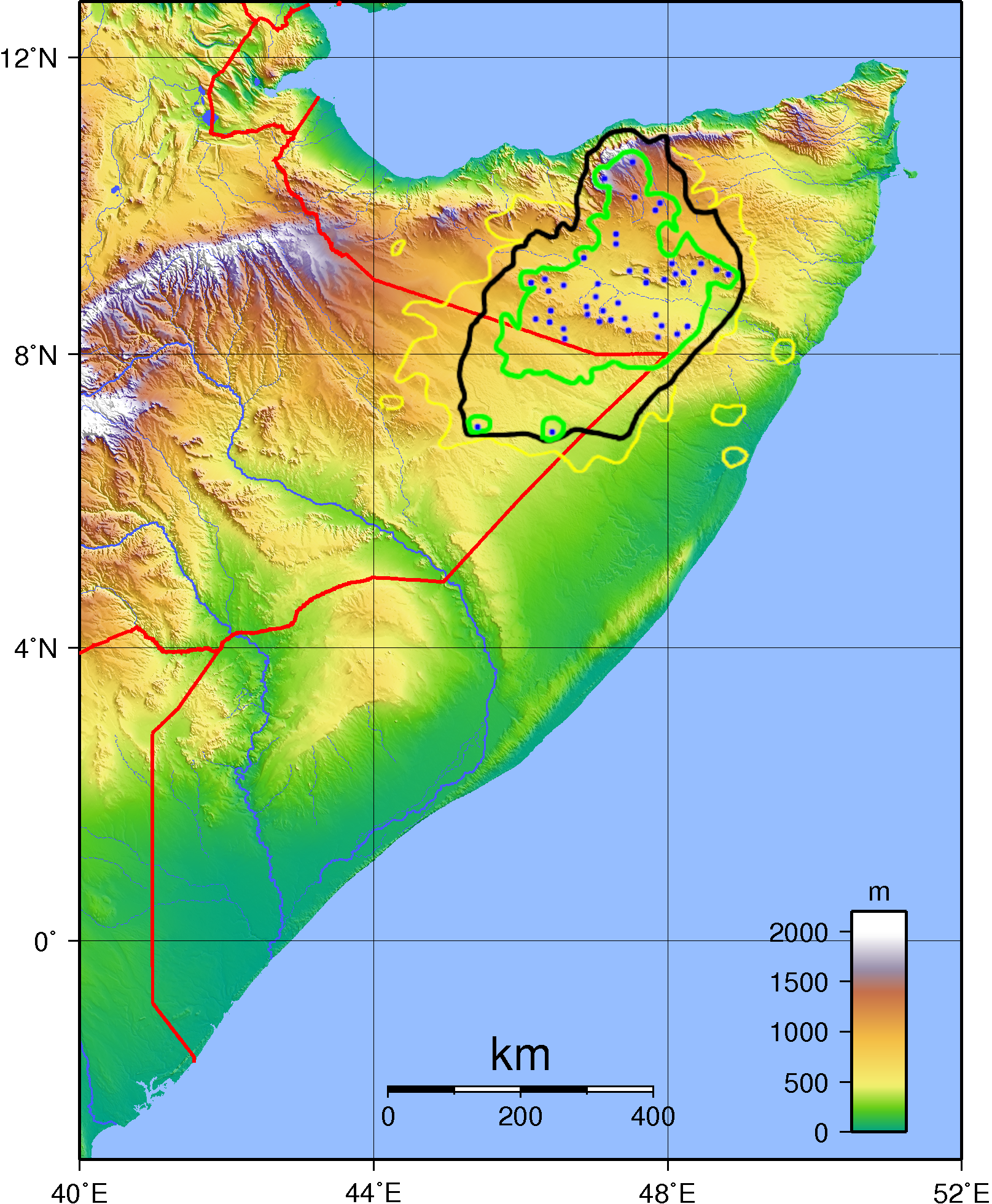
Life range of the Dhulbahante clan in the 1940s. The green frames and blue dots are the home wells, the black frame is the normal area of activity, and the yellow frames are the places where the existence was confirmed.

The Dhulbahante clan inhabits parts of Sool, parts of Sanaag and Cayn. These areas belonged to British Somaliland until Somalia's independence and were positioned as a British protectorate. British Somaliland was based on an agreement between Britain and several clan chiefs in northwestern Somalia. However, the Dhulbahante clan was not a signatory to this agreement with the British and had its autonomous system.

British Somaliland became independent as the State of Somaliland on June 26, 1960, and merged with Italian Trust Territory of Somaliland on July 1 to become the Republic of Somalia. Somalia became a dictatorship in a coup d'état in 1969 and became a state of civil war around 1988.

In 1991, Somaliland declared independence and claimed the entire former British Somaliland as its territory; in 1998, Puntland declared its formation and claimed the whole Darood clan-inhabited area in northeastern Somalia, including the Dhulbahante clan, as its territory. As a result, the SSC region was claimed as territory by Somaliland and Puntland. In addition, the Transitional Federal Government of Somalia was established in 2004 to reunify Somalia, but the Somaliland government did not participate in the process.

On the other hand, until the first half of 2009, there was no clear move for independence for the Dhulbahante clan. Rather, there was more Dhulbahante who do not support either Somaliland or Puntland.

=== Establishment ===
In the first half of 2009, a meeting was held by the Dhulbahante clan to establish a regional government directly under the Federal Republic of Somalia, including residents of Sool regions such as Buuhoodle, Las Anod, and Taleh, as well as the diaspora in Nairobi, Kenya. Proposals for the name of the regional government included Dervishland.

In October 2009, in Nairobi, Kenya, the Dhulbahante clans of northern Somalia and the diaspora outside Somalia came together to form the "Unity and Relief Agency for the SSC Regions of Somalia" (Haggaanka Mideynta iyo Badbaadinta Gobolada SSC ee Soomalia or Haggaanka Badbaadinta iyo Mideynta SSC) was established. The SSC is a combination of Sool, Sanaag, and Cayn, the settlements of the Dhulbahante clan.

The President of the HBM-SSC is the entrepreneur Suleiman Haglotosiye, and the vice president is Cali Xasan 'Saberi,' The goals of the HBM-SSC were to end the occupation of the SSC region by the Somaliland army, to gain international recognition for its activities, and to promote the interests of the local population. The President's term of office was set at two and a half years until mid-April 2012. And the HBM-SSC also had a parliament, whose role was to approve the budget and review government activities, and which was empowered to dismiss the President. Apart from the parliament, the traditional authorities were given the role of conflict mediation. And the members of the parliament were to be selected by the traditional leaders and must include a woman.

The government organization members were to be equally allocated to the leading clans of Dhulbahante, namely Farah Garad, Mohamoud Garad, and Baho Nugaaled.

=== Executive authority ===
The official capital was designated as Las Anod, but due to the effective control of Somaliland, Dharkayn Geenyo, near the Ethiopian border, became the provisional capital. Dharkayn Geenyo was home to many of the Baharsame clan (Farah Garad) and the Qayaad clan (independent). Buuhoodle was made the second capital. Many Farah Garad clans were living in Buuhoodle. In other words, the area of activity was centred on the Farah Garad clan residential area.

=== Initial configuration ===
- Government
  - President - Suleiman Haglotosiye (Farah Garad) U.S. citizen. A medical professional from Columbus, Ohio,
  - Vice President - Cali Xasan 'Saberi' (Ali Hassan Ahmed "Sabarey") (Mohamud Garad) Canadian citizen
  - Minister of Foreign Affairs - Maxamuud Cali Jaamac (Mohamed Garad)
  - Minister of Defense - Yasin 'Tamaat' (Mohammed Garad)
  - Minister of Interior
  - Minister of Information
  - Minister of Social Affairs
  - Minister of Finance
- Parliament Capacity of 21 membersSome live outside Somalia
  - Farah Garad 7 people.
  - Mohamud Garad 7 people
  - Baho Nugaaled 7 people.
- Traditional leaders
  - Garad Jama Garad Ali (Farah Garad)
  - Garaad Jaamac Garaad Ismaacii (Mohammed Garad)
  - Garaad Cali Buraale (Qayaad)

Note that some traditional leaders of the Dhulbahante who did not participate in the HBM-SSC.

- Garad Saleban Garad Mohamed (representative of Mohammed Garad)
- Garaad Abdulahi Garaad Soofe (Farah Garad)

The initial effective territory was between Las Anod and Buuhoodle, excluding Las Anod. However, the nominal territory was extended west to eastern Burao and north to northern Erigavo.

=== Surrounding Reactions ===
Both Somaliland and Puntland, the "neighboring countries" of the HMB-SSC, strongly opposed the independence of the SSC.

The relationship between the SSC and Ethiopia is unclear. Senior SSC officials and Ethiopian government officials and military officers met frequently in Buuhoodle, and it is assumed that the Ethiopian government tolerated the SSC.

Although the HBM-SSC claimed to be supported by the entire Dhulbahante, it was predominantly a Farah Garad branch and regionally predominantly in the southwestern part of the SSC area. Also, the SSC initially had no source of income. This made it difficult to provide administrative services to the locals and strengthen the military.

=== Battle with Somaliland ===
Relation map. a. Kalshale, b. Hagoogane, c. Widhwidh, d. Kalabaydh, e. Dharkayn Geenyo

In January 2010, the Somaliland military arrested and placed under house arrest 12 Dhulbahante elders who were holding a meeting in Holhol, north of Las Anod. The conference was organized by Dhulbahante chief Garad Jama Garad Ali, who fled in a car. The charge was that Garad Jama Garad Ali was the mastermind of the attack on the Somaliland army.

In March 2010, a meeting between Dhulbahante elders and the President of Puntland and others was held in Garowe, the capital of Puntland, and it was reported that nine elders signed a document confirming that the territory of the SSC is Puntland territory. The report stated that the meeting was with "elders of the SSC," but it did not include the principal members of the SSC.

- Garad Suleiman Mohamed
- Garad Abdulahi Sofe
- Garad Abshir Salah
- Garad Mohamud Osman Mashqare
- Garad Suleiman Burale Au-Adan
- Ugas Farah Mohamud Ali
- King Abdulahi Ahmed Ali
- Garaad Ali Burale Hasan
- Sultan Sayid Osman Ali

Garad, Ugas, King, Garaad, and Sultan all mean the chief of a clan.

In May 2010, the first fighting between SSC militias and the Somaliland army broke out in southern Widhwidh. Fighting continued intermittently until July, spilling over into the Kalabaydh.

In June 2010, Somaliland's Minister of Foreign Affairs described HBM-SSC leader Suleiman Haglotosiye as a "terrorist" in an interview with the BBC, explaining that he was responsible for the violent actions of Buuhoodle and Widhwidh.

By September 2010, the situation had calmed down, and more than 90% of the hundreds of families who had been evacuated from Widhwidh were back in town.

In November 2010, a delegation including the President of the HBM-SSC and the Minister of Defense visited the Transitional Federal Government of Somalia (TFG) in the Somalia capital Mogadishu and met with President Sharif Sheikh Ahmed and Prime Minister Mohamed Abdullahi Mohamed, among others. Puntland condemned the TFG for this move.

In November 2010, Ahmed Mohamed Mohamoud Silanyo, who became the President of Somaliland, sent a 10-member delegation to Widhwidh, one of the strongholds of the HBM-SSC. The board met with local elder Garaad Abshir Saalax, and Somaliland promised to release prisoners of war and compensate civilian deaths, while Garaad Abshir Saalax promised to set up a Somaliland regional government, prevent militia activities, and establish a Somaliland police and army by the Dhulbahante clan. However, Garaad Abshir Saalax later emigrated to Sweden and effectively reneged on the agreement with Somaliland because of his own people's support for Puntland.

In November 2010, shortly after the meeting between the Somaliland delegation and Garaad Abshir Saalax, a conflict broke out in Kalshale between the Habr Je'lo, a branch of the Isaaq clan, and the Dhulbahante clan. The main reason for the conflict was that the Dhulbahante considered the construction of a permanent water storage facility by the Habr Je'lo to expansiond their territory on Kalshale, and that had been used jointly by the Habr Je'lo and the Dhulbahante. The Kalshale dispute was initially resolved through discussions among the elders, but there happened to be an incident where a man from the Habr Je'lo clan shot and killed a man from the Dhulbahante. Later, a group of Dhulbahante attacked Habr Je'lo, killing seven members of the Habr Je'lo clan and three members of the Dhulbahante clan. The Somaliland government sent troops and religious leaders between the two clans to settle the dispute and proposed arbitration based on Islamic law. However, the Dhulbahante clan rejected the arbitration proposal.

In January 2011, President Silanyo of Somaliland declared that the Somaliland army would take control of Kalshale. Still, the local Dhulbahante clan joined forces with the SSC militia to oppose them and clashed in Hagoogane on January 31. The fighting displaced more than 3,000 residents of Hagoogane, and on February 7, clashes in Kalshale killed dozens of people. The fighting continued until mid-February. When the Somaliland government ordered Habr Je'lo to destroy the water storage facilities that had been the source of the conflict and offered a new arbitration plan, but the local Dhulbahante clan rejected it as well, leading to continued conflict between Somaliland and the local Dhulbahante.

In April 2011, a 15-year-old girl from the Las Anod neighborhood complained that she was questioned, shot (but not hit), and beaten by the Somaliland army.

=== Collapse of SSC and establishment of Khatumo State ===
In early June 2011, Somaliland Press reported that "in the last several months the TFG has been arming SSC militias in an attempt to create a conflict between Somaliland and Puntland in a mini-proxy war of its own."

On June 20, 2011, the Somaliland police arrested ten people for the attack on the Las Anod police station. The arrested individuals are allegedly linked to the SSC militia.

On June 26, 2011, Abdirisak Hassan Ismail signed a ceasefire agreement regarding the HBM-SSC representative in Widhwidh. However, on the following day, 27th, the Somaliland army base was attacked by a local militia, and the leader of HBM-SSC announced that they would continue fighting until Somaliland army withdrew from SSC area. This is seen as a division of the HBM-SSC.

A July 2011 United Nations Security Council report described the SSC militia as "can be characterized as an opportunistic and arguably mercenary militia force that has successfully appropriated legitimate local grievances and exploited radical diaspora sentiment for its own political and financial gain. "

In September 2011, as the HBM-SSC had become a Farah Garad-dominated organization and was considered unable to achieve its original objectives, a delegation of Dhulbahante intellectuals toured the Dhulbahante-inhabited areas of Sool, Sanaag, and Cayn. In January 2012, a resolution was passed in Talah to create a separate organization called the Khatumo State. Which effectively shut down the HBM-SSC. The date of the cessation of activities is not clear, but some documents put it in 2011.

A January 2012 UNPO report described the SSC militia as "militant accused of having ties with Al-Shabaab."

On February 7, 2012, Somaliland troops launched an offensive against Buuhoodle, killing at least three people in this February attack after more than 80 people had been killed in fighting through January.

In June 2012, HBM-SSC President Saleban Hagglothsier met with Somaliland President Silanyo in Dubai and agreed to disarm the militias and hand over weapons to the Somaliland government, with Somaliland providing public services.
