= James Isabirye Mugoya =

Ugandan engineer and businessman

- Born: 1950 (age 75–76); Uganda
- Other name: James Isabirye or James Mugoya
- Education: Nairobi University (Bachelor of Science in Civil Engineering)
- Occupation: Businessman
- Years active: 1975 — present
- Known for: Construction and being one of the wealthiest Ugandans
- Title: Managing director and chief executive officer Mugoya Construction Limited

James Isabirye Mugoya, also known as James Isabirye or James Mugoya, is a Ugandan engineer and businessman. He is the founder, owner and chief executive officer of Mugoya Construction Company Limited. In 2012, he was listed as one of the wealthiest individuals in Uganda.

== Early life and education ==
Mugoya was born in the Eastern Region of Uganda, circa 1950. He attended King's College Budo before entering Nairobi University, where he obtained a Bachelor of Science degree in civil engineering.

== Career ==
While at university in Nairobi in the 1970s, Mugoya became friends with one of President Daniel Arap Moi's sons. Following graduation, he started Mugoya Construction and Engineering Company Limited. According to print media in both Kenya and Uganda, Mugoya's business was awarded a series of lucrative government and private sector contracts during this period. He became very wealthy.

Following the changes of government in Kenya, where Mugoya's company was established and where the majority of business was located, contracts began to dwindle and Mugoya made plans to relocate to Uganda. Meanwhile, in Uganda, the Nsimbe Estate joint venture that he had started with the National Social Security Fund (Uganda), was ruled illegal by Ugandan authorities and was scuttled.
