= Ibraahim Guure =

Somali politician

Minister of Finance
- In office 2012–2014

Personal details
- Born: Buuhoodle, Somalia

Ibraahim Guure, or simply Guure, is a Somali lawmaker and former deputy minister for the Development and Natural Resources department of the Khatumo State from 2012 until 2015.

== See also ==
- Politics of Somalia
