= Ali Garad Jama =

Garad of Dhulbahante (r. 1966–1985)

Garad of Dhulbahante
- Reign: 1966–1985
- Predecessor: Garad Ali
- Successor: Garad Abdiqani Garad Jama

Garad Ali Garad Jama was the 19th garad of the Dhulbahante Garadate, from 1966 until 1985, although he was the effective supreme Garad of the Dhulbahante from as early as the 1950s. He is best known for his role as head of the USP party.

== USP political party ==
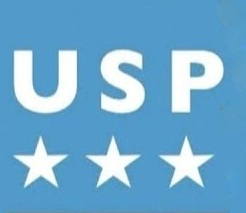
Garad Ali's USP party

As the head of USP, he oversaw the successful election bids of 13 USP representatives, wherein Garad Ali Garad Jama himself became the first post-independence representative of Las Anod city:

MPs for USP
Name	Year	Constituent city	Clan
Abdilahi Qablan	1960	Las Qorey	Dubays / Warsangeli
Mohamud Salax Caddaanweyne	1960	Jidali	Cumar / Warsangeli
Ali Garad Jama	1960	Las Anod	Baharsame / Dhulbahante
Osman Garad	1960	Taleh	Galool Oriye / Dhulbahante
Abdalla Farah	1960	Widhwidh	Barkad / Dhulbahante
Mohamed Geedeeye	1960	Caynabo	Ararsame / Dhulbahante
Ibrahim Eid	1960	Xudun	Naleeye Ahmed / Dhulbahante
