= Abdi Garad =

Somali clan

Cabdi Garaad

Languages
- Somali, Arabic, English

Religion
- Islam (Sunni)

Related ethnic groups
- Farah Garad, Mohamoud Garad, Abdigarad and other Darod groups

Qayaad (Somali: Khayr Cabdi Garaad and Cumar Cabdi Garaad) Full Name: "Abdi Shirshore Habarwa Abdullah Muse Said Saleh Abdi Mohamed Abdirahman bin Isma'il al-Jabarti" is a sub-clan that is part of the Dulbahante clan-family.

The nickname "Qayaad" was supposedly the name of a Gaal (non-Muslim chief) who formerly controlled the clan's territory and whom the clan's forefather killed in battle.

== Distribution ==
In Somalia the majority of the clan reside in the Sool region, with a significant presence in Jubaland in the south. In Ethiopia, the clan lives in the Somali region.

The clan ihabits the following settlements: Docmo, Dharkayn Geenyo, Dhummay, Dabataag, Kalcad (Xargaga) and Las Anod.

== Clan tree ==
The following is a breakdown of the main sub-clans of Qayaad.

- Abdi 'Garad' Shirshore (qayaad)
  - Omar Abdi
  - Khayr Abdi
    - Ibrahim Khayr
    - Osman Khayr
    - Ali Khayr
    - Wa'eys khayr
      - Osman Wa'eys
        - Suban Osman
        - Ali Osman
          - Aweer Ali
          - Nuuh 'dhuub' Ali
          - Khayr 'Mamece' Ali
          - Ahmed Ali
            - Ibrahim Ahmed
            - Samatar Ahmed
            - Sharmarke Ahmed
              - Warsame Sharmarke
              - Hersi Sharmarke
              - Wa'eys Sharmarke
              - Fiqi Sharmarke
              - Eman Sharmarke
              - Samakaab Sharmarke
                - Yusuf Samakab (Bah Halan)
                - Abdulle Samakab (Bah Halan)
                - Dhabar Samakab (Bah Halan)
                - Hassan Samakab (Bah Lagmadow)
                - Ismail Samakab (Bah Lagmadow)
                - Nuur Samakab (Bihina Dalal)
                - Hersi Samakab (Bihina Dalal)
                - Hamud Samakab (Bihina Dalal)
                - Shirwa Samakab (Bihina Dalal)
                - Mohamoud Samakab (Bah Ogaden)
                - Abdi Samakab (Bah Ogaden)
                - Shabeel Samakab (Bah Asila)
                - Koshin Samakab (Bah Asila)
                - Samatar Samakab (Bah Asila)
                - Mohamed Samakab (Bah Asila)
