= Garad Abdiqani Garad Jama =

Garad of Dhulbahante (r. 1985–2006)

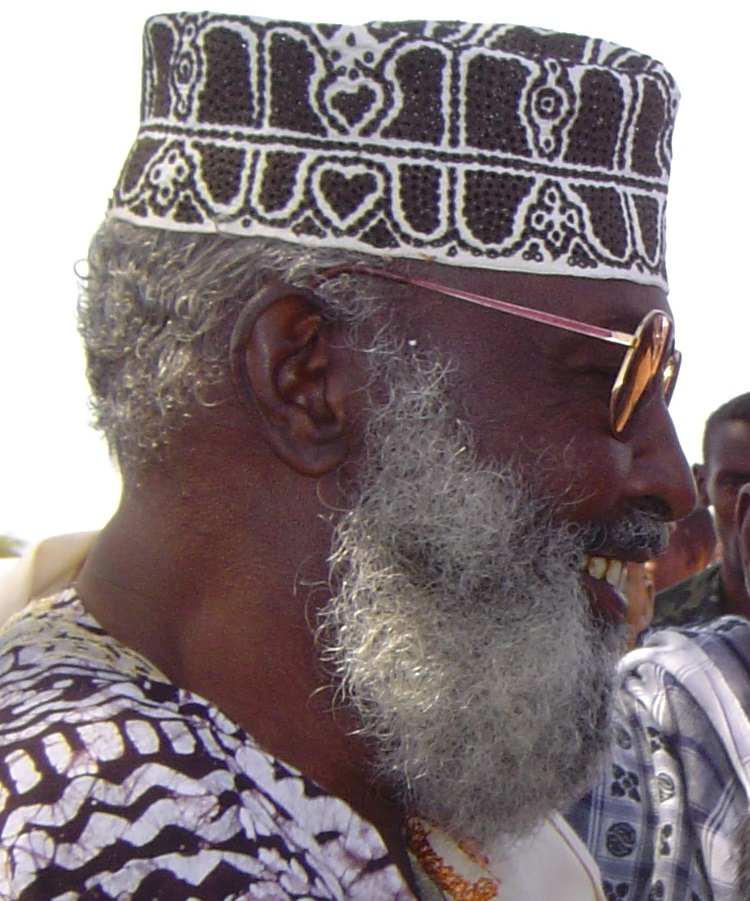

Garad of Dhulbahante
- Reign: 1985–2006
- Predecessor: Garad Ali Garad Jama
- Successor: Garad Jama Garad Ali

10th Foreign Minister of Somalia
- In office: December 1990 – 3 February 1991

Garad Abdiqani Garad Jama (Somali: Garaad Cabdiqani Garaad Jaamac) was the twentieth supreme traditional clan sultan (Garad) of the Dhulbahante, and the tenth minister of foreign affairs of Somalia. In May 1991, the Garad led the Dhulbahante delegation at the Grand Conference in Burao and was first to table the case for Somaliland's secession. He was also one of several signatories of the Somaliland Declaration of Independence on behalf of the Dhulbahante.

Nonetheless, Garad Abdiqani was never fully convinced of Somaliland's secessionist endeavour, and in 1993 he retracted his support for Somaliland when he attended the Boocaame Conference.

== Early life ==
Abdiqani Jama was born in 1935 in Las Anod, British Somaliland, and was one of the first students to attend Las Anod Primary School, which was established in the 1940s. He studied in England in the 1950s, and was a banker in the 1950s and a regional governor in the 1960s. In 1985, he became Galad, succeeding his brother Garad Ali Garad Jama (Ali Jama).

== SULF ==
Garaad Abdiqani was Somalia's minister of foreign affairs in the months preceding and succeeding the fall of Somalia's revolutionary military government in Mogadishu. He thus became the third Dhulbahante minister of Foreign Affairs in Somalia in a row, after Ahmed Qeybe and Ali Jingali.

Garad Abdiqani was a signatory of the 1990 Somali Manifesto that sought to disestablish the military Somalia government, a manifesto group led by Ibrahim Abyan, who was likewise Dhulbahante. The SULF, or Somali United Liberation Front, was the primary form of expression of Dhulbahante anti-government activism against Somalia's military regime during the late 1980s and early 1990s.

== Latter ==
His successor Garad Jama Garad Ali remains opposed to both Puntland and Somaliland.

In December 2003, regarding the Puntland forces that invaded Las Anod, he replied, "I want the Puntland forces to leave, and on the other hand, I don't want the Somaliland forces to come."

He died on February 9, 2006, in Djibouti due to complications from diabetes. Garad's position was succeeded by his brother Ali Jama's son (i.e. nephew), Garad Jama Garad Ali.

== See also ==
- Dhulbahante
