= Dhulbahante =

Somali clan

Dhulbahante الدلبهانتة
- Darod Somali Clan
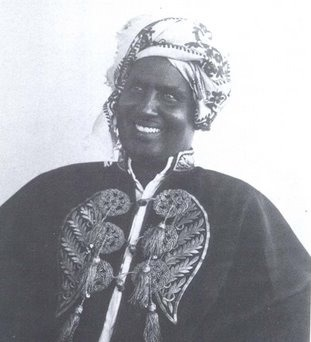
- Abdikarim, son of the Dhulbahante Garad Diiriye Guure. c.1945.
- Ethnicity: (Somalia) Somali
- Location: (Somalia) Somalia (Ethiopia) Ethiopia; Yemen; Oman
- Descended from: Abdirahman bin Isma'il al-Jabarti
- Parent tribe: Harti
- Branches: Mohamoud Garad: Wa'eys Mohamoud; Siad Mohamoud; Farah Garad: Yasin Garad Farah; Abdullahi Garad Farah
- Language: (Somalia) Somali (Arab League) Arabic
- Religion: Sunni Islam

The Dhulbahante, (Somali: Dhulbahante, Arabic: الدلبهانتة) are a Somali sub-clan, part of the Harti branch of the larger Darod clan. They primarily reside in and around their traditional territories of Nugaal, as well as Doollo. The clan's progenitor is buried at Badweyn.

== Overview ==
The current supreme Garad of the Dhulbahante is Garad Jama Garad Ali.

The extended formal name of Dhulbahante, the clan's forefather was Said Saleh Abdi Mohamed Abdirahman bin Isma'il al-Jabarti whose resting place is Badweyn. According to Somali tradition, his mother hailed from the Arap clan of the Isaaq clan-family. This maternal connection has enticed a mutual affinity between the two clans.

The primary homeland of the clan straddles the Haud region and the Nugaal Valley, hence segments of the clan who settle in either plateau are colloquially referred to as the Reer Hawd and Reer Nugaaled. Currently, the clan has 13 active Garads. The most senior Garaad of these traditional leaders is Garad Jama Garad Ali who succeeded his uncle Garad Abdiqani Garad Jama. The use of the traditional hereditary title of Garad (which is most widespread among the Dhulbahante), was first inaugurated by the great ancestor Garad Shirshore who previously served as a Ughaz.

The clan boasts a history of anti-colonial resistance. In a bloody war against the British Empire the Dhulbahante along with several other clans propelled the Dervish movement to defeat the empire in a series of military expeditions. The rebellion caused the death of one-third (or 200,000) of the population of the Somaliland protectorate, most severely effecting the Dhulbahante clan with whom there was no treaty of protection. John Drysdale and Ioan M. Lewis, who had conducted research in British Somaliland in the 1950s, noted that there was not that much of an attachment of the clan to Dervish history at that time. Nevertheless, to honor the Dervish freedom fighters, the name Daraawiish is now given to almost all regional paramilitaries in Somalia.

== Distribution ==
In Somaliland, the Dhulbahante almost exclusively inhabit the Sool region. Michael Walls on the Dhulbahante and Sool says:

"The residents of Sool overwhelmingly hail from a single clan grouping in the form of the Dhulbahante [...]. Sool boasts a degree of kinship homogeneity that is rare even in the Somali Horn".

The clan inhabits Taleh, most of Hudun and most of Las Anod districts, in Sool, Sanaag Toghdeer regions. In a survey conducted in 2011 of Las Anod District 92.5% of the respondents identified as Dhulbahante whilst 2.5%, 1.5% and 1.3% identified as Hawiye, Bantu and Isaaq respectively. In the Sanaag region the clan is only present in the Erigavo district along with the Habr Yonis and Habr Je'lo clans, whilst well represented in the regional capital of Erigavo. Similarly in Togdheer, the clan solely lives in the district of Buuhoodle. The district of Buuhoodle was made a region by the state of Puntland and its name was changed to Cayn in 2004. Hence, the popular abbreviation SSC which denotes the traditional Dhulbahante territories within Somaliland.

In Somalia, they inhabit the Jubaland state, where there is a long settled Dhulbahante trading community in the port city of Kismayo and its surrounding district, in southern Somalia.

In Ethiopia, the Dhulbahante clan settle in the Somali Regional State. They are present in the Dollo Zone, specifically in the woredas of Boh, Danot and Werder, in Ciid.in Ciid In Kenya, there is a small but notable Dhulbahante community in the North Eastern Province. During the Darawiish era, the Bah Udgoon, a Qayaad division had a garesa (dervish fortification) at Qollad near modern Galmudug. During arid soil conditions, contemporary pastoral Dhulbahante nomads likewise divagate halfway towards the Puntland coast.

The Dhulbahante exclusively settle in the northern Somali cities of Las Anod and Buuhoodle. Moreover, they are well represented in the cities of Erigavo and Garowe. The Baho Nugaaled, particularly the Ugaasyo Dhulbahante, are the most geographically dispersed, with towns such as Yoocada in Las Anod district and Bandar Salam in Middle Juba. According to Roy Irons, Dhulbahante were the largest subclan of the northern clans during the onset of colonialism.

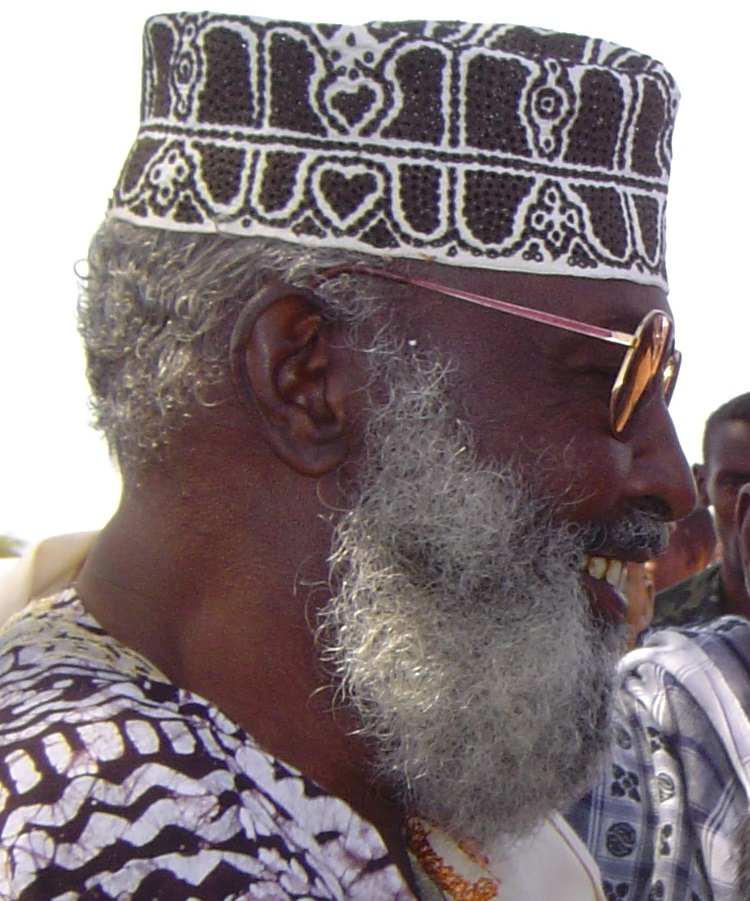
Garaad Abdiqani who was the first to table the case for Somaliland's succession

Somali academic Said Sheikh Samatar stated that the Nugaal, which is formed of the Nugaal plateau beneath the Cal range, and the Nugaal valley in the Sool province, is a Dhulbahante territory, and the site of the biggest Darawiish confrontations:

The climate of the Nugaal, a region which constitutes the heartlands of the Dulbahante, is highly suited for breeding and rearing ponies... The country of the Dulbahante is the prize of pastoral habitat: well-watered and well-pastured, the Nugaal valley provides a welcome sanc-tuary from the perennial twin scourges of Somali pastoralism, thirst and starvation... Demoralized and disorganized, the Dervishes were forced to disperse all over the Nugaal and the Haud after their resounding defeat by the British expeditionary force. Not only did they sustain heavy casualties (7,000 to 8,000 in dead and injured) but also the loss of 20,000 of their best war-horses

The pre-independence Nogal District partly corresponding with modern Sool, was described as "entirely Dolbahanta" by John Hunt. British Colonial Officer John Anthony Hunt, whose word was regarded by Berbera's colonial office as "The Koran, the Bible" described the Dhulbahante as the owners of the Nugaal, the head of the Nogal valley in Badwein being where the clan progenitor/ancestor is buried.

== History ==
=== 19th century ===
19th-century explorer C.J Cruttenden on the Dhulbahante and their Suleiman horse breed:

"The Dulbahanta are a nation who fight chiefly on horseback, their arms being two spears and a shield. Their horses are powerful and courageous; the breed descended, according to Somali tradition, from the stud of Suleiman, the son Of David, and consequently is highly valued. The Dulbahanta, as far as I have seen of them, are a fine martial race of men, second to none...either in conduct or appearance".

The clan boundary between the Habr Je'lo, a clan of the Isaaq clan-family, and the Dhulbahante clan during the 19th century was traditionally in La

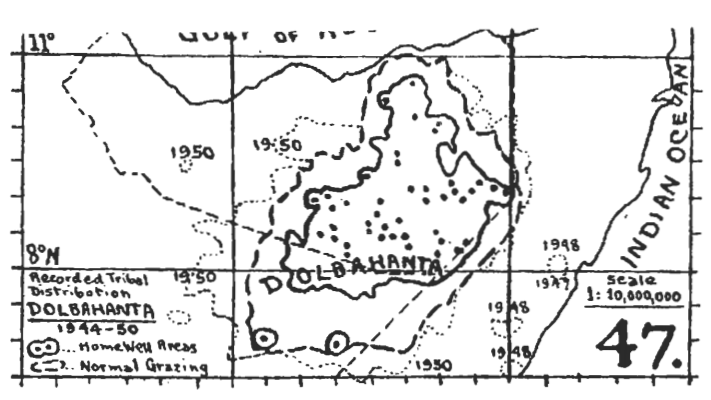
Map of Somaliland showing distribution Dhulbahante Tribe in the eastern Somaliland

ba Garday, a pass in the Buurdhaab mountain chain situated between War Idaad and Wadamago.

The Dhulbahante traditionally had two adjacent kingdoms:

The Dulbahante, as far as I have seen them, are a fine martial race of men, second to none of the branches of Darrood either in conduct or appearance, and they are described as being courteous and hospitable to the stranger who visits them. They have generally two Sultans, or Garaads, the elder of whom, Mahomed Ali Harrin, governs the eastern limits of the province; whilst his colleague, Ali Garaad, (recently deceased) guards the N. W. frontier from the thieving Haber-tel- Jahleh in the neighbourhood of Kurrum and from the Agahdur family of Noh Amor.

— Journal of the Royal Geographical Society

Markus Hoehne described the 19th century existence of a northern Dhulbahante kingdom and a southern Dhulbahante kingdom as follows:

Originally, Dhulbahante had one Garaad who came from the Faarax Garaad branch. It seems that in the mid-nineteenth century, a conflict between the Maxamuud Garaad inhabiting the Nugaal valley in the north and the Faarax Garaad residing toward the south and the Hawd led to the establishment of a separate garaad for the Maxamuud Garaad branch.

=== Dervish Period ===
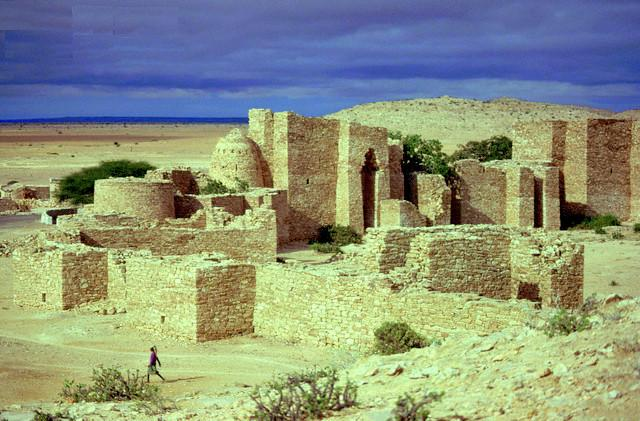
Taleh, the Dervish capital.

Dervish forces mostly hailed from the Dhulbahante. The Dhulbahante in Buuhodle were particularly the first and most persistent supporters of the Dervish Movement. Höhne on the Dhulbahante and the Dervish Movement states:

"The majority of them came from the Dhulbahante clan. Members of this clan were camel herders and renown warriors (Cruttenden 1849). The British had not concluded a ‘treaty of protection’ with them, as they had done with the inhabitants of the coast, who belonged to various Isaaq or Dir clans."

Along with the Dhulbahante, the Ogaden, and segments of the Isaaq such as the Habr Je'lo and eastern sections of the Habr Yunis clan loyal to Sultan Nur were part of the Movement. The Dervish Movement resisted colonial occupation, especially the British who were aided by Isaaq troops.

The Achilles heel of the British empire in the Somaliland Protectorate was the un-administered east, inhabited by the Dhubahante, Warsangali and a few sections of the Isaaq. In this light Douglas Jardine explains that British priority was to keep the former two clans neutral, as the British administration and its allied clans would not be able to resist them without outside aid.

The British found it exceptionally difficult to administer the hinterland in the east, as Jess reports "in 1901 a joint Anglo-Ethiopian expedition of almost 17,000 men failed to accomplish anything other than to drive the Mullah temporarily across the border into the Mijertein". In later years, the British increased their engagement with the hinterland to suppress the movement, yet the previously "insignificant corner of the Empire" proved to be exasperating and costly both financially and in human life.

The British consistently intended the demise and destruction of the Dhulbahante who were avid Dervishes. In this Regard, British Commissioner Eric Swayne was delighted in their slaughter of the Dhulbahante clans.

It is a fortunate thing that the [Qayaad] tribe, which most strongly supported him, appears to have suffered the severest losses.

— Eric Swayne

The Ali Gheri clan were the first tribe to adopt the Dervish (Daraawiish) identity. Colonial administrator Douglas Jardine, stated the following about Dervish demographics:

It is difficult to estimate accurately the number of his sincere converts, but it would be generous to say that there were not less than 2,000 or more than 4,000. Chiefly drawn from the wilder and more remote sections of the Dolbahanta tribe, they represented the true Dervishes, most of whom fell on the field of battle during the earlier expeditions

== Dervish raids on the Dhulbahante ==
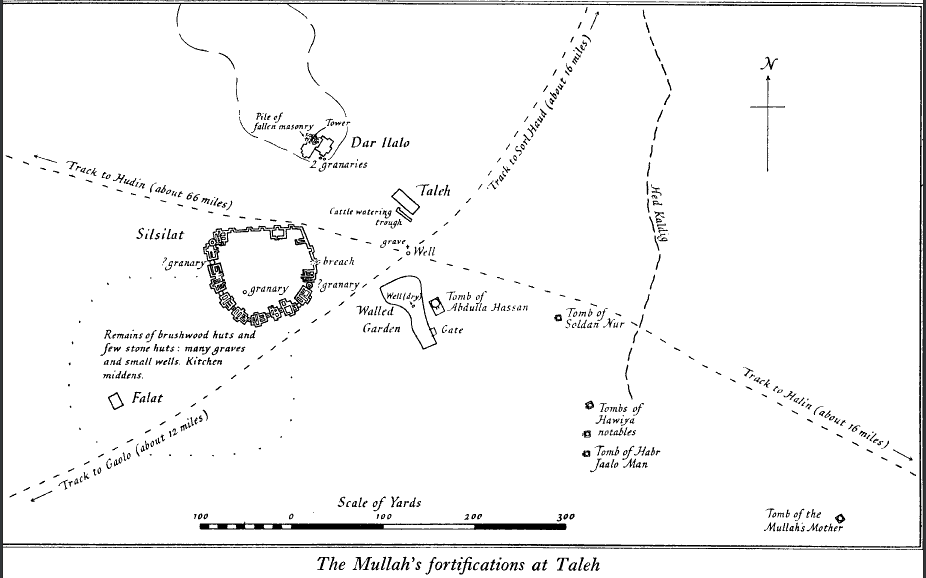
'The Mullah's fortifications at Taleh'

In July 1901, the British made attempts to expel the Dervish Movement out of the Dhulbahante territory, to achieve this they devised a plan to crush "the Dhulbahante who willingly and persistently assisted" the dervishes. A British colonial Officer, Roy Irons believed the Dhulbahante joined the Dervish movement more out of fear rather than ideological devotion and in order to demonstrate British supremacy and power over these clans it was necessary to crush them. Roy Irons, the author of Churchill and the Mad Mullah of Somaliland notes:

It is well known that the Dolbahanta tribe are adherents of the Mullah, more through fear of him than any attachment to his person, or fanatical religious spirit. They are tired of his cruelties and exactions, and the belief of those who best know the country, would speedily transfer their allegiance to us.

— Roy Irons, Churchill and the Mad Mullah of Somaliland

Sections of the Dhulbahante like the Reer Hagar of the Farah Garad and other sections inhabiting Buuhoodle fought alongside the British against the Dervishes after being raided by the Mullah's forces. Dhulbahante friendlies would also sometimes raid the Dervishes, looting their livestock as well as weapons. The book A Fine Chest of Medals: The Life of Jack Archer reports:

Early in October the friendlies at Bohotle made a successful raid south to Gerlogubi, capturing a large number of camels and rifles and killing several more dervishes

— Colin Baker, A Fine Chest of Medals: The Life of Jack Archer, page 151

In 1904 the Dervishes attacked the Jama Siad sub-division of the Mohamoud Garad clan. The Dervishes looted 400 camels while killing two men. The Parliamentary Debates (official Report).: House of Commons in 1913 notes:

So far as I am aware there have been no recent developments of importance in the interior, with the exception of a dervish raid on the Dolbahanta Jama Siad in which the latter lost about 400 camels and had two men killed.

— House of Commons, The Parliamentary Debates (official Report).: House of Commons

The British War Office similarly notes that apart from the Farah Garad sub-division the rest of the Dhulbahante clan joined out of fear of the Mullah or by personal gain:

It is, however, believed that, with the exception of the Ali Gheri and possibly other sections of the Gerad Farih, the majority of the people who joined the Mullah in the Dolbahanta have done so either through fear of him or personal gain, and that a large seceding from his following may be expected when our expedition takes the field

— Great Britain. War Office. General Staff, Official History of the Operations in Somaliland, 1901-04

In 1908 the Dhulbahante once again raided the Dervish and looted their camels. Hassan sent a letter to the British Commissioner Cordeaux, requesting his camels be returned and blood money be paid.

An excerpt from Hassan's letter to Cordeaux reads:

Your people, the Dolbahanta tribe, have killed fifteen of our men and looted eighty-four camels. I do not know if Abdulla Shahari reported this to you: if he did the fault lies with you; if not, I do hereby acquaint you of it. You are requested to restore to us our camels and the blood shed by your people

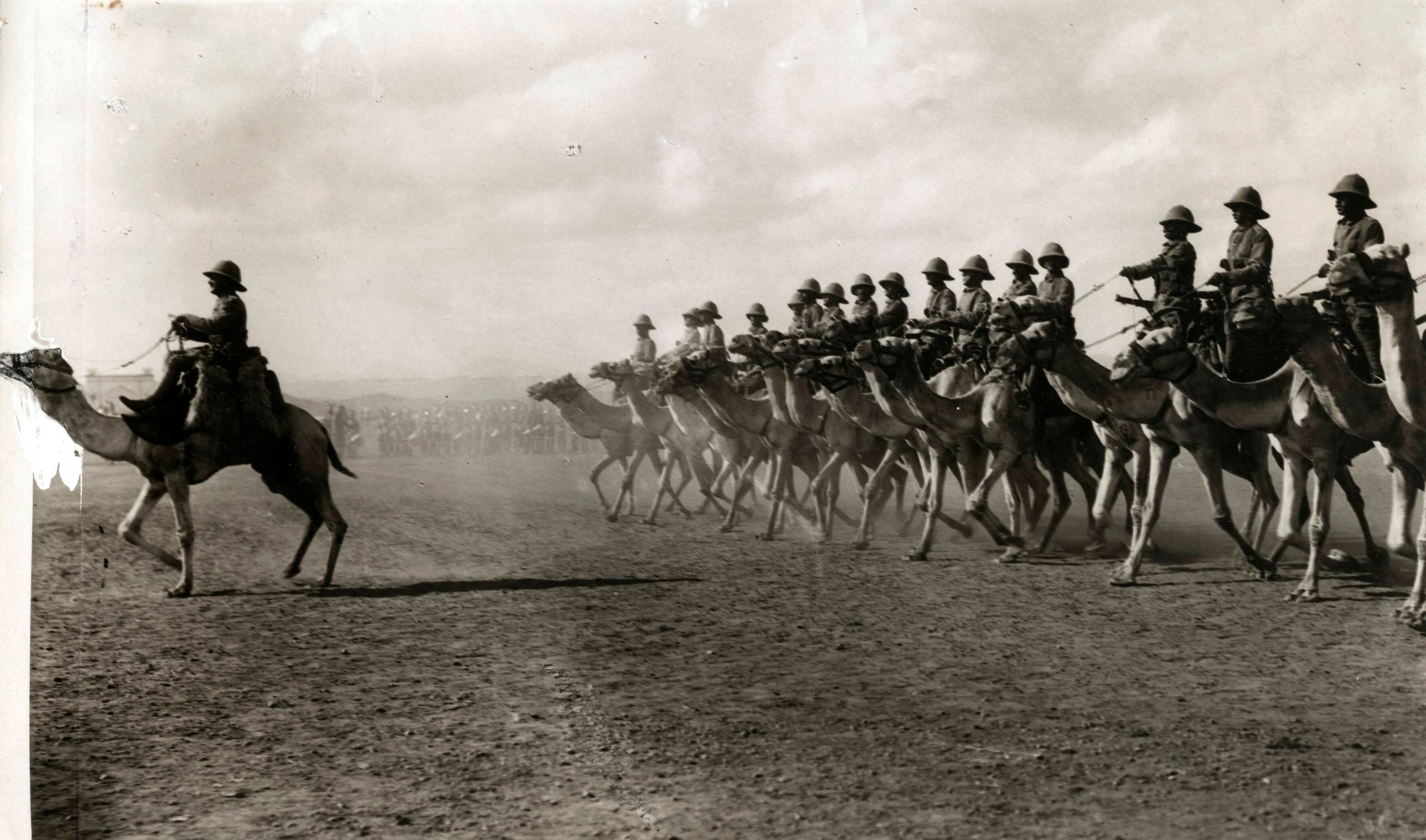
Somaliland Camel Corps

In 1912 the Dervish army compelled friendly segments of the Dhulbahante clan to retire to the British controlled territory to gain protection. This was after the Mullah had constantly launched raids that took a heavy toll on the clan. World War 1 at Sea - Contemporary Accounts reports:

Finally, in 1912, the Mullah himself became active, and raided the Dolbahanta tribe so effectively that they were reduced to starvation, and came in large parties to the coast towns begging the Government to give them food. Then it was realised that the policy of non-intervention in the interior was not altogether satisfactory, and that something must be done to remedy the anarchic condition of the country.

— The Navy Everywhere, 1919

The Farah Garad subclan was also raided by the Dervishes, specifically the Ali Gheri subclan, who were set upon and attacked by Hassan and his Dervish army, forcing them to evacuate and seek refuge in Burao, Berbera and Haud among the Isaaq clans. British colonial governor Horace Byatt reported that 800 Dhulbahante refugees arrived in Berbera, but feared that they could not be protected nor fed properly, stating that only 300 native infantry and 200 King's African Rifles were in Berbera and insufficient to hold off a Dervish attack. Byatt also raised concerns for the Dhulbahante refugees en route to British controlled territory and the possibility of them being looted by hostile clans, particularly the Habr Yunis. Baron Ismay in his intelligence report on the Dervish raids on the Ali Gheri and the Dolbahanta clan's of Bohotle notes:

No important move was made till November 1911, when he successfully attacked the Ali Gheri at Bohotleh. He followed this up in February 1912 with an attack on the Dolbahanta at Eildab, In this engagement our people lost all their stock and were reduced to starvation. They flocked to Berbera demanding to be supported. Yet another attack on Bohotleh in March resulted in the remaining Dolbahanta in that vicinity being looted and driven out. Bohotleh remained in Dervish hands.

In June 1913 the Farah Garad subclan suffered yet another Dervish raid on their towns at Udaweina. General Richard Corfield had in response moved out to the area with his troops to support the shaken Farah Garad, who retreated westwards towards the lands of the Habr Yunis:

In June Corfield, receiving reports that dervish raiders had attacked Dolbahanta Farah Gerad karias (mobile villages) at Udaweina, moved out to support them, but they were so shaken that they retired westward, which then caused trouble with the Habr Yunis

— Roy Irons, Churchill and the Mad Mullah of Somaliland: Betrayal and Redemption 1899–1921

However, the Dhulbahante were not trusted by some British generals. For instance, the British general Eric Swayne at times regarded the clan as too untrustworthy to be enlisted as a levy:

In selecting men, only those vouched for by responsible Chiefs, and those belonging to trustworthy tribes were enlisted, no Dolbahanta being allowed to enter the ranks. Every man before marching out of Berbera was paid an allowance to purchase his own Somali shoes and also a piece of American cloth.

— Parliamentary Papers - Volume 69 - Page 25, 1902

British colonial administrator Sir Douglas Jardine describing the plight of the Dhulbahante noted:

The most pitiful lot of all fell to certain sections of the Dolbahanta. Ousted from their ancestral grazing grounds by the Mullah's advance and bereft of all their stock, the remnants wandered like veritable Ishmaelites in the Ishaak country, deprived of Asylum and almost all access to the coast.

In 1913 at the battle of Dul Madoba the Dervishes defeated the British. The Dervish forces under the leadership of Dhulbahante military commander Ismail Mire were attacked by British expeditionary forces made up of 107 rank and file and 9 extras, thus a total of 116, under the command of Richard Corfield, with 300 accompanying Dhulbahante leaving the battlefield before the first shot was fired. The Darawiish had previously looted the region between Burao and Idoweyne. The British sustained heavy casualties and Corfield was killed in battle, reportedly at the hands of Darawiish Ibraahin Xoorane and Axmed Aarey, and the spoils of war were distributed in Buuhoodle and Taleh.

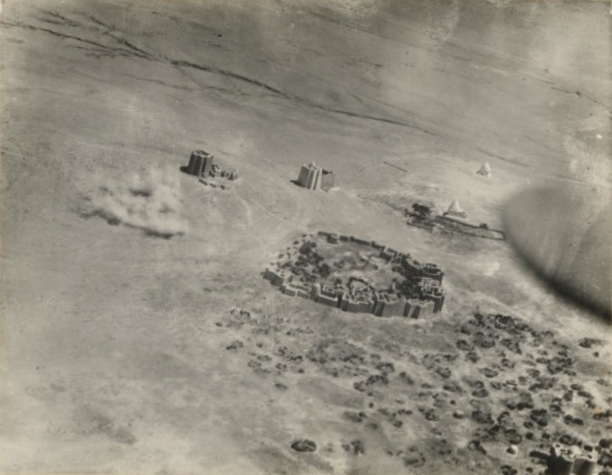
Aerial bombardment of the fortress at Taleh.

After the 1920 bombing campaign of the fortress at Taleh, and the Dervish retreat into Ethiopia, the tribal chief Haji Mohammad Bullaleh, who commanded a 3,000 strong army that was loyal to the British Empire and consisted of Isaaq and Dhulbahante horsemen pursued the Dervish army. They attacked Muhammad Abdallah Hassan and the Dervish army in the Ogaden region and defeated them, causing Hassan to retreat to the town of Imi. Haji and his army looted 60,000 livestock and 700 rifles from the dervishes.

== Politics ==
=== Assassination of Garad Ali ===
During the colonial period, the Chief of the Dhulbahante clan, Garad Ali Garad Mohamoud, did not want to be under British occupation nor under Dervish authority, instead he wanted to retain his autonomy as clan chief. The Garad and Sayyid Mohamed Abdullah Hassan had a heated altercation which concluded with Garad Ali supposedly saying:

"I am the Ruler of Nugaal and its people, their management is mine and I expect everybody to respect it".

Subsequently, Hassan ordered the assassination of the Garad. As Douglas Jardine reports, Hassan took this action after the Garad reassured the British that their relations remained unchanged, although owing to the influence of Hassan his clan no longer obeyed his orders. Issa-Salwe says news of the assassination stunned the Somali clans, consequently Dervishes were only left with the Bah Ali Geri of the Dhulbahante. According to John William Carnegie Kirk, most Dhulbahante clans sided with the Dervishes, expect the three sub-clans of Rer Hagar, Rer Wais Adan and Ba Idris among others who were considered friendly by the British.

In 1959, Garad Ali of Dhulbahante led the foundation of the United Somali Party which forged a political coalition of the non-Isaaq clans of the British Somaliland protectorate. The party won 12 of 33 seats in the House of Representatives in the 1960 general elections. After the unification of the Somali Republic the party united with the Somali Youth League. Later in the aftermath of the Somali Civil War in the 1990s the party re-emerged under the leadership of Mohamed Abdi Hashi this time with a mission to unify the Harti clans under Puntland.

During Mohamed Siad Barre's regime, Dhulbahante was part of an alliance of 3 Darod sub-clans that was presumed to dominate state authority in Somalia. The acronym MOD was used to refer to this alliance which was composed of the Marehan, Ogaden and Dhulbahante.

In early 1993, the Dhulbahante held a conference in Boocame while Somaliland's second national conference was underway in Borama. The result of the conference was the establishment of a 33-member council (Khusuusi) which would administer the Sool, Sanaag, and Cayn regions in the absence of a central government in Somalia.

=== State formations ===
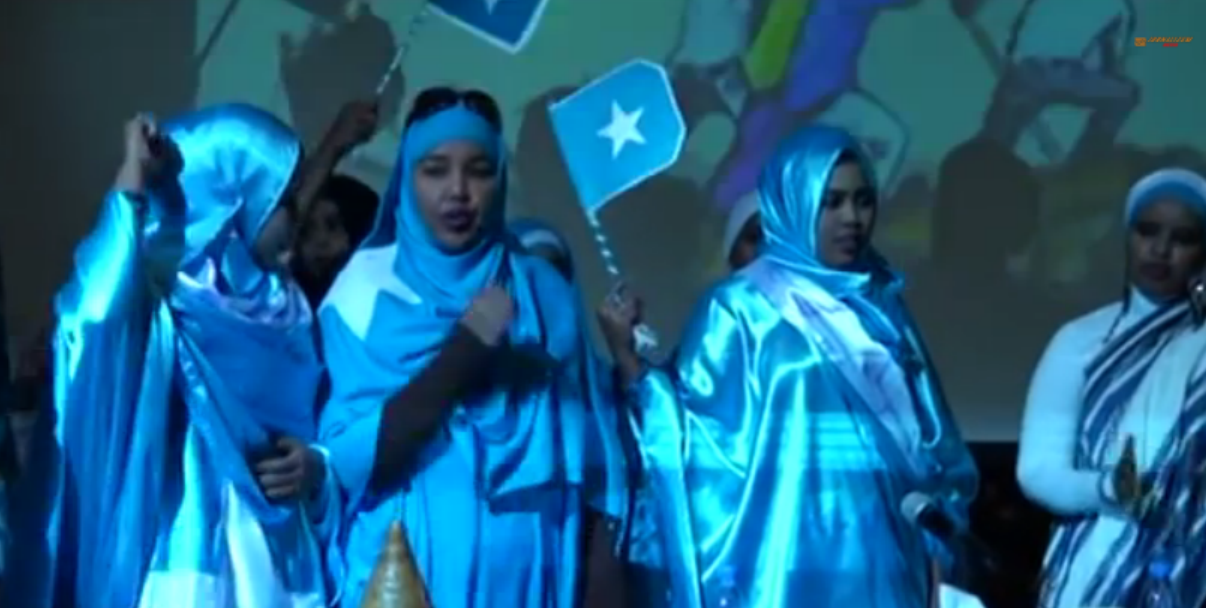
A Khatumo State proclamation ceremony in Dubai (2013).

In 1998, the Dhulbahante established the State of Puntland with other Harti clans due to common kinship. Hence, based on this ethnic composition and clan ties to Puntland, voters in Sanaag and especially Sool were decidedly less supportive of Somaliland's 2001 referendum on the constitution and independence. Although the Dhulbahante community was split over the 2007 conflict, with some aligning with Somaliland and its troops in the area of Las Anod, in the Bo'ame Declaration of 2007 all Dhulbahante clan chiefs rejected Somaliland's secessionist agenda and demanded the withdrawal of its militia from the clans traditional territory.

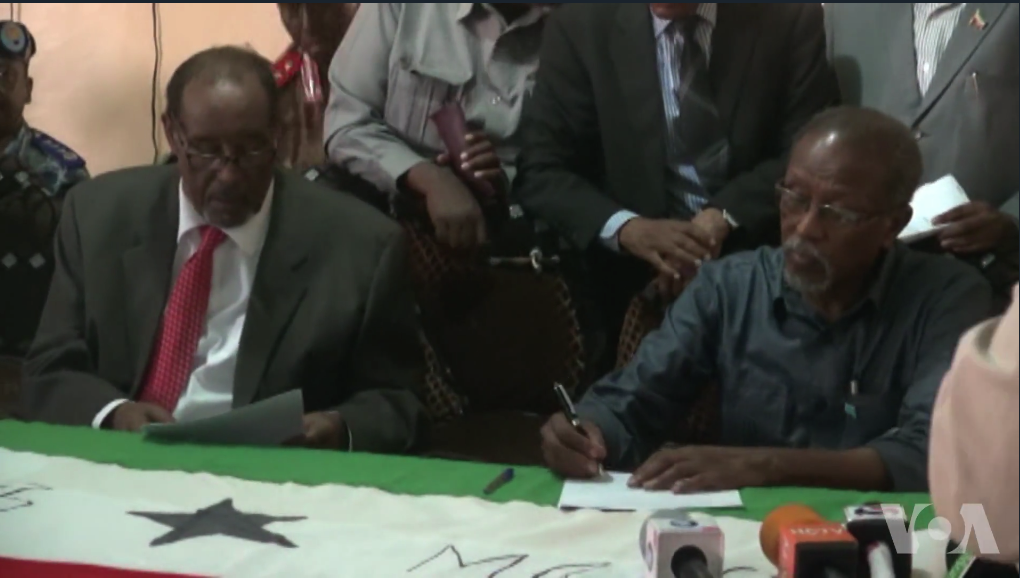
President Silanyo and Ali Khalif signing Somaliland-Khatumo Agreement in Aynabo in October 2017

In aftermath of Somaliland taking control of Las Anod in 2007, the clan became disillusioned with Puntland, consequently the SSC Movement which aimed to remove Somaliland from Dhulbahante territories emerged. The movement was called the Unity and Salvation Authority of the SSC Regions of Somalia (Somali: Hogaanka Badbaadada iyo midaynta SSC (HBM-SSC)), and it was spearheaded by Saleban Essa Ahmed and founded in 2009. The most important traditional leaders who lent their support to the SSC Movement were Garad Jama Garad Ali, Garad Jama Garad Ismail, and Garad Ali Burale Hassan.

In the Kalshale Conflict, Somaliland forces and SSC militia clashed in the Ayn region in 2011, whilst more clashes were reported to have occurred in 2012.

In 2012, the SSC movement was replaced by Khatumo State after the Khaatumo II conference held at Taleh. The conference was a development with up to 5,000 people from the Dhulbahante community gathering in the town.

Under the leadership of Ali Khalif Galaydh, Khatumo State commenced peace talks with Somaliland and subsequently the two entities reached an agreement at the town of Aynabo in October 2017 with Khatumo joining Somaliland, ceasing to exist. Nonetheless, the Dhulbahante still seek a united Somalia and overwhelming oppose Somaliland's independence aspirations.

== Boocame declaration ==
An historic summit was convened in Boocame from November 15 – November 23 of 2007, by the traditional leaders of the Dulbahante (Dhulbahante) sub-clan of the clan. The Dulbahante traditional chiefs issued an official communiqué on October 15, 2007, regarding the secessionist Somaliland region's militias’ aggression and occupation of Laascaanood (LasAnod), the regional capital of Sool, Sanaag and Cayn regions of Somaliland.

All 14 major traditional chiefs of the Dulbahante clan attended this summit. In addition to the traditional chiefs, there were many intellectuals (women & men), students and civic organizations from outside and inside of the country attending the summit. All chiefs unanimously signed declaration communiqué on November 22, 2007.

The communiqué states that the Dulbahante clan is not part of (and was never part of) and does not recognize the administration that calls itself "Somaliland" and that there are no agreements between Dulbahante clan and "Somaliland", in the past or the present. The communiqué also calls for an immediate end of hostility, return of customary peaceful co-existences among clans and an unconditional removal of the Somaliland militia from their territory. Finally, chiefs declared that the Dulbahante clan stands for the Somali unity.

In the anniversary of their historic summit in Boocame in November 2007, the Dulbahante Traditional Chiefs (SSC Traditional Leaders Council) reiterated their previous declaration (above) that they are not part of the Somaliland separatist movement. The council sent its pronouncement to the European Union, United Nations Agencies and all NGOs that operate within Somalia.

== Architecture ==
=== Dhulbahante garesa ===
In the official Dervish-written letter's description of the 1920 air, sea and land campaign and the fall of Taleh in February 1920, in an April 1920 letter transcribed from the original Arabic script into Italian by the incumbent Governatori della Somalia, the airstriked fortresses were described as twenty-seven Dhulbahante garesas the British captured from the Dhulbahante clan: (Note: To see the discussion for the Italian-language wiki community on the Caroselli garesa quote, see this link and this link *The Caroselli source ascribes "garesa" to British captured forts; for a quote that Taleh fort was British captured, see quote "It was most fortunate that Tale was so easily captured" (Douglas Jardine, 1923).)

Ai primi di aprile giungeva, a mezzo di corrieri dervisc di Belet Uen, una lettera diretta dal Mulla “Agli Italiani” con la quale, in sostanza, giustificando la sua rapida sconfitta coll’attriburla a defezione dei suoi seguaci Dulbohanta, chiedeva la nostra mediazione presso gli Inglesi ... Gl’Inglesi che sapevano questo ci son piombati addosso con tutta la gente e con sei volatili (aeroplani) ... i Dulbohanta nella maggior parte si sono arresi agli inglesi e han loro consegnato ventisette garese (case) ricolme di fucili, munizioni e danaro.

Translation:

In early April there came, by way of dervish couriers of Beledweyne, a letter sent by the Mullah "To The Italians" in which, in substance, he justified his rapid defeat by attributing it to the defection of his Dhulbahante followers and asked for our mediation with the English. The English, who knew this, descended on us with all their men and with six birds (airplanes)." ... the Dhulbahante surrendered for the most part to the British and handed twenty-seven garesas (houses) full of guns, ammunition and money over to them.

=== Contemporary ===
Khatumo was responsible for building two airports in the 2010s, initially at Taleh, and subsequently at Buuhoodle.

Hass Petroleum, owned by a Dhulbahante is co-developing the Pinnacle Towers project in Nairobi along with White Lotus Group, a Dubai-based investment firm.

== Sub-clans ==
The clan is divided into two major sub-clans: Mohamoud Garad and Farah Garad. The other sub-clans amalgamate in a loose political and social clan confederation referred to as Baho Nugaaled.

The Dhulbahante has a varying assortment of political subdivisions which in order of size include the highest-level segmentations such as Mohamoud Garad, disparate Dhulbahante political alliances such as Shiikhyaale and Dharbash, xeer groups or chief caaqil groups such as Bah Cali Geri (including Farah Adan & Odala Samakab) or Ararsame (including Wacays Adan and Reer Hagar), and the smallest, the dia-paying groups, such as Rikhaaye subclan of Naleeye Ahmed, the Farah Hagar subclan of Ararsame, or Ebirar subclan of Baho Nugaaleed.

The gaashaanbuur xeer group or chief caaqil group is smaller with a lower level agnation than garaad guud (supreme garaad) group, although larger and a higher level agnation that the typical dia group. Of these three levels of segmentation, only the chief caaqil group is simultaneously tied to a xeer (heer) group. For example, heer laws presented to the Nugal district commissioner in 1947 by various gaashaanbuur xeer groups or chief caaqil groups were as disparate as disavowing endogamy, regarding insults at a shir (council) as liable to a payment of a 150 shilling fine, and ingraining patriarchal norms. Pre-independence, the Farah Garad had three chief caaqils, including the Baharsame, which likewise represented Yasin Garad, the Ararsame chief caaqil (Reer Hagar), which likewise represented Wacays Adan, and the Bah Cali Gheri chief Caaqil, which likewise represented a oneling segmentation:

In 1954 the British and the Dhulbahante had a meeting in Hargeysa. Garaad Jaamac (Baharasame), Xasan Deyl (Chief Caaqil of Cali Geri), Yuusuf Kooreeye (Chief Caaqil of Reer Hagar) and other elders went to Hargeysa to negotiate with the British.

The Ararsame chief caaqil represents the Ararsame twin duo (Hagar and Wacays Adan), whilst the Bah Cali Geri chief caaqil is a oneling segmentation.

== Segmentation ==
There is no clear agreement on the clan and sub-clan structures and many lineages are omitted. Within the Dhulbahante clan, according to the anthropologist I.M. Lewis, the Dhulbahante are divided into 50 groups which pay diyya (or blood money for their members). These are gathered into four lineages of unequal size: the Muuse Si'iid, who made up the majority of the clan circa 1960, and in turn is highly segmented into numerous lineages; the Ahmed Si'id also known as Hayaag, which Lewis estimated to number 1,000 male members at the time, and the Mohamed Si'iid, and the Yuunis Si'iid, which he described as "small, insignificant, and incapable of independent political action." The following summarized clan tree presented below is taken from John Hunt's A general survey of the Somaliland Protectorate (1944–1950):

- Abdirahman bin Isma'il al-Jabarti (Darod)
  - Mohamed Abdirahman (Kabalalah)
    - Abdi Mohamed (Kombe)
      - Salah Abdi (Harti)
        - Said Abdi (Dhulbahante)

clan	parent segmentation	basis	tree
Ugaasyo	Baho Nugaaleed	Uterine	*********Shirshore Habarwa: Hamud 'Ugaas' Shirshore; Hussein 'Ugaas' Shirshore; Mahamoud 'Ugaas' Shirshore; Hassan 'Ugaas' Shirshore; Ali Hassan; Farah Hassan; Samakab Hassan; Khair Hassan; Saleh Hassan; Samatar Hassan; Gedi Hassan; Harun Hassan
Reer Oodeed	Baho Nugaaleed	1949 district commissioner petition	******Ahmed Said (Turyar): Yonis Said; Mohamed Said; Abdi 'Garad' Shirshore (Qayaad); Omar Abdi; Khayr Abdi; Ibrahim Khayr; Ali Khayr; Osman Khayr; Wa'eys khayr; Osman Wa'eys; Suban Osman; Ali Osman; Aweer Ali; Nuuh 'dhuub' Ali; Khayr 'Mamece' Ali; Ahmed Ali; Ibrahim Ahmed; Samatar Ahmed; Sharmarke Ahmed; Warsame Sharmarke; Hersi Sharmarke; Wa'eys Sharmarke; Fiqi Sharmarke; Eman Sharmarke; Samakaab Sharmarke; Yusuf Samakab (Bah Halan); Abdulle Samakab (Bah Halan); Dhabar Samakab (Bah Halan); Hassan Samakab (Bah Lagmadow); Ismail Samakab (Bah Lagmadow); Nuur Samakab (Bihina Dalal); Hersi Samakab (Bihina Dalal); Hamud Samakab (Bihina Dalal); Shirwa Samakab (Bihina Dalal); Mohamoud Samakab (Bah Ogaden); Abdi Samakab (Bah Ogaden); Shabeel Samakab (Bah Asila); Koshin Samakab (Bah Asila); Samatar Samakab (Bah Asila); Mohamed Samakab (Bah Asila)
Reer Aymeed	Baho Nugaaleed	part agnation	******Hussein Said (Hayaag): Abokor Hussien; Amaansame Hussien; Aden Hussien; Ibrahim Aden; Gedi Aden; Hassan Aden (Daljire); Muse Said; Barre Muse; Osman Muse (Ebirrar); Mohamed Muse; Abokor Muse; Abdale Muse; Yahye Abdale; Adan Abdale (Hinjile); Habarwa Abdale; Khalid Habarwa
Baharsame	Farah Garad	part agnation shared xeer group	*******Yasin 'Garad' Farah: Abdulleh Garad Farah; Ali 'Garad' Abdulle; Mohamed 'Garad' Abdulle (Baharsame); Mohamoud 'Garad' Mohamed (Jabane); Mohamed Mohamoud; Warsame Mohamoud; Liban Mohamoud; Sharmarke Mohamoud
Barkad	Farah Garad	agnation shared garad	********Guleed 'Garaad' Abdulleh (Barkad): Ali Gulled; Amir Gulled; Mohamoud Gulled
Bah Cali Gheri	Farah Garad	shared garaad / chief caaqil oneling sons shared xeer group (garaad Soofe dynasty) (garaad Deyl dynasty)	*********Samakab Ahmed (Odala): Egal Ahmed (Bah Cali Gheri); Warfa Ahmed (Bah Cali Gheri); Hassan Ahmed (Bah Cali Gheri); Naleye Ahmed (Egal Naleya, Geshiishe, Bah Ali Gheri); Ali'Geri Ahmed; Ismail Ali’Geri (Lag Madoba); Hersi Ali’Geri; Shawe Ali’Geri; Burale Ali’Geri; Gulled Ali’Geri (Lag Madoba); Subaan Ali’Geri (Geshiishe); Adan Ahmed; Farah Adan (Geshiishe, Bah Cali Gheri); Mahad Adan (Geshiishe, Bah Cali Gheri)
Ararsame	Farah Garad	twinhood shared garad (garaad Cumar Camey) (garaad Yusuf Kooreeye)	**********Wa'eys Adan (Ararsame): Hagar Adan (Ararsame); Gedi Hagar (Bah Ogaden); Addaad Hagar (Bah Ogaden); Warsame Hagar (Bah Ogaden); Elmi Hagar (Bah Ogaden); Amir Hagar (Bah Ogaden); Gulled Hagar (Bah Ogaden); Ayaar Hagar (Bah Warsengali); Fatah Hagar (Bah Warsengali); Adan Hagar (Bah Warsengali); Adan Hagar (Bah Warsengali); Farah Hagar (Bah Warsengali)
Galool Oriye	Maxamuud Garaad	Xaysimo inhabitation (Garaad mashqare)	*******Wa'eys Mohamoud (Omar Wa'eys): Siad Mohamoud; Mohamed Siad (Ugadhyahan); Adan Mohamed; Mohamoud Mohamed; Samakab Mohamed; Abdulle Samakab; Wa’eys Abdulle; Abokor Abdulle; Ahmed Abdulle; Shirwa Ahmed; Osman Ahmed; Nur Ahmed; Seed Nur; Samatar Nur; Yusuf Nur; Musa Nur; Samakab Nur (Bihina Ali); Ismail Nur (Bihina Ali); Hersi Nur; Mohamed Nur; Ali Nur
Jama Siyaad	Maxamuud Garad	1961	********Jama Siad: Samakab Jama; Ahmed Jama; Mohamoud Jama; Warfa Jama
Naleya Ahmed	Maxamuud Garad	19th century secession of northern Dhulbahante kingdom	.: Naleya Ahmed; Adan Naleya; Abdulle Naleya; Samaad Naleya; Shirwa Naleya (Bah ina Farah); Liban Naleya (Bah ina Farah); Yusuf Naleya (Bah ina Farah); Elmi Naleya; Jibril Naleya; Ali Naleya; Farah Ali (Bah Rikhaaye); Mohamed Ali (Bah Rikhaaye); Samatar Ali (Bah Rikhaaye); Igal Ali (Bah ina Araale); Abdi Ali (Bah ina Araale); Fahiye Ali (Bah ina Araale); Ahmed Ali (Bah ina Araale); Hussein Ali (Bah Ina Samatar); Yaqub Ali (Bah Ina Samatar); Yusuf Ali (Bah Abdulle); Elmi Ali (Bah Abdulle); Omar Ali (Bah Idris); Mohamoud Ali (Bah Idris); Wa'eys Ali (Bah Idris)

== Notable figures ==
=== Dynasties ===
- Soofe dynasty of the Bah Ali Gheri
- Bulay dynasty of the Barkad
- Amey dynasty or Kooreeye dynasty of Ararsame
- Shirshoore dynasty of Baharsame and Dhulbahante in general
- Ali Xaram dynasty of the Maxamuud Garaad

==== Dynasts ====
- Garad Abdiqani Garad Jama, Former Garad of the Dhulbahante and the first delegate to table the case for Somaliland's secession at the Burao Grand Conference of 1991
- Garad Jama Garad Ali, Garad of the Dhulbahante Clan.
- Xasan Deyl, chief caaqil of Bah Cali Gheri during independence
- Garaad Abdulahi Garaad Soofe, first chief caaqil of Bah Cali Gheri in the 21st century
- Yuusuf Kooreeye, chief caaqil of Ararsame during and prior to independence
- Omar Amey, the chief caaqil of Ararsame during colonialism
- Maxamed Cali Bulay, chief caaqil of Barkad during colonialism

=== Prime ministers ===
- Ali Khalif Galaydh, Ex-Prime minister of Somalia and Khaatumo President.
- Xaashi Suni Fooyaan, Dervish peace-time prime minister

=== Presidents ===
- Abdihakim Amey, former Puntland vice-president.
- Abdisamad Ali Shire, former Puntland vice-president.
- Ahmed Elmi Osman, Former President of Khaatumo and Incumbent Vice President of Puntland.
- Mohamed Yusuf Jama, former Khatumo president.
- Mohamed Abdi Hashi, President of Puntland.

=== Dervishes ===
- Ali Suji, highest ranked Shiikhyaale general in 1903
- Ismail Mire, latter Shiikhyaale supreme commander, poet.
- Ibraahin Xoorane, assassinator of Richard Corfield

=== Enterprisers ===
- Abdinasir Ali Hassan, Chairman of Hass petroleum.
- Hodan Nalayeh, Somali-Canadian journalist.
- Abdi Holland, Somali artist.
- Aw Jama, Somali scholar, historian and collector of oral literature of Somalia. He wrote the first authoritative study of Dervishes.
- Saado Ali Warsame, singer-songwriter and former MP in the Federal Parliament of Somalia.
- Ali Dhuh, retorting poet.
- Amina Mohamed, former Chairman of the INM and the WTO's General Council, and the current Secretary for Foreign Affairs of Kenya.
- Abdi Bile, Somalia's most decorated athlete with the most Somali national records.
- Mohamed Suleiman, first ethnic Somali to win an Olympic medal.

=== Security ===
- Mohamed Adam Ahmed, former Chief of Staff of the Somali Armed Forces.
- Abdi Hassan Mohamed, Incumbent Police Commissioner of the Somali Police Force.
- Mohamed Isse Lacle, Colonel in the Somali Navy and Former Deputy Minister of Ministry of Ports in Somaliland.
- Saleban Essa Ahmed, SSC Leader.

=== Politicians ===
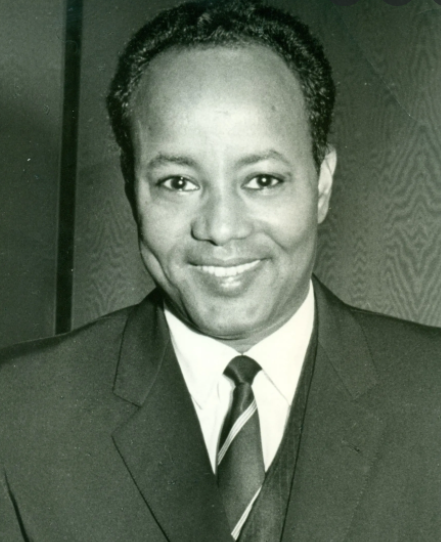
Ahmed Mohamed Adan - foreign minister of Somalia 1990-1991, served as Somalia's Ambassador to the United States, Soviet Union, Britain, and the United Nations.

- Bashe Mohamed Farah, Speaker of Somaliland House of Representative.
- Faisal Hassan, Canadian politician.
- Ibraahim Guure, natural resources minister of Khatumo
- Ali Jangali Somalia's minister of foreign affairs.
- Ahmed Gacmayare, former Information Minister for Khaatumo State.
- Yasin Haji Mohamoud, Foreign Minister of Somaliland.
- Abdiqani Mohamoud Jidhe, Somaliland appointed Governor of Sool.
- Abdirahman Mohamed Abdi Hashi, Former Somali Minister of Fisheries.
- Mohamoud Diriye Abdi Joof, former Khaatumo Minister.
- Ahmed Mohamed Adan, foreign minister of Somalia 1990-1991, served as Somalia's Ambassador to the United States, Soviet Union, Britain, and the United Nations.
