= Abdiqani Mohamoud Jidhe =

Somali politician

Abdiqani Mohamoud Jidhe عبدقاني محمود جده
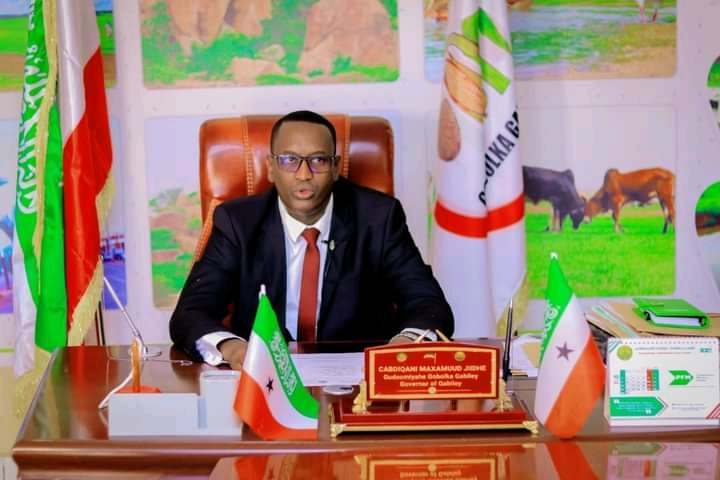

Governor of Sool
- In office 5 January 2019 – 2 November 2021
- President: Muse Bihi Abdi
- Preceded by: Abdi Khayrre Dirir

Governor of Gebiley
- Incumbent
- Assumed office 2 November 2021
- President: Muse Bihi Abdi
- Preceded by: Abdikarim Adan Haji Diriye

Personal details
- Born: Lasanod, Somaliland
- Occupation: Politician

Abdiqani Mohamoud Jidhe (Somali: Cabdiqani Maxamuud Jiidhe) is a Somali politician, who is currently serving as the Governor of Gebiley region of Somaliland since November 2021. He was also the former Governor of Sool region of Somaliland assumed office in January 2019 until November 2021. Where he was assumed as the Governor of Gebiley region of Somaliland. where he is currently serving since 2021.

== See also ==
- Governor of Sool
- Sool Region

Political offices
Preceded by Abdikarim Adan Haji Diriye	Governor of Gebiley; 2021-present	Incumbent
