= Las Anod District =

Las Anod District Degmada Laascaanood
- District
- Country: Somaliland
- Region: Sool
- Capital: Las Anod

Population (2025)
  - Total: 325,000
- Time zone: UTC+3 (EAT)

Las Anod District (Somali: Degmada Laascaanood) is a district Sool. It has its capital at Las Anod. Other settlements include: Saaxdheer, Bo'ame, XidhXidh, Qoriley and Yagori.
