= Awrboogays =

Awrbogays
- city
- Awrboogays
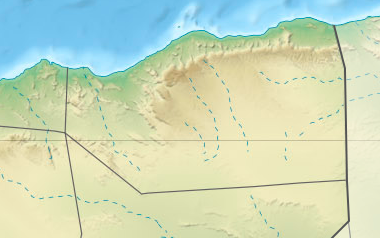
- Location in Somalia

- Location within Sanaag Location within Somalia
- Coordinates: 9°34′05″N 47°45′17″E
- Country: Somalia
- Regional State: North Eastern State of Somalia
- Region: Sanaag
- District: El Afweyn District

Government
  - Type: regional state

Area
  - Total: 1 km^{2} (0.39 sq mi)

Population (2023)
  - Total: 2,500
- Time zone: UTC+3 (EAT)
- Area code: +252

Awrboogays(Awrbogays, Awr-boogays, Ar-boogays) is a town in south-central Sanaag , Somalia.

== History ==
Awrboogays is a town created in 1965. It was firstly founded as a well that was decided for nomads to water their livestock, then it turned into a center where people gathered to buy and sell their livestock. Later, it became a village.

Awrbogays is located in the Sanaag region of Somaliland.

The first institution to teach in English, established in 2008, was the Halgan institute of Awrbogays by Isse Haji. Today, Awrbogays has a primary school, a high school, and religious institutions which are over 20 sectors.

In 2004, malnutrition levels in the Sool Plateau improved significantly, but not in Hingalol and Awrboogays. In January 2013, parallel events were held in Taleh, Buuhoodle, Bo'ame, Awrboogays, and other locations to commemorate the first anniversary of the establishment of the Khatumo State.

In September 2013, the mayor of Hudun district requested the Somaliland government to utilize the underground resources in Awrboogays and other areas in Hudun district.

In October 2013, Somaliland President Ahmed Mohamed Mohamoud visited Awrboogays and announced the elevation of Awrboogays to district (degmo) status.

In January 2015, Somaliland Insurance Minister Suleiman Haglotosiye announced in a speech in Las Anod that he had created an organization to deliver medical equipment and medicines to Kalabaydh, Hudun and Awrboogays.

In July 2016, a peace conference was hosted by the Minister of Somaliland in Awrboogays, where the Maxamud Bari Hiniinle and C/raxmaan Harti branches of the Dulbahante clan spoke.

In September 2020, the Ministry of Health of Puntland instructed to deliver refrigerators and other items to maternity hospitals in Taleh, hudun, Awrboogays and Bo'ame.

In September 2021, fighting broke out between Hudun and Awrboogays, killing a Somaliland military commander in Hudun district.

== Maternity hospital ==
Awrboogays has the first hospital built in the vicinity, and patients come from Dararweyne, El Afweyn, Sarmaanyo, Godaalo, Fiqifuliye, Damala Hagare, Hudun etc. are also patients.

In April 2018, the Somali community in Columbus, Ohio, met to raise funds to build a hospital for mothers and babies in Widhwidh and Awrboogays in the Sanaag and Cayn areas.

In August 2019, a maternity hospital was built in Awrboogays. Until then there was only a hospital in Las Anod.

In June 2020, the first lady of the Federal Republic of Somalia provided medical equipment and medicines to the maternity hospitals in Widhwith and Awrboogays.

== Demographics ==
The city of Awrboogays is primarily settled by the Dhulbahante, with the Naleye Ahmed subsection of the Mohamoud Garaad well represented.
