= Burao-Erigavo road =

Major road in Somaliland

Siilaanyo Road

Route information
- Maintained by Somaliland Road Development Authority (SRDA)
- Length: 284 km (176 mi)
- Existed: 2014–present

Major junctions
- From: Erigavo
- Yufle; El Afweyn; Fadhi Gab; Garadag; Berkad Ali Hersi; War Idaad; Ina Afmadoobe
- To: Burao

Location
- Countries: Somaliland

Highway system

The Burao-Erigavo Road, officially named the Siilaanyo Road (Somali: Wadada Siilaanyo) after former Somaliland president Ahmed Mohamed Mohamoud (Siilaanyo) is a major infrastructure project connecting the cities of Burao (capital of Togdheer region) and Erigavo (capital of Sanaag region). Spanning approximately 284 kilometers, the road is a cornerstone of Somaliland's efforts to enhance regional connectivity, economic integration, and access to critical resources.

== Background ==
Officially launched in March 2014 with a foundation-laying ceremony in Erigavo, the project was hailed as Somaliland's "most ambitious" infrastructure undertaking at the time, aiming to link the resource-rich Sanaag region to central trade hubs like Burao and the Berbera port. The road starts from Ina Afmadoobe on the Burao-Las Anod tarmac road and terminates in Erigavo.

Initial plans envisioned a 375-kilometer route, but subsequent surveys adjusted the length to 284 kilometers, focusing on critical segments between Erigavo and Ina Afmadoobe. The road crosses 163 seasonal rivers (wadis) and streams.

== Construction ==
Construction began in late 2013 under president Siilaanyo, with 94 kilometers paved by 2017. The project faced challenges, including rugged terrain, seasonal floods, and limited funding, as Somaliland relied on domestic resources without international recognition.

His successor Muse Bihi Abdi's administration added 101 kilometers by late 2019, bringing the total paved length to 195 kilometers. Key milestones included the installation of 280 steel-reinforced culverts to mitigate flood damage, costing over $900,000.

The road significantly reduced travel time: pre-construction journeys took 24+ hours, but post-2020 improvements cut this to under 10 hours for smaller vehicles during dry seasons. By 2022 travel time between Burao and Erigavo was cut in half to five hours, with cost of transportation per person being cut from $60-80 per person, to $20. The cost of the construction of the road was estimated at $54,484,000, all of which was covered by the national budget.

== See also ==
- Berbera Corridor
- Somaliland Road Development Authority
- Transport in Somaliland
