= Ananeh =

Lowland region in central portions of the Sanaag region of Somaliland

Ananeh or Anane (Somali: Aanaaneh) is a lowland region in central portions of the Sanaag region of Somaliland. It is bordered on the northeast by the Gebi Valley to the east by the Hadeed Plateau and on the northwest by the flattening slopes of the Golis-Guban range and to the south by Xudun District and Nugaal Valley. Anane is roughly congruous with the Fiqifuliye District.

Anane was notable for serving as the escape route for Sayyid Mohammed Abdullah Hassan's forces northwards to Jidali in the aftermath of the darawiish defeat at Jidbali.
