= Bohol, Somaliland =

Bohol
- Town
- Location in Somaliland.
- Coordinates: 9°21′39″N 47°18′07″E
- Country: Somaliland
- Region: Sool
- District: Hudun

Population (2002)
  - Total: 2,000
- Time zone: UTC+3 (EAT)

Bohol is a town in Xudun District in the Sool region of Somaliland. It is located northwest by road from Xudun and is the second largest town in Xudun District.

== Overview ==
Bohol is located between 2 towns which are Dararweyne and Xudun.

== Demographics ==
The small town of Bohol and the surrounding areas such as Ceel La Helay, Sabawanaag, God Gheere, Docolaha has a total population of 5,346 residents.

The town is primarily inhabited by people from the Somali ethnic group, with the Sa'ad Yoonis sub-division of the Habar Yoonis sub-clan of the Garhajis Isaaq well-represented.

== See also ==
- Administrative divisions of Somaliland
- Regions of Somaliland
- Districts of Somaliland
- Somalia–Somaliland border
