= Dararweyne =

- Town
- Location within Sanaag Location within Somaliland
- Coordinates: 9°45′24″N 47°31′38″E
- Country: Somaliland
- Region: Sanaag
- District: El Afweyn District

Population (2002)
  - Total: 5,000
- Time zone: UTC+3 (EAT)

Dararweyne is a town in south-central Sanaag in Somaliland.

Dararweyne is a town located West of El Afweyn Town .

== History ==
In the early 1990s, the SNM promoted peace among all clans within former British Somaliland, but some SNM militias attacked and killed some Dhulbahante citizens in Dararweyne, Hudun, and Sanirgood. This caused Dhulbahante to remain dissatisfied.

Between January 2 and February 5, 1993, in Dararweyne, among the Habarjeclo Habar Yoonis clan and the Dhulbahante clan, a cessation of hostilities and confirmation by the Habar Yoonis of their agreement at the Erigavo conference. This meeting was suspended for several months because it ran concurrently with the Borama Conference, but resumed in June 1993. This meeting was suspended for several months because it was held in parallel with the Borama Conference but resumed in June 1993 in Fiqifuliye.

In November 2002, UNICEF began rehabilitation work on Dararweyne and other wells.

In May 2009, officials in the El Afweyn, Hulul, and Dararweyne districts stated that 60% of their pastoralist animals had died due to drought.

=== Clan conflict ===
Conflicts between the Biicide branch of the Habr Je'lo clan and the Sacad-Yonis branch of the Habar Yoonis clan have occurred near Dararweyne, with frequent fierce battles centered on El Afweyn and Dararweyne since around 2015.

In August 2016, Somaliland Parliament Speaker Abdirahman Mohamed Abdullahi called for peace to the two clans fighting in Dararweyne.

In September 2016, Somaliland's Minister of Livestock, Minister of Defense, Minister of Aviation, and Minister of Information visited El Afweyn to resolve the inter-clan struggle between Dararweyne and Dogoble. They were divided into groups and met with representatives of the Biciid and Saad Yonis communities in Habr Je'lo.

In July 2017, seven people were killed and 20 injured in the inter-clan conflict in the Dararwayn region. The Somaliland National Army intervened and successfully disarmed the militias.

In January 2018, 15 people were killed and more than 25 injured in two clan conflicts in Dararwayn. Somaliland Vice President visits Dararweyne region and directs security.

In February 2018, Women in the Dararwayn district demonstrate for peace.

In February 2018, the Somaliland military arrested a television director for unauthorized coverage of the inter-clan struggle between El Afweyn and Dararweyne.

In early July 2018, there was a conflict between the Biicide and Sacad-Yonis clans in Dararwayn and neighboring El Afweyn, with the Somaliland army reportedly in between but unable to fully stop the fighting, which could lead to large-scale fighting.

In mid-July 2018, a reconciliation between the two conflicting clans was achieved through the mediation of the Somaliland institution Academy for Peace and Development.

In July 2019, fighting broke out in a village near Dararweyne, killing 10 people.

In November 2019, residents of El Afwayn and Dararwayn signed a peace agreement suspending fighting for four years. The agreement was made by the Salaandiin and Cuqaal clans.

In September 2020, Somaliland's Sanaag Regional Director visits Dararweyne, residents welcome.

In February 2021, Somaliland forces in Dararweyne rebelled and captured two checkpoints in El Afweyn; Somaliland military command in the Sanaag region persuaded them to return to their original positions, but the rebels refused.

In October 2022, an inter-clan struggle erupted in Dararweyne, killing one person and injuring five others.

In December 2023, two clan militias belonging to El Afwayn and Dararwayn fought each other.

== See also ==
- Administrative divisions of Somaliland
- Regions of Somaliland
- Districts of Somaliland
- Somalia–Somaliland border
