= Sarmaanyo =

- Town
- Location in Somaliland
- Coordinates: 9°29′21″N 47°59′38″E
- Country: Somaliland, Puntland), and others are in dispute
- Region: Sool

Population (2007)
  - Total: 1,020
- Time zone: UTC+3 (EAT)

Sarmaanyo is a town in the Sool region of Somalia/Somaliland. (Sometimes considered in the Sanaag region.) The town is predominantly inhabited by people from the Somali ethnic group, with the Dhulbahante sub-clan of the Harti Darod especially well represented.

== Recent history ==
In March 2003, Puntland deployed troops to Sarmaanyo, Hingalol, and Fiqifuliye and other areas along the border.

According to the December 2003 survey, diseases such as diarrhoea, anaemia, ARI and malaria increased, especially in Dhahar, Shimbiraale, Sarmanyo, and Baraakta Qol.

Sarmaanyo and other Sool villages have seen an increase in remittances from the diaspora, up 36% in 2009 and 14% between 2009 and 2010.

In October 2011, SomaliaReport reported that Sarmaanyo in Puntland is one of the most drought-stricken areas in the Sool region.

On January 12, 2012, the Khatumo State was declared. Two days after this declaration, fighting broke out between Somaliland forces and Dhulbahante militias near Buuhoodle. Photos of casualties from this battle appeared on the Internet, leading to pro-Khatumo demonstrations in Las Anod and Sarmaanyo.

In 2013, one of the elders of the Dhulbahante clan Garad Saleban Garad Mohamed held a meeting in Sarmaanyo to discuss the future of the Khatumo State and the Dhulbahante clan, attended by the Ugaadhyahaan clan, but talks were inconclusive and lasted several months.

In December 2013, Garad Saleban Garad Mohamed and other Sarmaanyo elders called a halt to the fighting in the Taleh area.

In July 2014, President Silanyo declared the combined area of Taleh, Sarmaanyo, Halin, Carroolay, and Godaalo as the new Haysimo region.

In January 2015, the local government of Sarmaanyo complained that the problems in the distribution of relief supplies were due to the management of the Puntland Agency for Humanitarian Affairs and Disaster Management (HADMA).

In February 2016, following a large outbreak of Contagious caprine pleuropneumonia and other livestock diseases in the Sool region, the Ministry of Livestock of Puntland conducted a treatment campaign.

In May 2018, residents of Sarmaanyo demonstrated in support of the Puntland army and to the effect of freeing the Sool region from Somaliland's army.

On December 6, 2018, the Puntland government approved a new administrative region for the combined districts of Taleh, Godaalo, Carrooleey, and Sarmaanyo.

In April 2019, Somaliland forces and pro-Somaliland militias occupied the Taleh district of the Sool region. The Khatum Army withdrew without fighting.

In October 2019, a locust infestation occurred in the Hudun area, which includes Sarmaanyo. The mayor of Hudun enlisted the help of the Somaliland Army to exterminate them.

In May 2020, the Somaliland government has built a new health center in the Sarmaanyo district.

In March 2026, it was reported that the Puntland Security Force (PSF), which had been stationed in Qardho, entered Sarmaanyo.

== Demographics ==
The town of Sarmaanyo is primarily inhabited by the Dhulbahante clan. Both Naleye Ahmed and Mohamoud Ugadhyahan sub-sections of the Mohamoud Garad branch. The Abdi Mohamoud sublineage of the Mohamoud Ugadhyahan are well represented and holds the Garadate of Mohamoud Garad, Garad Saleban Garad Mohamed, who was born in this city.
