= Hadeed Plateau =

Hadeed, Sanag, Somalia

The Hadeed Plateau (Somali: Xadeed, Arabic: حَدًيْد) is a rangeland situated in the eastern Sanaag region of Somalia. The plateau dips to the south-east and has substantial areas of gypsum.

Towns and cities such as Hingalol, Armale and Damala Xagare are situated in the plateau. The area is also noted for its wildlife and horse (faras) culture. Known locally as "Sunnari Manaa", the horse breeds mainly graze in the rangeland

== See also ==
- Sanaag
