= Dayaha =

Dayaha Dayaxa
- Town
- Location in Somaliland. Dayaha (Somaliland)
- Coordinates: 10°34′58″N 47°11′11″E
- Country: Somaliland
- Region: Sanaag
- District: Erigavo District

Population (2002)
  - Total: 3,800
- Time zone: UTC+3 (EAT)

Dayaha (Somali: Dayaxa) is a town in the Sanaag region of Somaliland.

== Overview ==
Dayaha is 20 km west of Erigavo, the administrative seat of the Sanaag region the town lies in. Other nearby cities and towns include Burao (363 km), El Afweyn (85 km) and Garadag (160 km).

== Demographics ==
Dayaha is exclusively populated by the Muse Abokor Aduruxmiin sub-division of the Habar jeclo Isaaq.

== See also ==
- Administrative divisions of Somaliland
- Regions of Somaliland
- Districts of Somaliland
- Somalia–Somaliland border
