= Mohamoud Garad =

Somali clan

Maxamuud Garaad محمود جراد

Regions with significant populations

Languages
- Somali, Arabic, English

Religion
- Islam (Sunni)

Related ethnic groups
- Farah Garad (Bah Ali Gheri, Ararsame, Baharsame, Barkad), Baho Nugaaled (Ugaasyo), and other Darod groups

The Mohamoud Garad (Somali: Maxamuud Garaad, Arabic: محمود جراد, Full Name: ’Mohamoud Shirshore Habarwa Abdullah Muse Said Saleh Abdi Mohamed Abdirahman bin Isma'il al-Jabarti ) is a Somali clan. Its members form a part of the Dhulbahante, a sub-division of the Harti/Darod clan-family. The clan is divided into three main sub-clans ― namely the Ahmed garad, the Ugaadhyahan and abdi garad.

The traditional clan chief of Mohamoud Garad is Garad Saleban Garad Mohamed.

== Overview ==
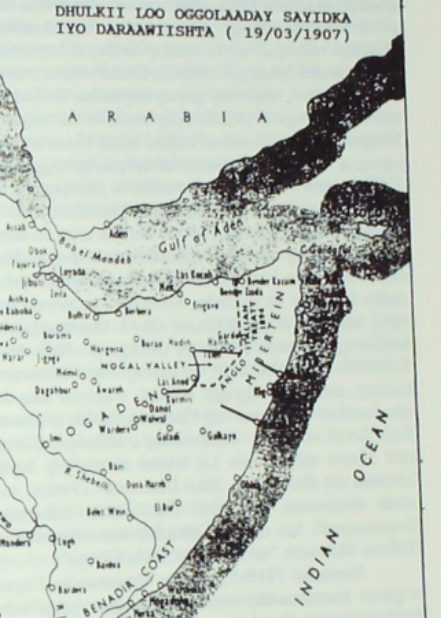
Territory of Darawiish sultan Diiriye Guure in 1907 (marked out in black ink delineation), according to Somali historian Muxamed Ibraahim Muxamed, consisted of the Ciid-Nugaal regions of Nugaal province, Las Anod District, Xudun District, Taleh District, Boocame District and Bookh District.

For political purposes, the Mohamoud Garad further sub-divided into Naleya Ahmed (the numerically largest sub-clan), Jama Siad and a confederation dubbed "Galool oriye" which encompasses all other sub-clans including Nuur Ahmed, Wa’eys Abdulle, Mohamoud Ugaadhyahan and Omar Wa’eys. The Jama Siad primarily inhabit the Casuura plains in western Sool, centred around the town of Yagoori. The Naleye Ahmed occupy a very large territory of centered on the Xadeed plains, of whom the southernmost are centered around Xudun, whilst the northernmost Naleye Ahmed subclans such as Rikhaaye and Bahina Farah have their deegaans (homelands) primarily situated in Jidali as well as the surrounding hamlets of the Barrado plains. The Galool Oriye subclan of Mohamoud Garad is best known for having hosted the first and oldest head fortress of the Darawiish, i.e. the Halin fort, as well as the final Darawiish head fortress at Taleh, and they primarily settle in Xaisimo and its environs.

In the first book written on the colonial wars against the Darawiish written in 1902, Malcolm Mcneill states that the Mohamoud Garad was an enemy Darawiish clan and the one the British hated the most; it also states that British-friendly Somali clans feared the Mohamoud Garad due to them being effective raiders:

Had the Mahmud Gerard not bolted in a body at the first shot ... I feel sure that the enemy's loss during the retreat would have been very much greater. I think every one-British officers and Somalis alike-was thoroughly disgusted with this tribe, more especially as they always had the reputation of being the most dreaded marauders of all the Dolbahanta tribes

— Malcolm McNeill

Eric Swayne was yearning to attack the Mohamoud Garad subclan of Dhulbahante on account of them being Darawiish:

Swayne was anxious to punish the sections of the Mahmud Gerad Dolbahanta who had joined the Mullah, and raided our Habr Toljaala tribes.

— British War Office

However, the Mohamoud Garad was not unanimous in their support for the Dervishes and would sometimes be raided by the Dervishes because of this fact. For instance, in 1904 the Dervishes led by the Haroun attacked the Jama Siad subclan of the Mohamoud Garad. The Parliamentary Debates (official Report).: House of Commons in 1913 notes:

So far as I am aware there have been no recent developments of importance in the interior, with the exception of a dervish raid on the Dolbahanta Jama Siad in which the latter lost about 400 camels and had two men killed.

— House of Commons, The Parliamentary Debates (official Report).: House of Commons

In 1913 at the battle of Dul Madoba the Dervishes defeated the British. The Dervish forces under the leadership of Dhulbahante military commander Ismail Mire were attacked by British expeditionary forces made up of members of the Dhulbahante clan under the command of Richard Corfield. It is reported that the Dervishes previously looted herds from the Jama Siad subclan of the Mohamoud Garad, who subsequently agreed to assist the British in their attack. Thus, 300 Jama Siad warriors along with the Somaliland Camel Corps commanded by Corfield pursued and attacked the Dervishes at Dul Madoba. The British sustained heavy casualties and Corfield was killed in battle, whilst the 300 Jama Siad warriors fled unscathed.

== Subclans ==
=== Jama Siad ===
The first confrontation from the British colonial force was against Jama Siad clan 30 May 1901:

Hearing from prisoners that some encampments of the Jama Siad section of the Mahmud Gerad tribe were some 50 miles off, near Mayo, on the left of the line of advance to Yahelli, Swayne seized the opportunity and sent off the mounted corps under Major Beynon to surprise them ... at Samala on arrival at May 30th, when news was brought in that the mounted corps had succeeded in surprising the Jama Siad sections of the Mahmud Gerad and capturing some stock.

— H. O. Arnold-Forster

According to Malcolm Mcneill, these Jama Siad camels were distributed by the British to the friendly clans afterwards:

On the 12th about 180 men of the Habr Toljala (a friendly tribe) came in from the northward to take chaise of our camels, and on the 14th I was able to send off over 1,800, of which I was very glad to get rid.

Malcolm Mcneill describes Jama Siad as the natives of the area between Oog, spelled Oak, and Saamaale, adjacent to Guumays, and taking 3,500 camels from them on account of them being "powerful" Darawiish:

we started at 2 a.m. from Oak, and halted about 1 1 a.m. at a deep nullah ... On the evening of the 29th Major Beynon, with the Mounted Infantry and the Camel Corps, had gone off in a north-easterly direction to surprise some Karias of the Jama Siad tribe, who were powerful supporters of the Mullah ... surprised these Karias at dawn on the 30th, capturing about 3,500 camels and a fair number of cattle, together with a vast quantity of sheep

==== People ====
- Shire Umbaal, Jama Siad, Darawiish commander
- Yusuf Agararan, Jama Siad, led most successful Darawiish raid since Dul Madoba
- Adan Ali Gurey, Jama Siad, commander of Golaweyne
- Xirsi Cartan, mentioned in the Geoffrey Archer's 1916 important members of Darawiish haroun list
- Serar Shawe, mentioned in the Geoffrey Archer's 1916 important members of Darawiish haroun list

=== Galool Oriye ===
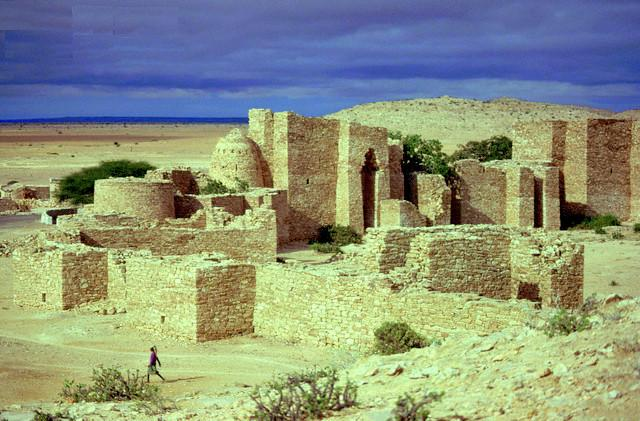
The Dhulbahante garesa fort located in the Galool Oriye town of Taleh

For the link between the Galool Oriye clan and Haysimo heritage, see the Mohamoud Garad#Haysimo heritage section.

the Mohamoud Ugaadhyahan is one of elder lineages of the Mohamoud Garad and holds the traditional secondary supreme Dhulbahante Garad, currently via Garad Saleban. Garad Saleban is a direct descendant of Ali Harran, who during the mid 19th century established a sovereign and independent Dhulbahante kingdom in the northeastern half of Ciid-Nugaal. Traditionally, the two people who held the most senior position within the northern Dhulbahante Kingdom, were the Abbaan' and the successors of Ali Harran. According to British explorer Cruttenden, the northeastern Dhulbahante Kingdom under Garad Ali Harran guarded the northeastern parts of Ciid-Nugaal from the Majeerteen and the northwestern parts from the Warsangeli clan as well as raiders of the Habr Je'lo clan based in Karin:

The Dulbahante, as far as I have seen them, are a fine martial race of men, second to none of the branches of Darrood either in conduct or appearance, and they are described as being courteous and hospitable to the stranger who visits them. They have generally two Sultans, or Garaads, the elder of whom, Mahomed Ali Harrin, governs the eastern limits of the province; whilst his colleague, Ali Garaad, (recently deceased) guards the N. W. frontier from the thieving Haber-tel- Jahleh in the neighbourhood of Kurrum and from the Agahdur family of Noh Amor.

— Journal of the Royal Geographical Society

The Galool Oriye subclan of Nur Ahmed was one of the subclans which attacked a British barracks commanded by British Captain malcolm Mcneill in June 1901 wherein the British tactically prevailed over the Darawiish. The Darawiish clans encumbered 600 casualties in the attack. The other named subclans were primarily Dhulbahante subclans:

he could not have lost less than 600 men killed and wounded . It was also clear that the Kayat, Adan Madoba, Rer Hagar, Ali Gheri, Jama Siad, Nur Ahmed, and Mijjarten tribes were all implicated in the attack on the zariba, as was evidenced by the bodies of men actually shot, and by wounded men

— Malcolm McNeill

==== People ====
- Cali Darmaan Garaase, was a member of the haroun (Darawiish government), of the Nur-Ahmed, a Galool Oriye Dhulbahante clan
- Warsame Ciise Geeldabar, was a member of the haroun (Darawiish government), of the Nur-Ahmed, a Galool Oriye Dhulbahante clan
- Ali Meggar, Darawiish naval commander

=== Naleye Ahmed ===
The Naleye Ahmed, boasts the largest sub-lineage within the Ugaadhyahan and the Mohamoud Garad clan. According to Markus Virgil Hoehne, a conflict anthropologist at the University of Leipzig stated during his trip to Northern Somalia:

"Naaleeye Axmed is probably the largest sub-clan of the Dhulbahante. Its members live in areas stretching from Laascaanood up to Ceerigaabo in Sanaag region."

In Sool, The sub-sub-clan resides primarily in the Hudun District and Las Anod District. in the Hudun District, they make up the vast majority of the residing population, with towns such as Hudun, Lafaweyne, Jidbaale, Dhibshabeel, Shinbiraaley etc... . In the Las Anod District, they reside in towns such as Las Anod, Tukaraq, Adhi Cadeye, Faladyale and others. In Sanaag, the Naleya Ahmed are the primary Dhulbahante sub-clan that resides in the region, with the Erigavo District being their native settlement, with towns such as Erigavo, Fiqifuliye, Jidali, Masagan, Damala Xagare, Ardaa, Dib Qarax etc... and reaching southern towns of the region such as Awrboogays, Sarmanyo and Kulaal historically. John A Hunt stated the following about the location of the Naleye Ahmed territory:

"The Nogal (Las Anod) District defined in 1944. This was supposed to have been done for administrative convenience, but the somewhat crooked boundary between the Burao and Nogal districts suggests that it was intended to make the Las Anod-Nogal District an entirely Dolbahanta Tribal District ... All the Dolbahanta have been Las Anod District since 1944, except for the Naleya Ahmed of the Ogadyahan Siad, of whom the Rer Elmi and part of the Rer Jibril are now Las Anod. The rest remaining in Erigavo District".

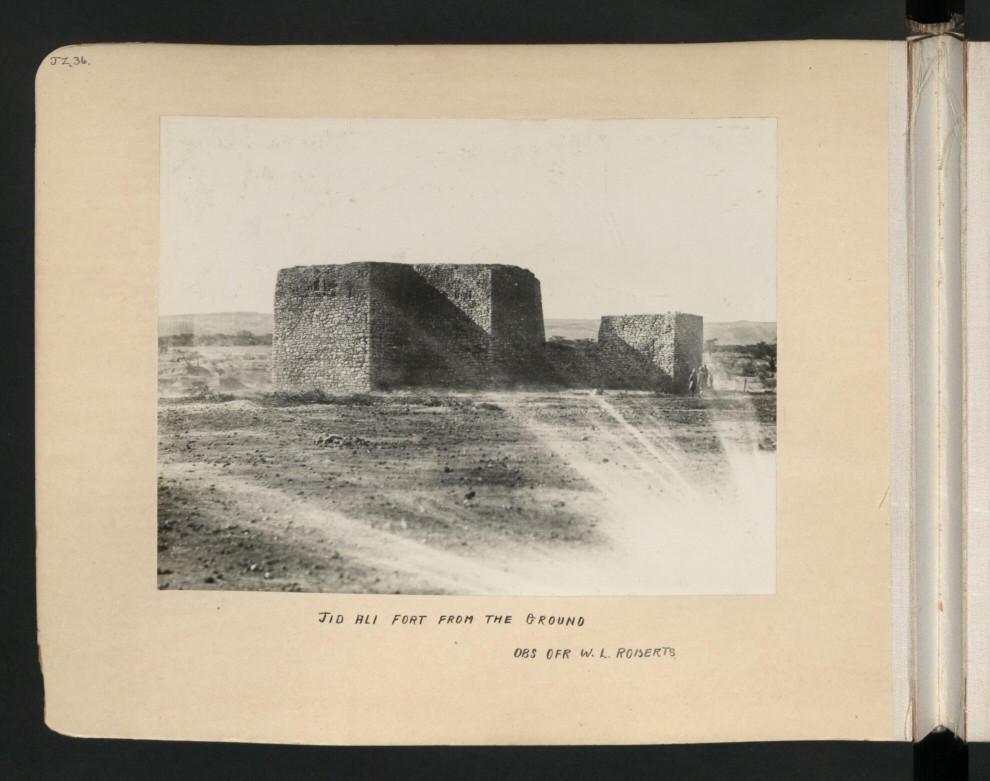
A northern Dhulbahante garesa, the Jidali fort, is located in the western Ugaadhyahan town of Jidali, was a central Darawiish fort with five satellite Dhulbahante garesa forts.

During the 2000s decade, some Somali regional administrations advocated carving out a distinct district for the Bahina Farah, Bah Rikhaaye and Bah-Idoor subclans of Naleye Ahmed called Fiqifuliye District; the Bah-Isaaq Naleye Ahmed is not to be confused with the Warsangeli subclan who settle in the town of Hingalool whom are also called Bah-Isaaq. During the colonial era, the Naleye Ahmed subclan of Dhulbahante was known for coercing neighbouring clans to hold diplomatic relations with the Darawiish. For example, the Habar Yunis clan of Musa Ismail was coerced by Naleye Ahmed Dhulbahante to have diplomatic relations with Darawiish due to their imminent southward migration as a result of abundant rain in the Nugal valley:

On the 12th April spies confirmed our information as to the intention of certain of the Naleya Ahmad section of the Dolbahanta, living behind Heis and Hashow, to join the Mullah immediately. The grazing in the Nogal district permitted them to take their flocks and herds with them. Rain had recently fallen abundantly to the southward, and the movement of the tribes was therefore imminent. The Musa Ismail tribe, which owing to the pressure brought on it by the Naleya Ahmad, had accepted the emissaries of the Mullah.

The Jibril Naleya and Ali Naleya subclans of Naleya Ahmed were singled out by the British colonialist government in Berbera as requiring a heavy penalty for their adherence to Darawiishnimo:

In his letter to the Foreign Office, Swayne informed that he proposed to select the Jibril Naleya and Ali Naleya for severe punishment, "because these sections of the Naleya Ahmad tribe were the prime movers in the fresh disturbances in the east of the Protectorate..."

==== People ====
- Afqarshe Ismail, Adan Naleye, former Darawiish spokesman-poet; and first person to die in an airstrike in Africa
- Nur Hedik, Ali Naleye, commander of the Darawiish cavalry who had a shiikhyaale regiment named after him
- Ibrahim Galongol, Jibril Naleye mentioned in the Geoffrey Archer's 1916 important members of Darawiish haroun list
- Warsame Ali Gulaydh, mentioned in the Geoffrey Archer's 1916 important members of Darawiish haroun list

==== Groups ====
- Indhabadan, was a Darawiish administrative division which was half Mohamoud Garaad, specifically, Naleeye Ahmed.
- Ba Ina Nur Hedik, the entire Mohamoud Garad populated the Shiikhyaale administrative division, however, the Naleye Ahmed were in its aforementioned branch

== Distribution ==
The traditional homeland of the Mohamoud Garad straddles the Nugaal Valley, while they primarily settle in the regions of Sool, Sanaag and Togdheer in Somaliland. In particular, members of the clan are well represented in the districts of Las Anod, Xudun, Taleh, Erigavo and Buuhoodle.

Moreover, the clan has a significant presence in the Somali cities of Las Anod, Erigavo, Garowe and Kismayo.

== Haysimo heritage ==
The regions inhabited by the Galool Oriye subclan primarily consists of the northeasternmost parts of Sool, commonly referred to as the Haysimo region. This is due to the fact that the Galool Oriye clan hosted the earliest Darawiish central fort, the Halin Fort, as well as the final, in Taleh, namely Silsilad. As such the Galool Oriye clan are considered the custodians of the Darawiish central forts, named as Dhulbahante garesas by the Italian governor Caroselli, namely Halin fort and Taleh fort.

=== Halin Fort ===
The notion of the building of fortresses for Darawiish began as soon as hostilities came to light in 1899; as Eric Swayne encountered a fort at Halin during the second expedition in 1902, The British War Office stated that Eric Swayne destroyed the fort in 1902, and that it was inhabited by the Ugaadhyahan Dhulbahante subclans of Naleye Ahmed and Nur Ahmed:

a detached force proceeded the same night to Biyu Gudud and attacked the Naliya Ahmed and Nur Ahmed, the pursuit being carried into the plain of the Northern Hand as far as Kol Dorran. Some guns and ammunition were captured and the tribes fled northward towards some wells about 60 miles from the sea. The whole force then returned to Biyu Gudud on the 1st August, and the dervish fort at Halin (9 miles N.N.E. of Lower Halin) was destroyed.

These Darawiish inhabited forts were referred to by the Sayid and Italian governor Caroselli as Dhulbahante garesas taken from the Dhulbahante clan by the British:

i Dulbohanta nella maggior parte si sono arresi agli inglesi e han loro consegnato ventisette garese (case) ricolme di fucili, munizioni e danaro.

Translation:

the Dhulbahante surrendered for the most part to the British and handed twenty-seven garesas (houses) full of guns, ammunition and money over to them.

Although the endonymic term for Darawiish built installations as per the Sayid and Caroselli are Dhulbahante garesas, colonial sources refer to them as Dervish forts.

=== Silsilad ===
Silsilad was the man building of the Silsilad complex built by Darawiish:

he Mullah moved from the vicinity of Gerrowei to Tale, which from that time forward remained the Mullah's head-quarters until the day of his downfall. At Tale, as the years went by, Arab masons from the Yemen constructed for him a fortress of remarkable strength. To a nomad all permanent locations are an anathema, and it was a striking proof of the Mullah's military genius and adaptability that he should plan and construct so powerful a stronghold. It consisted (*) of a main walled enclosure surmounted by thirteen forts, with three covering forts of great height and strength distant about 200 yards. These fortifications were all stone built, 12-14 feet thick at the base and about six feet at the top, and the covering forts were not less than fifty to sixty feet high. Within these fortifications there were wells; and, within the encircling walls of the silsillat (i.e., chain), there was ample space for many hundred head of stock. There were also numerous stone granaries, forming part of the defences, which were filled with millet from the Mullah's gardens at Gaolo, ten miles distant. But the Mullah did not confine his forts to Tale, and, from this time forward, it was his policy to erect a fort in any district which he desired to dominate.

=== Transit Dhulbahante garesas ===
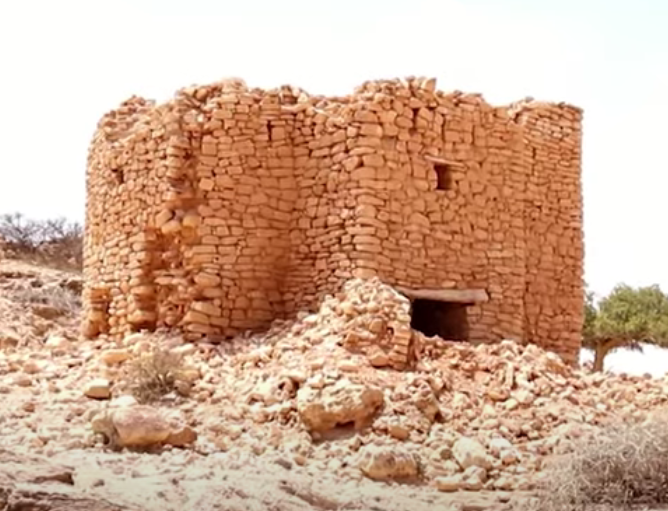
The Yabaayil Dhulbahante garesa, in easternmost Haysimo, connects with Eyl, Puntland.

Transit Dhulbahante garesas were forts that were meant for conveyance to larger Dhulbahante garesa and were typically smaller. The main transit Dhulbahante garesa to the east was the Yabaayil Dhulbahante garesa, a transit site for travel to the Eyl Dhulbahante garesa. The main northern transit Dhulbahante garesa was the Hiilburaan Dhulbahante garesa, situated in the town of the same name.

==== Hiilbuuraan incident ====
The main northern transit Dhulbahante garesa was the Hiilburaan Dhulbahante garesa, situated in the town of the same name. The most notable incident in one of these transit Dhulbahante garesas was the Habar Humbulle incident which pitted the Dervishes against the Majeerteen Sultanate. According to the British Sudan Archives, in the battle between the Dervishes and the Majeerteen Sultanate, Shire Umbaal, spelled as Shira Um Belli, headed the bellicosity against the Italian protectorate known as Majeerteen. (Note: For quotations, see text in the British Sudan Archive image.)

The Mullah's council consists of the following men: Shira Um Belli from the Dolbahanta. This is the man who threatened the Mijjertein and others when they decided to leave the Mullah.

Although the Dervishes were victorious over the Majeerteen, the Habar Humbulle event was described as a pyrrhic victory for the Darawiish:

Sida la weriyey, guutada geesta bari ka soo duushey, waxa tiradeedu ahayd 6666, waxa lagu jaangooyey aayadaha Quraanka, ammaanduule waxa colkaas u ahaa 3 nin oo ilma boqor Cismaan ah, guutadaasi wexey ka soo ambabaxday Dharoor, waxaana soo ambabixiyey oo qiyaasta 30 mayl sagooti u soo raacay Boqorka iyo rag lataliyayaal ah ... In kastoo labada geesoodba la go’ay; geeriyina ayan meel dayan, Daraawiish baa goobtii ku adkaatay xoolihiina la tagtay. Dagaalkaasu wuxuu caan ku yahay oo loo yaqaan Habar Humbulle ... Nin la oran jirey Axmed Cali Xirsi oo dagaalkaa ka badbaadey gabay uu mariyey tuducyo laga hayo waxa ka mid ahaa isagoo wiil yar oo uu dhalay ku halqabsaday

Translation:

It was revealed that the military horde came from the direction of Bari, and it was reported that its troops were numbered at 6666 men, supposedly conforming with the number of verses in the Quran. These troops were commanded by 3 men all of whom were the sons of King Cismaan whom during their departure from the city of Dharoor were accompanied for 30 miles by King Cisman himself and his aristocrats ... although both sides suffered heavy casualties, and both sides were inflicted with irreplaceable losses, the Darawiish were nonetheless the victors, and left with the spoils. This battle subsequently came to be known as Habar Humbulle ... A man known as Ahmed Ali Hirsi who survived this battle narrated a poem which is only partially preserved, and his son has recounted the poem to us.

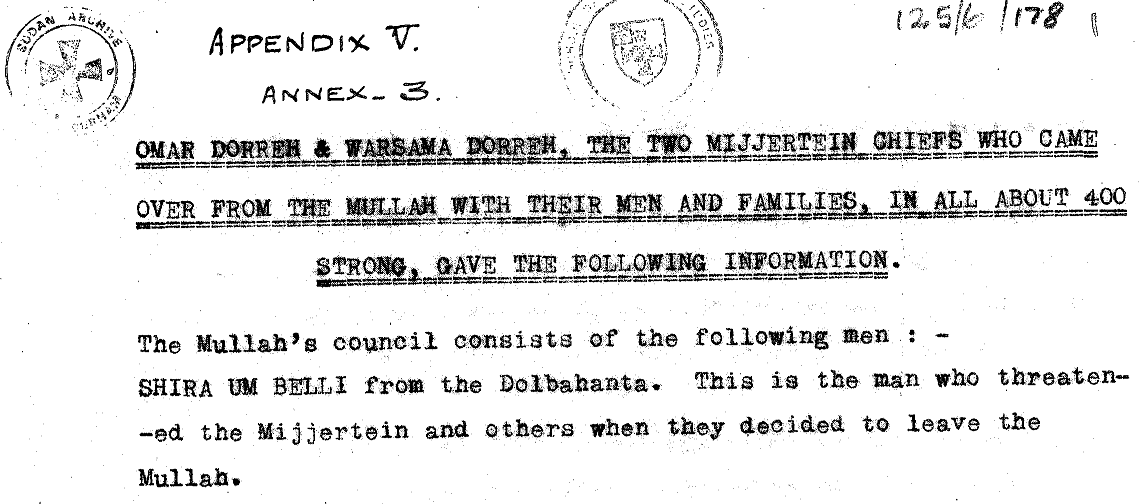
British Sudan Archive describing Shire Umbaal (with Italian spelling of Shira Um Belli) as heading the bellicosity against the Majeerteen Sultanate in the Habar Humbulle incident.

The enemies of Darawiish also engaged in counter-propaganda. The most important of these was the 1910 where they succeeded in instigating a Darawiish civil war. Shire Umbaal led the backlash against mutiny. According to a 1910 intelligence report from the British Aden colony documenting a battle between Darawiish and native auxiliaries of the Italians, Shire Umbaal, spelled in the report as Shire Ambaleh, was described as among the top three highest ranked Darawiish commanders, alongside Nur Hedik and Adam Maleh. The report states that he died in 1910:

The Dervishes loss was undoubtedly severe, and included the following leaders: Adam Maleh, also Shireh Ambaleh, killed. Nur Hedig, shot through both legs.

Shire Umbaal was in 1910 described at the Parliament of the United Kingdom, specifically by Robert Crewe-Milnes, 1st Marquess of Crewe as "a very important leader of the Dervishes".

A native Somali sources states that Shire Umbaal was employed as a leader and organizer of a British orchestrated coup d'état, but that Shire Umbaal subsequently turned on the British colonialists and their native conspirators:

Hase ahaatee, nin raggii talada wax ka gooyey ka mid ahaa, magiciisana la oran jirey Shire Cumbaal ayaa hoos ka dusey oo Sayidkii iyo raggiisii u warramay.

Translation:

Nonetheless, one of the leading figures of this attempted takeover and who led the decisions was Shire Umbaal, who nonetheless had a change of heart and informed the Sayid

Umbaal was a Darawiish whi=stleblower who reported an attempted political overthrow that was attempted upon the leadership of the Somali Darawiish at the end of the 1900s decade.

Noted Somali author Said Samatar in his book Oral Poetry and Somali Nationalism also described the Shire Umbaal incident in his book. Sources overall deliberate on the tumultuous nature of the incident of Shire Umbaal's whistleblowing, with the author Abdisalam Issa-Salwe describing it as having precipitated a Somali civil war:

One of the associates, Shire Cumbaal, changed his mind and alerted the Sayid. Consequently, fighting erupted between troops loyal to Sayid.

Among the three motions put forward by Shire Umbaal and others was (a) to kill the Sayid and replace him with another person, (b) to merely demote the Sayid of all his positions without killing him, (c) to completely dismantle the Darawiish anti-colonial struggle. After a lengthy debate, the third choice was chosen, however Shire Umbaal subsequently turned against the Darawiish defectors and conspirators:

no sooner did the meeting end than one of the participants, Shire Cumbaal alerted the mullah. The result was a bloody battle between the loyalists and the conspirators' clans.

The dialogue between the Sayid and Umbaal was as follows, with Umbaal saying the following to the Sayid:

Rag caawuu geedkii Canjeel ku shirey, waxayna ku tashadeen inay xarunta ka guuraan

Translation:

This evening, a few men held a meeting at the Tree of Canjeel. They decided to abandon the haroun (government)

Shire Umbaal's counter-dereliction to the defection from Taleh that took place in 1909 in the 'Iid and Nugaal region had the effect of extending the longest anti-colonial resistance movement during the Scramble for Africa. Douglas Jardine described the event as follows:

Abdulla Shahari took good care that this damning epistle, which was received in the Mullah's haroun in March, 1909, should be published broadcast throughout the country; and the Mullah's attempts to prevent the purport of the letter from becoming generally known to his following failed. Great was the effect produced on the minds of the Dervishes who have always gone into battle invoking the name of Mohammed Salih. The Mullah's Q'adi, who had great influence with the Dervishes, boldly declared before his master that the Sheikh's condemnation was well merited, and was promptly murdered for his pains. The Sheikh's denunciation and the murder of the much respected Q'adi caused considerable disaffection in the Dervish camp, which culminated in the desertion of the Mullah's brother-in-law and 400 other Dervishes, who took with them a number of ponies and rifles.

=== Landmarks ===
There are many landmarks that ideate the Darawiish, including monuments in Jigjiga and Mogadishu of the Sayid, an airport in Kismaayo, and the Buuhoodle airport which was named after Ismail Mire as Gegada diyaaradaha Ismaciil Mire. Buuhoodle's Ismail Mire airport is the first Somali airport named after a Darawiish figure. Sacmadeeqa is a landmark in Somali Region which has a monument that identifies the birthplace of Sayid Mohamed. It is located in the Haud region, near the lake of Qoob Fardood. It was created as a form of remembrance of the anti-colonial struggle. They said that the most frequent visitors to the monument are the Arale Mahad and Ali Gheri, due to the fact that they were the most persistent dervishes. Dareemacaddo was the site of the creation of the Dervish state of Diiriye Guure. via the practise of Tawassul, and the area itself is one of two deegaans (homelands) of the Arale Mahad clan, alongside Dhilaalo.

=== Extremities ===
The northernmost Dhulbahante garesas were situated in the Surudu Hills and barrado plains in Cal reachable via the Hiilbuuraan transit Dhulbahante garesa. The easternmost Dhulbahante garesa was situated at Eyl, reachable via the Yabaayil transit Dhulbahante garesa. The southernmost Dhulbahante garesa was the Qollad Dhulbahante garesa reachable via the Docmo transit Dhulbahante garesa.

== Clan tree ==
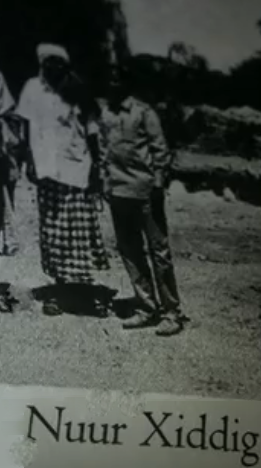
(Abdi) Nur Hedik (white shirt), wearing the emblematic Kuuk Darawiish prayer bead on his left wrist and the emblematic Darawiish duubcad turban on his head; Hedik was the head of Darawiish cavalry who had a Shiikhyaale division named after him, was of the Naleye Ahmed clan.

"There is no clear agreement on the clan and sub-clan structures and some lineages might be omitted." However, the following summarized clan tree presented below is taken from John Hunt's A general survey of the Somaliland Protectorate (1944-1950):

- Abdirahman bin Isma'il al-Jabarti (Darod)
  - Mohamed Abdirahman (Kabalalah)
    - Abdi Mohamed (Kombe)
      - Salah Abdi (Harti)
        - Said Abdi (Dhulbahante)
          - Muse Said
            - Abdale Muse
              - Habarwa Abdale
                - Shirshore Habarwa
          - Mohamoud 'Garad' Shirshore
            - Wa'eys Mohamoud (Omar Wa'eys)
              - Gulled Omar (Bah Barkad)
              - Yassin Omar
                - Sharmarke Yassin
                - Geedi Yassin
                  - Ismail Geedi
                    - Gulled Ismail (Bah Hayaag)
                    - Wa'eys Ismail (Bah Hayaag)
                    - Rage Ismail
                    - Osman Ismail
                    - Hersi Ismail
                    - Adan Ismail
                  - Abdulle Geedi
                    - Adan Abdulle
                    - Mohamed Abdulle
                    - Fiqi Abdulle
            - Siad Mohamoud
              - Jama Siad
                - Samakab Jama
                  - Mohamed Samakab
                  - Adan Samakab
                  - Osman Samakab
                    - Fahiye Osman
                    - Liban Osman
                - Ahmed Jama
                - Mohamoud Jama
                - Warfa Jama
                  - Naleya Warfa (Bah Jibrahil)
                  - Farah Warfa
                    - Diriye Farah
                    - Afi Farah
                    - Nur Farah
                    - Naleya Farah (Bah Hayaag)
                    - Mohamed Farah (Bah Hayaag)
                    - Kooshin "Reer Kooshin" Farah (Bah Hayaag)
                      - Awad Kooshin
                      - Ali Kooshin
                      - Omar Kooshin
                    - Khayr "Reer Khayr" Farah (Bah Hayaag)
                      - Jama Khayr
                      - Da'ar khayr
                      - Egal Khayr
                      - Fahiye Khayr
                      - Mohamed Khayr
                    - Ali Farah
                      - Rageh Ali
                      - Hussein Ali
                      - Mohamed Ali
                      - Orshe Ali
                      - Mohamud Ali
                        - Mohamed Mohamoud
                          - Ali Mohamed
                          - Adad Mohamed
                          - Fiqi-xasan Mohamed
                          - Essa Mohamed
                          - Abdillahi Mohamed
                          - Aw-Abdi Mohamed
                        - Ali Mohamoud
                          - Hersi Ali
                          - Adan Ali
                          - Guled Ali
                          - Shirdon Ali
                          - Mohamoud Ali
                          - Farah Ali
                          - Kulan Ali
                          - Fahiye Ali
                          - Wa'eys Ali
                      - Warsame Ali
                        - Hussein Warsama
                        - Diriye Warsama
                        - Hassan Warsama
                        - Gulled Warsama
                        - Mohamed Warsama
                          - Musa Mohamed
                          - Liban Mohamed
                          - Hussein Mohamed
                          - Hassan Mohamed
                          - Abdi Mohamed
                          - Omar Mohamed
                          - Aralleh Mohamed
                          - Ali Mohamed
                          - Elmi Mohamed
                          - Ahmed Mohamed
                          - Abdi (Adde) Mohamed
                          - Ciye Mohamed
                          - Farah Dheir Mohamed
                            - Fahiya Farah
                            - Mohamoud Farah
                            - Samakab Farah
                            - Rageh Farah
                            - Gulled Farah
                            - Hussein Farah
                            - Abdi farah
                            - Ali Farah
                            - Hir Farah
              - Mohamed Siad (Ugadhyahan)
                - Adan Mohamed
                - Mohamoud Mohamed (Galool Oriye)
                  - Hassan Mohamoud
                  - Mohamoud 'Gaboobe' Mohamoud
                    - Fatah Gaboobe
                    - Shirwa Gaboobe
                    - Geedi Gaboobe
                    - Omar Gaboobe
                  - Abdi Mohamoud
                    - Fahiye Abdi-Mohamoud
                      - Ahmed Fahiye
                      - Dirie Fahiye
                      - Elmi Fahiye
                      - Sharmarke Fahiye
                      - Jama Fahiye
                - Samakab Mohamed
                  - Abdulle Samakab
                    - Wa’eys Abdulle (Galool Oriye)
                      - Naleya Wa'eys
                      - Samakab Wa'eys
                      - Mohamed Wa'eys
                      - Musa Wa'eys "Musa Garad"
                      - Abdi Wa'eys
                    - Abokor Abdulle
                    - Ahmed Abdulle
                      - Shirwa Ahmed (Bah Magaadle) (Galool Oriye)
                      - Osman Ahmed (Bah Magaadle) (Galool Oriye)
                      - Jibril Ahmed (Bah Magaadle) (Galool Oriye)
                      - Haliye Ahmed (Bah Magaadle) (Galool Oriye)
                      - Nur Ahmed (Bah Ceeshla) (Galool Oriye)
                        - Seed Nur
                        - Samatar Nur
                        - Yusuf Nur
                        - Musa Nur
                        - Samakab Nur (Bihina Ali)
                        - Ismail Nur (Bihina Ali)
                        - Hersi Nur
                        - Mohamed Nur (Bah Warsangeli)
                        - Ali Nur (Bah Warsangeli
                          - Ahmed Alii
                          - Yusuf Ali
                          - Wa'eys Ali
                          - Adan Ali nuur
                          - Samakab Ali
                          - Farah Ali
                      - Naleya Ahmed (Bah Ceeshla)
                        - Ismail Naleya (Bah Isaaq)
                        - Mohamed Naleya (Bah isaaq)
                        - Mohamoud Naleya (Bah Isaaq)
                        - Farah Naleya (Bah Isaaq)
                        - Ahmed Naleya (Bah Isaaq)
                        - Adan Naleya (Bah Magaadle)
                        - Samood Naleya (Bah ina Farah)
                        - Shirwa Naleya (Bah ina Farah)
                        - Liban Naleya (Bah ina Farah)
                        - Yusuf Naleya (Bah ina Farah)
                        - Abdulle Naleya (Bah Fiqishini)
                        - Elmi Naleya (Bah Fiqishini)
                          - Ali Elmi "Ali Madoobe" (Bah Habr Je'lo)
                          - Farah Elmi (Bah Habar Je'lo)
                          - Adan Elmi (Bah Habar Je'lo)
                          - Ahmed Elmi (Bah Turwaa')
                          - Yusuf Elmi (Bah Turwaa')
                          - Mohamed Elmi (Bah Warsangeli)
                          - Igal Elmi (Bah Warsangeli)
                        - Jibril Naleya (Bah Fiqishini)
                          - Fahiye Jibril (Bah Isaaq)
                          - Ahmed Jibril (Bah Isaaq)
                          - Hadiyo Jibril (Bah Hayaag)
                          - Samakab Jibril (Bah Hayaag)
                        - Ali Naleya (Bah Fiqishini)
                          - Farah Ali (Bah Rikhaaye)
                          - Mohamed Ali (Bah Rikhaaye)
                          - Samatar Ali (Bah Rikhaaye)
                          - Igal Ali (Bah ina Araale)
                          - Abdi Ali (Bah ina Araale)
                          - Fahiye Ali (Bah ina Araale)
                          - Ahmed Ali (Bah ina Araale)
                          - Hussein Ali (Bah Ina Samatar)
                          - Yaqub Ali (Bah Ina Samatar)
                          - Yusuf Ali (Bah Abdulle)
                          - Elmi Ali (Bah Abdulle)
                          - Wa'eys Ali (Bihi Idarays)
                          - Mohamoud Ali (Bihi Idarays)
                          - Omar Ali (Bihi Idarays)

== Notable Figures ==
=== Enterprisers ===
- Hodan Nalayeh, Somali-Canadian journalist.
- Amina Mohamed, former Chairman of the INM and the WTO's General Council, and the current Secretary for Foreign Affairs of Kenya.

=== Presidents ===
- Abdisamad Ali Shire, former Puntland vice-president.
- Ahmed Elmi Osman, Vice President of Puntland.

=== Royalty ===
- Garad Saleban Garad Mohamed, current supreme garaad of Maxamuud Garaad
- Adan Ali Gurey, Darawiish monarch and commander of Golaweyne

=== Politicians ===
- Yasin Haji Mohamoud, former Foreign Minister of Somaliland.
- Faisal Hassan, Canadian politician.

=== Commanders ===
- Shire Umbaal, Jama Siad, Darawiish commander

=== Athlete ===
- Abdi Bile, Somalia's most decorated athlete with the most Somali national records.

=== Security ===
- Abdi Hassan Mohamed (Hijaar), former Somali Police Force Commissioner.
- Mohamed Adam Ahmed, former Chief of Staff of the Somali Armed Forces.
