= Waqdariya =

Waqdariya Waqdariya
- Village
- Location in Somaliland
- Coordinates: 11°07′03.3″N 47°47′39.0″E
- Country: Somaliland
- Region: Sanaag
- District: Erigavo
- Time zone: UTC+3 (EAT)

Waqdariya (Waqddariya, Waqdariye, Waaq-Dariya, Waqderia) is a coastal village in the Sanaag region of Somaliland.

== Recent history ==
In 1951, Waqdariya is listed in a book published in England under the name "Waqderia" as the coordinates 11°06′N 47°45 E. The inhabitants are mentioned as Musa Ismail of Habar Yoonis.

In 1956, A report entitled The Geology of the Heis-Mait-Waqderia Area, Erigavo District, Somaliland Protectorate Geological Survey was written by Mason et al.

In December 2008, it was reported that pirates of the coast of Somalia was planning to build a base in the western part of Las Khorey, including Waqdariya and Gelweita.

In June 2012, Mayor Las Khorey announced in an interview with Somalia Report that they had deployed youth from Badhan, Dhahar, Hingalol, and El Buh in Laso-surad and Waqdariya to prepare for attacks from Somaliland Marines.

In April 2014, it was reported that there are Metamorphic rock containing ruby and sapphire in waqdariya.Waqdariya.

== Demographic ==
It is inhabited by the Urursuge clan of Habar Yoonis.
