= Masagan =

- Town
- Republic of Somaliland
- Coordinates: 10°28′2″N 47°26′32″E
- Country: Somaliland
- Region: Sanaag
- District: Erigavo District
- Time zone: UTC+3 (EAT)

Masagan is a town in the Erigavo District of Sanaag region of the republic of Somaliland

== History ==
In 2013, a local Islamic madrasah was built serving the residents belonging to the Waylaxidh village of Masagan, serving kindergarten age residents. It was inaugurated by the local clan elder and politician Ismail Ahmed Ali-Suudi.

Local communities belonging to the central and southern areas of the Sanaag region volunteered to build a road connecting their towns to the city of Erigavo, which includes Masagan and its villages.
