= Maduna =

- Archaeological site
- Location within Sanaag Location within Somaliland
- Coordinates: 9.50121°N 47.15578°E
- Country: Somaliland
- Region: Sanaag
- District: El Afweyn District
- Time zone: UTC+3 (EAT)

Maduna (Somali: Maduuna) is a medieval town in western Sanaag region of Somaliland, near El Afweyn.

== History ==
The ruined Islamic city of Maduna is considered the most substantial and most accessible ruin of its type in Somaliland. The main feature of the ruined city includes a large rectangular mosque, its 3 metre high walls still standing and which include a mihrab and possibly several smaller arched niches. The mosque is surrounded by several old houses, most of whom being partially intact. The houses include roofed rooms, as well as compounds of dome-shaped structures lacking doors or windows. Just on a slope below the ruined city stands a baobab tree, large enough to suggest that it was planted while the city was inhabited.

Not much is known about Maduna's history, with its dry-stone architectural style suggesting that Maduna was a contemporary of other ruined cities in Somaliland like Amoud and Abasa, meaning that Maduna was presumably part of the Adal sultanate. Swedish-Somali archaeologist Sada Mire dates the ruined city to the 15th–17th centuries.

== See also ==
- Amud

== Sources ==
- An Archaeological Reconnaissance in the Horn: The British-Somali Expedition, 1975 - Neville Chittick.
