= Gudmo Biyo Cas =

- Town
- Location within Sanaag Location within Somaliland
- Coordinates: 10°35′32″N 46°57′25″E
- Country: Somaliland
- Region: Sanaag
- District: Erigavo District

Population (2002)
  - Total: 2,000
- Time zone: UTC+3 (EAT)

Gudmo Biyo Cas is a district located in the Sanaag region of Somaliland. It is the site of numerous archaeological structures, various tourist places and rock art. Gudmo Biyo Cas is relatively peaceful from the surrounding area.

In March 2026, the Somaliland Ministry of Energy and Minerals conducted an inspection and mineral exploration in Gudmo Biyo Cas.

== Industry ==
Gudmo Biyo Cas is home to wild-growing frankincense, Boswellia sacra, and myrrh, which serve as important sources of income for local residents. However, since high-quality sales networks have been lost, the share taken by middlemen has increased, leading to a drastic reduction in local income.

The nearest central city to Gudmo Biyo Cas is Erigavo, connected by a 90-kilometer road. However, the journey is arduous, and Gudmo Biyo Cas remains relatively isolated.

== Natural environment ==
The endangered Livistona carinensis grows wild in the area, where it is utilized by local residents for construction, roofing, basketry, and the production of mats. To address this, an NGO has undertaken conservation efforts, such as reforestation.
