= Haysimo =

- Region
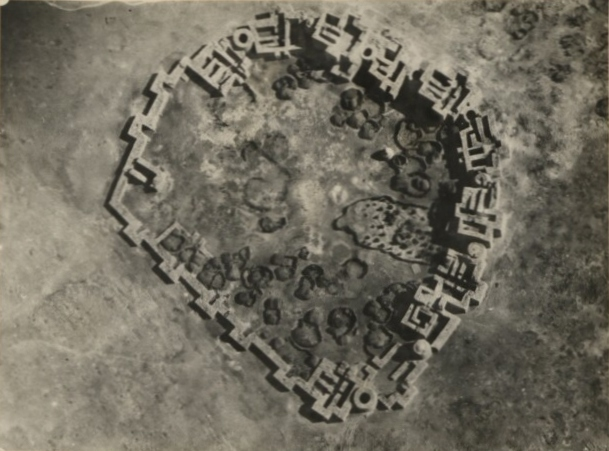
- Dervish fort in Taleh.
- Country: Waqooyi Bari (Somalia)
- Capital: Taleh

Government
  - Type: region
  - Governor: Abdirashid Mohamed Ahmed (Xiir)

Population
  - Total: 82,493
- Time zone: UTC+3 (EAT)

City, Town, Village belonging to Haysimo. The light yellow area is the Sanaag region in the conventional classification.
Ta=Taleh, Sa=Sarmaanyo, Ha=Halin, Ar=Arrolei, Go=Godaalo

Haysimo (Somali: Xaysimo, Arabic: حايسمو) is a province of the North East State of Somalia, and formerly was a region of Somaliland that had existed since 2014. The constituent districts are Taleh, Sarmaanyo, Halin, Carroolay, and Godaalo.

During the 2010s decade, it was an area determined by Presidential Decree and has not been approved by the Parliament, including the latest Somaliland Law, No: 23/2019. In Law No: 23/2019, Somaliland is considered to be six regions: Maroodi Jeex, Togdheer, Sanaag, Awdal, Sool, and Sahil.

== Governor ==
- Governor (Guddoomiyaha Gobolka Xaysimo)
  - Cabdirashiid Maxamed Axmed (Xiir) 2014-
- Lieutenant governor (Guddoomiye Ku-xigeenka Gobolka Xaysimo)
  - Jaamac Ciise X. Shaacuur 2015-
- District Coordinator
  - Rooble Ciise Shacuur 2018-

== History ==
Before its formation in mid 2014, the Haysimo territory was part of the Sanaag and Sool regions.

In July 2014, Somaliland forces captured Taleh, but quickly withdrew under pressure from the United States, the United Kingdom, and the European Union.

In July 2014, President Silanyo signed Presidential Decree JSL/M/XERM/249-2613/072014 elevating the Taleh district to the Haysimo region. This was stated to be based on Article 109, Section 3 of the Constitution of Somaliland. Silanyo elevated several districts to first-level administrative regions in order to attract the interest of local clans. However, at that time there was still no Somaliland government or administrative service agency in Taleh.

According to ACAPS report, FEWSNET stated in its 2014 report that the Somaliland President created this region because of "following increased tensions with Puntland over Sool and Sanaag border regions."

In April 2015, Somaliland troops were deployed to the Haysimo region because of inter-clan fighting.

In February 2016, the Haysimo region participated in the Somaliland presidential election.

In January 2018, Somaliland President Muse Bihi Abdi elected a new governor of the Somaliland regions, but kept Haysimo Governor in office.

In November 2018, Boqor Burhaan Boqor Muuse requested that the Puntland government elevate Taleh from a district to a region.

In December 2019, Somaliland's Minister of Information and Culture Suleiman Yusuf Ali visited Taleh, the capital of Haysimo; Suleiman told Taleh residents not to listen to the Puntland government.

In June 2021, Haysimo governor Xiir visited Halin.

In June 2021, Taleh in the Haysimo region participated for the first time in the Somaliland secondary school entrance exam.

In October 2026, the president of Waqooyi Bari announced that Waqooyi Bari is composed of five provinces. Prior to October, the constitution of Waqooyi Bari claimed that the territory consisted of three provinces, namely Sanaag, Sool and Cayn, or alternatively as Sool, Sanaag and southeastern Togdheer. However the contitutional amendment in October 2026 added two more provinces to Waqooyi Bari, namely Haysimo and Haylaan. The new provinces of North East State of Somalia (Waqooyi Bari) were announced by its president Firdhiye.
