= Midhisho =

- Town
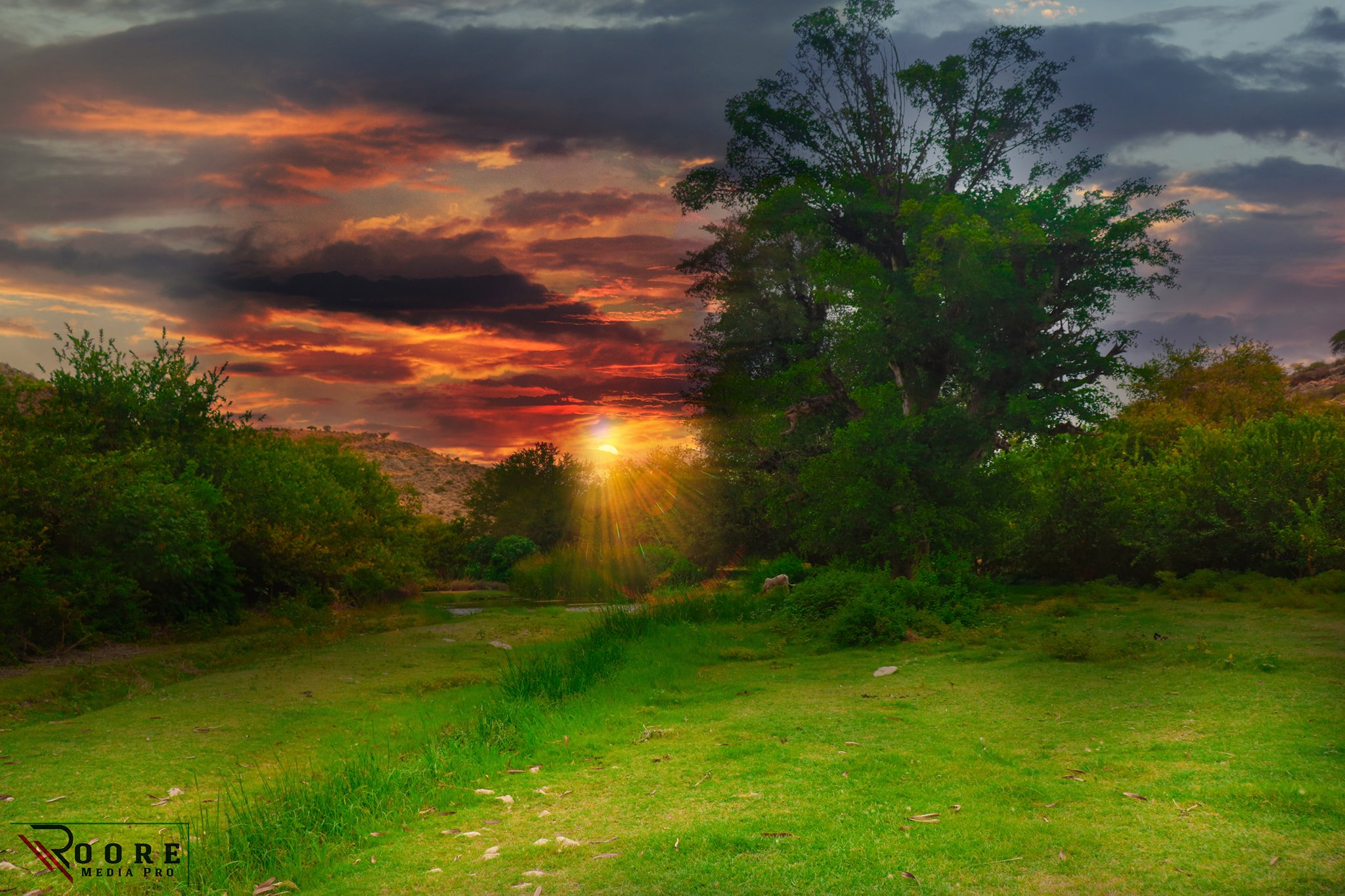

- Location within Sanaag Location within Somaliland
- Coordinates: 10°46′29.8″N 47°30′23.2″E
- Country: Somaliland
- Region: Sanaag
- District: Erigavo District

Population (2002)
  - Total: 1,000
- Time zone: UTC+3 (EAT)

Midhisho, also referred to as Medheshi or Medishe, is a small town in Erigavo District of the Sanaag region of Somaliland.

== Demographics ==
According to a book published in the United Kingdom in 1951, the Midhisho Valley is predominantly inhabited by the Habar Yoonis sub-division of the Garhajis Isaaq as well as the Naleye Ahmed sub-sub section of the Ugadhyahan-Mohamoud Garad branch of the Dhulbahante.
