= Fadhi Gab =

Fadhi gaab
- Village
- Location in Somaliland
- Coordinates: 9°40′02.0″N 47°00′59.3″E
- Country: Somaliland
- Region: Sanaag
- District: Garadag

Government

Population (2002)
  - Total: 3,000
- Time zone: UTC+3 (EAT)

Fadhi gaab is a village in the Gar-adag District of the Sanaag region of Somaliland.

== See also ==
- Administrative divisions of Somaliland
- Regions of Somaliland
- Districts of Somaliland
- Somalia–Somaliland border
