= Bohol (disambiguation) =

Bohol may refer to:

== Places ==
Philippines

- Bohol, an island province
- Bohol Sea

Somaliland

- Bohol, Somaliland

== People ==
- Rolando Bohol, Filipino boxer
