= Lafaweyne =

Town in Sool, Somalia

Lafaweyne Lafaweyne Laf Weyne
- Town
- Location in Somalia Lafaweyne (Somalia)
- Coordinates: 9°9′37.9″N 47°14′17.6″E
- Country: Somalia
- Region: Sool
- District: Hudun District

Population
  - Total: 2,000
- Time zone: UTC+3 (EAT)

Lafaweyne or Lafa Wayne is a town in the Sool region of Somalia. It is located in the Hudun District.

A bore-hole was built up in collaboration with the local residents of Lafaweyne and the Islamic Relief in August 2017.

Lafaweyne is among the towns in the Hudun district to welcome the Mayor of Hudun, Mohamed Jama Hirsi to bring awareness to social issues in the area, with specifics targeting efficient access to water, sanitation, health wellness etc...

Lafaweyne and Jidbale were amongst the cities hit with inner clan skirmishes in the year 2020. A report was conducted by the Somali Red Crescent Society in 2020 listing Lafaweyne, Adhi Adeeye, and parts of Buuhoodle District as conflict areas to receive economic support.

Lafaweyne was among the 12 villages selected in the Sool region to receive water sanitation as well as entrepreneurship training, particularly in business planning, marketing, and many other subjects in October 2022.

== Demographics ==
The town is predominantly inhabited by people from the Somali ethnic group, with the Naleye Ahmed sub-section of the Mohamoud Garad branch of the Dhulbahante, which belongs to the Harti Darod clan, are well represented. The town was inaugurated in the late 2000s by the clan leaders and businessmen belonging to the Jibril Naleye (Reer Jibriil) sub-lineage of the Naleye Ahmed.
