= Oodweyne District =

Oodweyne District Degmada Oodweyne Daad-madheedh Region
- District
- Location of Oodweyne district within Togdheer, Somaliland
- Country: Somaliland
- Region: Togdheer

Population (2005)
  - Total: 42,031
- Time zone: UTC+3 (EAT)

Odweyne district (Somali: Degmada Oodweyne) or Dadmadhedh region (Somali: Gobolka Daad-madheedh) is a district in the central Togdheer region of Somaliland. Its administrative center is Odweyne.

== Administrative Classification ==
On March 25, 2008, Somaliland President Kahin announced that Oodweyne would be upgraded to a region, becoming independent from Togdheer region. However, it has not received parliamentary approval and is still considered part of the Togdheer region, for example, in the 2019 Somaliland Local Government Law.

However, both the Somaliland government and the Somaliland media often report Oodweyne district as Dadad-madhedh region (Gobolka Daad-madheedh). The governor of this area is still appointed as governor of Dad-madheedh region (Guddoomiyihii Gobolka Daad-madheedh) as of 2024.

== Landform ==
The plains of this land-mass was historically referred to as Garoodi.

== Topics ==
In July 2007, it was reported in Hargeysa, the capital of Somaliland, that "protests were occurring in Odweyne over cigarette advertisements," but this turned out to be a false report.

In January 2014, five people were injured and eight arrested in a violent incident.

In 2014, a Somaliland company installed a well to explore for oil in the Oodweyne area.

In October 2014, the governor's secretary resigned.

In October 2018, eight police officers from Odweyne district mistakenly crossed the border into Ethiopia and were arrested by the Somali district government of Ethiopia, but were released.

In January 2024, police seized four trucks used for illegal logging for charcoal purposes.

== Governor ==
Name	Somali name	Term of office		
Name	Somali name	Took office	Left office	Time in office
Mahamed Gahayr Hirsi	Maxamed Gahayr Xirsi		16 Oct. 2011	
Yusuf Ibrahim Gedi	Yuusuf Ibraahim Geedi (Yamaarug)	16 Oct 2011		
Jamal Husein Hure	Jamaal Xuseen Hurre		12 Jul. 2014	
Ali Awil Abi	Cali Cawil Cabdi	12 Jul. 2014	22 Dec. 2015	1 year, 163 days
Ahmed Mahamed Hashi	Axmed Maxamed Xaashi	23 Dec. 2015		
Farhan Hasan Abdi	Farxaan Xasan Cabdi	4 Apl. 2016		
Ahmed Diriye Abdilahi	Axmed Diiriye Cabdillaahi	6 Jun. 2017	14 Feb. 2019	1 year, 253 days
Nur Osman Guled	Nuur Cismaan Guuleed	14 Feb. 2019	22 Feb. 2021	2 years, 0 days
Mahamed Ali Ahmed	Maxamed Cali Axmed	22 Feb. 2021 (Interim)		
Mahamed Diriye Hayd Nur	Maxamed Diiriye Xayd Nuur	11 Sep. 2021	18 Oct. 2023	2 years, 37 days
Mukhtar Abdi Abdilahi	Mukhtaar Cabdi Cabdillahi	18 Oct. 2023	19 Mar. 2024	153 days
Abdirahim Mahamed Ahmed	Cabdiraxiim Maxamed Axmed	19 Mar. 2024		2 years, 200 days

== See also ==
- Administrative divisions of Somaliland
- Regions of Somaliland
- Districts of Somaliland
