= Abdi Hassan Mohamed =

Somali police chief

Abdi Hassan Mohamed عبدي حسن محمد حجار
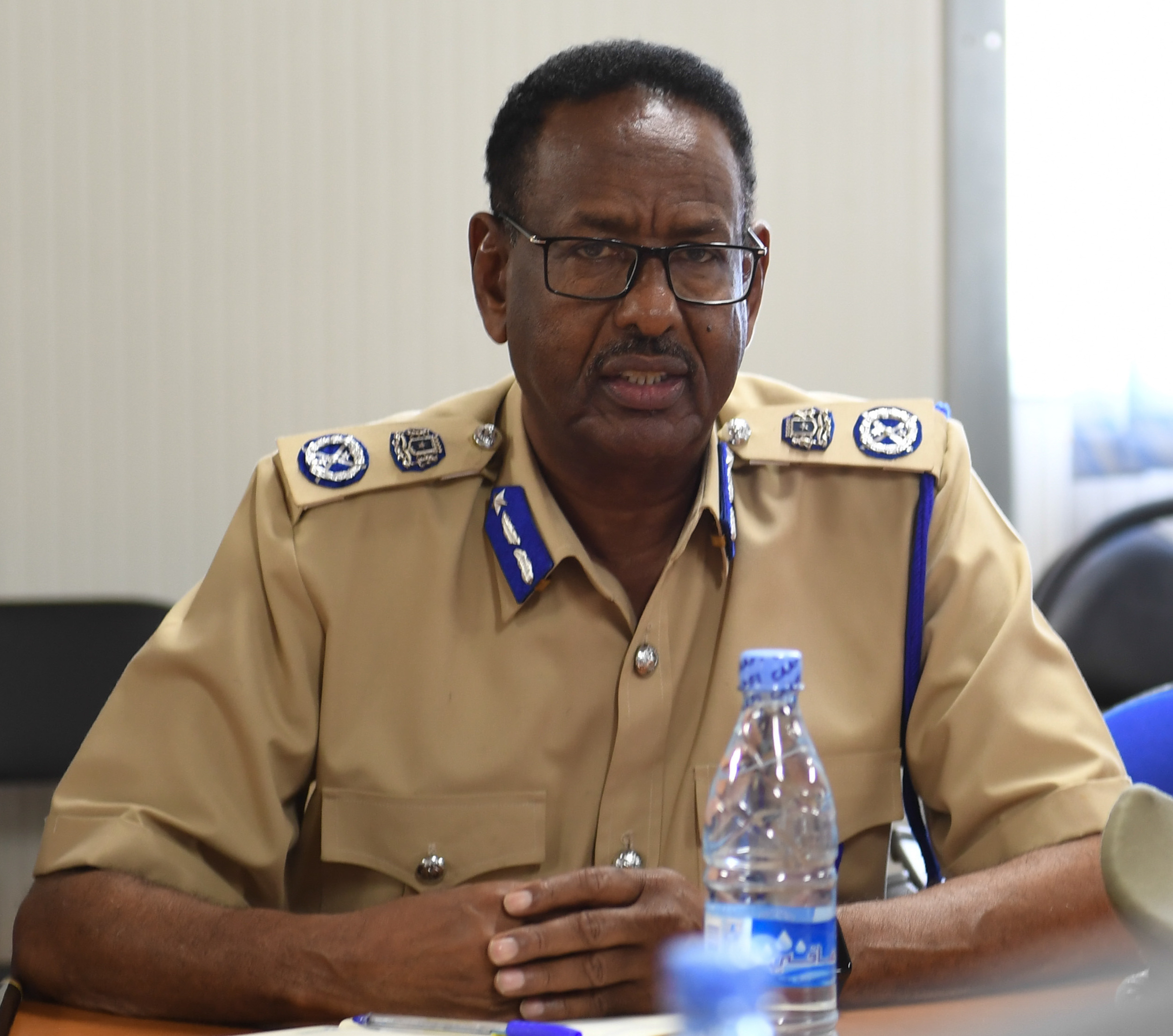

Chief of the Somali Police Force
- In office 22 August 2019 – 26 January 2023
- Prime Minister: Mohamed Hussein Roble Hamza Abdi Barre

Deputy Commander of the Somali National Army
- In office 12 April 2019 – 22 August 2019
- Prime Minister: Hassan Ali Khaire

Commander-in-Chief of the Somali National Army
- In office 2007–2008
- Prime Minister: Nur Hassan Hussein

Personal details
- Born: Las Anod
- Party: Independent
- Education: Somali National University
- Nickname: Xijaar

Military service
- Years of service: 1977-present
- Rank: Police Commissioner (Police); Major General (Army)

Abdi Hassan Mohamed "Hijaar" (Somali: Cabdi Xasan Maxamed Xijaar, Arabic: عبدي حسن محمد حجار) is a Somali police chief and former Army officer. His last position held was Police Commissioner of the Somali Police Force.

== Career ==
Hijar was born in the Sool region in 1953. He hails from the Umar Wa'eys, Mohamoud Garad sub-clan of the Dhulbahante tribe. He completed his primary education in the Benadir region, becoming a graduate of the Somali National University in 1975.

In 1977 he joined the Somali National Army and received his first training at General Daud School. According to the news agency SONNA, he has received commandos training in the United States and Germany and has served as a military trainer at a local training school. In the aftermath of the Somali Civil War, he became the Director of the Somali Immigration and Nationality Agency.

General Abdi Hassan Mohamed was appointed Somalia's Consul to Djibouti in 1989. From 2007 to 2008 he was the Commander-in-Chief of the Somali National Army, and from 2008 to 2019 he was the military attaché of the Somali National Army in Saudi Arabia.

In April 2019, he was appointed Deputy Commander of the Somali National Army, and on August 22, 2019, General Abdi Hassan Mohamed was appointed Commander of the Somali Police Force.

In late January 2023, General Abdi Hassan Mohamed stepped down as Commander of the Somali Police Force. He was succeeded by Sulub Ahmed Firin, who was sworn in at a ceremony held at the General Kahiye Police Academy in Mogadishu on 4 February that same year.

== See also ==
- Politics of Somalia
