= Armale =

Armale Carmaale
- Town
- Location in Somaliland Armale (Somaliland)
- Coordinates: 10°28′48″N 47°57′35″E
- Country: Somaliland
- Region: Sanaag
- District: Erigavo District

Population (2002)
  - Total: 1,000
- Time zone: UTC+3 (EAT)

Armale (Somali: Carmaale) is a town in Sanaag region of Somaliland

== History ==
In July 2007, the district became part of the Maakhir province of Somaliland, which was later incorporated into the autonomous Puntland region in January 2009. Then dissolved later on.

== Geography ==
The town is located in the Hadeed Plateau, a tract of land that covers the middle section of a large area of the Sool Plateau. With the exception of the Riafonleh mountain, this plateau is largely flat.
