= Guud Caanood =

God Caanood
- Town
- Location in Somaliland.
- Coordinates: 10°6′42″N 47°18′23″E
- Country: Somaliland
- Region: Sanaag
- District: Erigavo

Population (2002)
  - Total: 1,000
- Time zone: UTC+3 (EAT)
- Sada Mire, Mapping the Archaeology of Somaliland: Religion, Art, Script, Time, Urbanism, Trade and Empire, March 2015African Archaeological Review 32(1):111-136

God Caanood (Somali: Godcanood) is a town in the Sanaag region of Somaliland. God Caanood (pronounced as God Anod in English) has a ruined old town, according to a scholarly article published by Sada Mire in 2015.
