= Baraakta Qol =

Baraakta Qol Baraagaha Qol
- Town
- Location in Somaliland Baraakta Qol (Somalia)
- Coordinates: 9.5591967°N 48.4874727°E
- Country: Somalia Puntland
- Region: Sanaag
- District: Dhahar

Population (2016)
  - Total: 2,100
- Time zone: UTC+3 (EAT)

Baraakta Qol, also known as Baraagaha Qol, is a town in the northeastern Sanaag region of Puntland. The town is 60 kilometres (37 mi) west of Dhahar in Somalia. In July 2001, the Puntland Security Forces established a military base in the town.

== Recent History ==
Around 2012, refugee camps were established by the United Nations Humanitarian Fund for Somalia, and as of April 2019, 600 families and 4,200 people are living there.

In 2013, a large area of Sanaag was flooded during the spring rainy season, but Baraakta Qol was less affected.

In February 2014, a fire reportedly rained down on a livestock shed in Baraakta Qol.

In May 2018, it was reported that a man from Baraakta Qol received his PhD from the University of Luzon in Philippine, at the age of 27.

In July 2020, the Somaliland army announced that it would open a new military base in Baraakta Qol. Local elders say the purpose of the Somaliland army is border security, and explain that it means nothing more than that.

In October 2020, Baraakta Qol elders announced their support for Somaliland's newly appointed Deputy Minister of Transport.

In November 2020, a meeting was held in Baraakta Qol and a new leader was elected.
