= Yufle =

- Town
- Location in Somaliland Yufle (Somaliland)
- Coordinates: 10°22′33″N 47°11′47″E
- Country: Somaliland
- Region: Sanaag
- District: Erigavo

Population
  - Total: 15,000
- Time zone: UTC+3 (EAT)

Yufle is a town in the Sanaag region of Somaliland. The town is 30 km southwest of Erigavo the provincial capital of the region.

In November 2016, the Deputy Minister of Defense of the Republic of Somaliland visited Yufle.

== Demographics ==
According to a book written in 1952, Yufle was home well (hometown) in a normal dry season for Musa Ismail of Habar Yoonis .

== See also ==
- Administrative divisions of Somaliland
- Regions of Somaliland
- Districts of Somaliland
- Somalia–Somaliland border
