= Garad Saleban Garad Mohamed =

Garad of the Mohamoud Garad
- Reign: 23 October 1983 – 18 November 2022
- Coronation: 10 December 1983
- Predecessor: Garad Mohamed Garad Mohamoud
- Born: Las Anod
- Died: 18 November 2022; Garowe, Puntland
- Father: Garad Mohamed Garad Mohamoud
- Religion: Muslim

Garad Saleban Garad Mohamed (Somali: Garaad Saleebaan Garaad Maxamed) was a Somali clan leader. He was the supreme Garad of the Mohamoud Garad and the second most senior traditional leader of the Dhulbahante clan.

== Overview ==
Garad Salebaan was a prominent and influential traditional leader. He was a founding figure of Puntland in 1998, and also of Khaatumo in 2012 after becoming disillusioned with the administration in Puntland. He has since returned to Puntland as a staunch ally of the regime. He has consistently remained opposed to Somaliland's presence in the Dhulbahante inhabited regions of Sool, Sanaag and Cayn. He has described the Puntland process of choosing legislators as corrupt, and that the Puntland administration regularly rescinds officials chosen by him.

On November 18, 2022, Garad Salebaan died in Garowe, Puntland.

== Maxamuud Garaad ==
#	Garaad	Century	Notes
1	Garaad Shirshoore	16th	Established the Dhulbahante garaadship
2	Maxamuud	16th	
3	Siyaad	16th	
4	Ugaadhyahan	17th	
5	Maxamuud	17th	
6	Cabdi	17th	
7	Faahiye	18th	
8	Diiriye	18th	
9	Yuusuf	18th	
10	Maxamed	19th	
11	Maxamed	19th	
12	Garaad Cali (Xarraan)	19th	First Garad of Mohamoud Garad.
13	Garaad Maxamed	19th	
14	Garaad Cali	19/20th	
15	Garaad Maxamuud	20th	
16	Garaad Maxamed	20th	
17	Garaad Saleebaan	20/21st	

=== Gogosha Yagoori ===
Intermittently, the gogosha Yagoori, a law or peace-making initiative meaning the mattress of Yagoori is set; this occurs during law-making initiatives between subclans or factions of the Maxamuud garaad, typically in the town of Yagoori.

== See also ==
- Dhulbahante
- Garad Jama Garad Ali
- Garad Abdiqani Garad Jama
- Mohamoud Garad
- Sool, Somalia
- Khaatumo
