= Somaliland Road Development Authority =

Government agency in Somaliland

- Native name: Hay'ada Horumarinta Wadooyinka Somaliland
- Company type: Government Authority
- Founded: 2000
- Headquarters: Hargeisa, Somaliland
- Key people: Ahmed Yusuf Mohamed
- Services: Road construction, maintenance and safety
- Website: srda.govsomaliland.org

The Somaliland Road Development Authority, also known as the Somaliland Road Authority (Somali: Hay'ada Horumarinta Wadooyinka Somaliland) (shortened SRA, SRDA) is a government body responsible for the construction, maintenance and safety of Somaliland's national road network. The road authority was established during Somaliland's reconstruction after the conclusion of Somaliland's war of independence. The Road Authority is managed by Somaliland's Ministry of Transportation.

== Overview ==
The Somaliland Road Authority was officially established by presidential decree in March 2000. The SRA was established to create an operational body responsible for the construction and maintenance of Somaliland's 8,770 km road network. Road construction and maintenance is funded through fuel levies, road taxes as well as transport fees charged by the Somaliland government.

The Somaliland Road Authority together with subcontractors have also been responsible for mine-clearing operations all over Somaliland.
