= Damala Hagare =

- Town
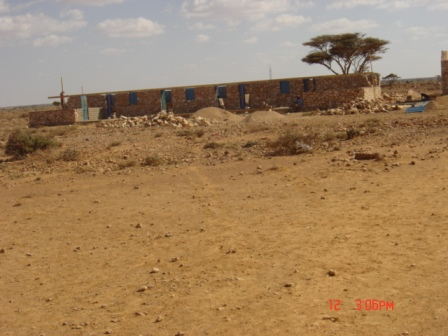

- Location within Somalia
- Country: Somalia
- Region: Sanaag
- maakhir: Erigavo

Population (2007)
  - Total: 45,000
- Time zone: UTC+3

Damala Hagare (Somali: Damala Xagare) is a growing town in the Sanaag region of (Somalia).

Damala Hagare is a rapidly growing town located in the Sanaag region of Somalia. It serves as an important economic and social hub for the surrounding rural communities. The town’s surrounding geographical landscape is characterized by vast, flat grazing lands, known as “Dooxadda Dureera”, making it highly suitable for both agriculture and livestock rearing, two primary economic activities that sustain the livelihoods of its residents. With a population exceeding 45,000, Damala Hagare has experienced steady growth, driven by increased settlement and economic activity in the region.

A notable feature of the town is an area abundant in natural water wells, which provide a crucial water source for domestic use, agriculture, and livestock. This natural water availability significantly contributes to the town’s growth, agricultural productivity and supports pastoralist communities.

Damala Hagare has a developing education system, including a secondary school, an elementary school, and a middle school, offering basic education to the town’s youth. However, access to higher education and specialized training remains limited, necessitating travel to larger cities for advanced studies.

The town also hosts a large healthcare facility, which includes a maternity and child health center (MCH). This facility plays a vital role in providing essential medical services, particularly in maternal and child health, which are critical areas of healthcare in rural Somalia. Despite these healthcare provisions, the facility faces challenges such as limited medical supplies, a shortage of trained healthcare professionals such as midwives and public health nurses, and a need for expanded services to address the growing population’s healthcare demands.

Overall, Damala Hagare is a developing town with significant economic and social influence. In addition, further investment in infrastructure, education, and healthcare services are essential to support its continued growth and improve the well-being of its residents.

== Recent History ==
In November 2005, the Sanaag region was reported to be experiencing water shortages, and Damala Hagare was one of the worst affected areas.

In March 2013, a peace conference between the Warsangali and Dhulbahante clans was held in Damara Hagare.

In September 2014, Somaliland's Defense Minister attempted to attend a meeting of the Warsangali clans in Hingalol, but was unable to do so and was stranded in Damara Hagale.

In May 2019, Somaliland and Puntland troops clashed in Damala Hagare. The total number of dead on both sides is estimated at nine. In June, the Somaliland army deployed troops, including armored vehicles, to Yubbe, Hadaftimo, and Damala Hagare for border security from Puntland.

In September 2019, the local community of Damala Hagare passed a resolution against charcoal production, which causes environmental damage.

== Demographics ==
The town of Damala Hagare is unique in its composition and size. It is partially divided into two areas or settlements. Bahogeyslabe, Gerad Abdalle Warsangeli constitute 85% of the population while a section of Dhulbahante, mainly the Naleye Ahmed sub-lineage of the Mohamoud Garad live on the western side. An important surrounding area known as “Dooxadda Dureera” is also inhabited by the Bahogeyslabe of Warsangeli clans.
