= Godaalo =

- Town
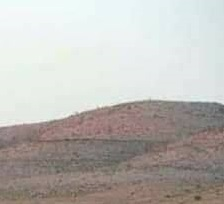
- Southern slope of Dulbiciid mountain in Godaalo

- Location in Somaliland. Godaalo (Somaliland)
- Coordinates: 9°5′21″N 47°55′26″E
- Country: Somaliland
- Region: Sool
- District: Xudun
- Time zone: UTC+3 (EAT)

Godaalo(God Alo) is a town in the eastern Sool region of Somalia/Somaliland.

On 13 December 2015, this town was part of conflict between the DNO ASA oil company and the local residents. Dulbiciid mountain in the environs of Godaalo, contains Somaliland tallest mountain outside the Karkaar range.

== Demographics ==
the city's main inhabitants are from the Dhulbahante clan, who hail from the Omar Wa'eys sub clan of the Mohamoud Garad tribe.

== See also ==
- Administrative divisions of Somaliland
- Regions of Somaliland
- Districts of Somaliland
- Somalia–Somaliland border
