= Fiqifuliye District =

- District
- Country: Somalia
- Region: Sanaag
- Capital: Erigavo
- Time zone: UTC+3 (EAT)

Fiqifuliye District is a district in the south Sanaag region of Somaliland. Its capital lies at Fiqifuliye.
