= Fiqifuliye =

- Town
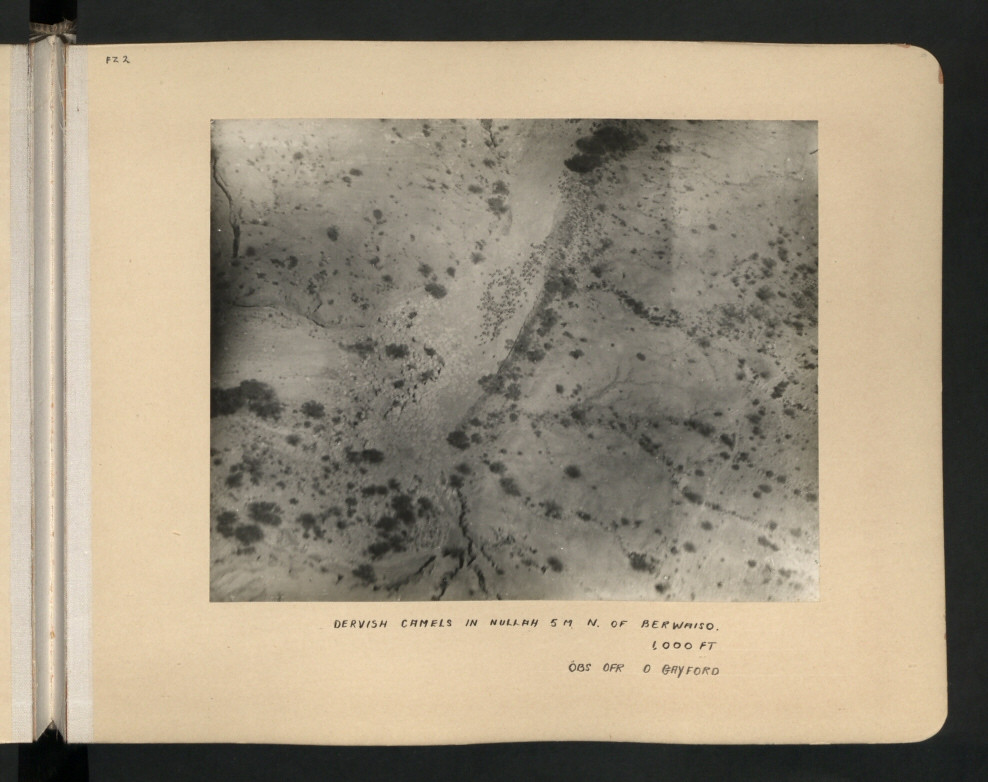
- Darawiish camels photographed aerially between Beerweyso and Fiqifuliye in 1919.

- Location in Somalia Fiqifuliye (Somalia)
- Coordinates: 10°01′35″N 47°46′52″E
- Country: Somalia
- Region: Sanaag
- Regional State: Khatumo
- District: Fiqifuliye District
- Elevation: 1,055 m (3,461 ft)

Population (2016)
  - Total: 3,800
- Time zone: UTC+3 (EAT)

Fiqifuliye is a town in the Fiqifuliye District of Sanaag region of Somalia.

== Recent History ==
On June 1, 1993, a meeting between the Habar Yoonis and the Dhulbahante clans was held in Fiqifuliye, and the Habar Yoonis clan agreed to invite the Dhulbahante clan to the upcoming clan meeting in Erigavo.

In July 2013, in Fiqifuliye, more than 600 militiamen who had previously been on the Khatumo State side announced that they would join the Somaliland army.

In March 2016, the Puntland Drought Relief Committee (based in Bosaso) dispatched a water truck as a first aid response to the drought around Fiqifuliye.

In December 2018, Somaliland's Sanaag Governor Maxamed Axmed Caalin (Tiimbaro) visited Fiqifuliye and promised to initiate government projects.

In October 2020, a hospital was fundeded in Fiqifuliye with donations from the diaspora. The Somaliland Ministry of Health is considering providing funding.

== Demographics ==
The city of Fiqifuliye is primarily inhabited by the Ugadhyahan Siyad-Mohamoud Garad branch of the Dhulbahante clan. The Naleye Ahmed sub-lineages are well represented there.

== See also ==
- Administrative divisions of Somaliland
- Regions of Somaliland
- Districts of Somaliland
- Somalia–Somaliland border
