= Hudun =

Hudun هودون
- Town
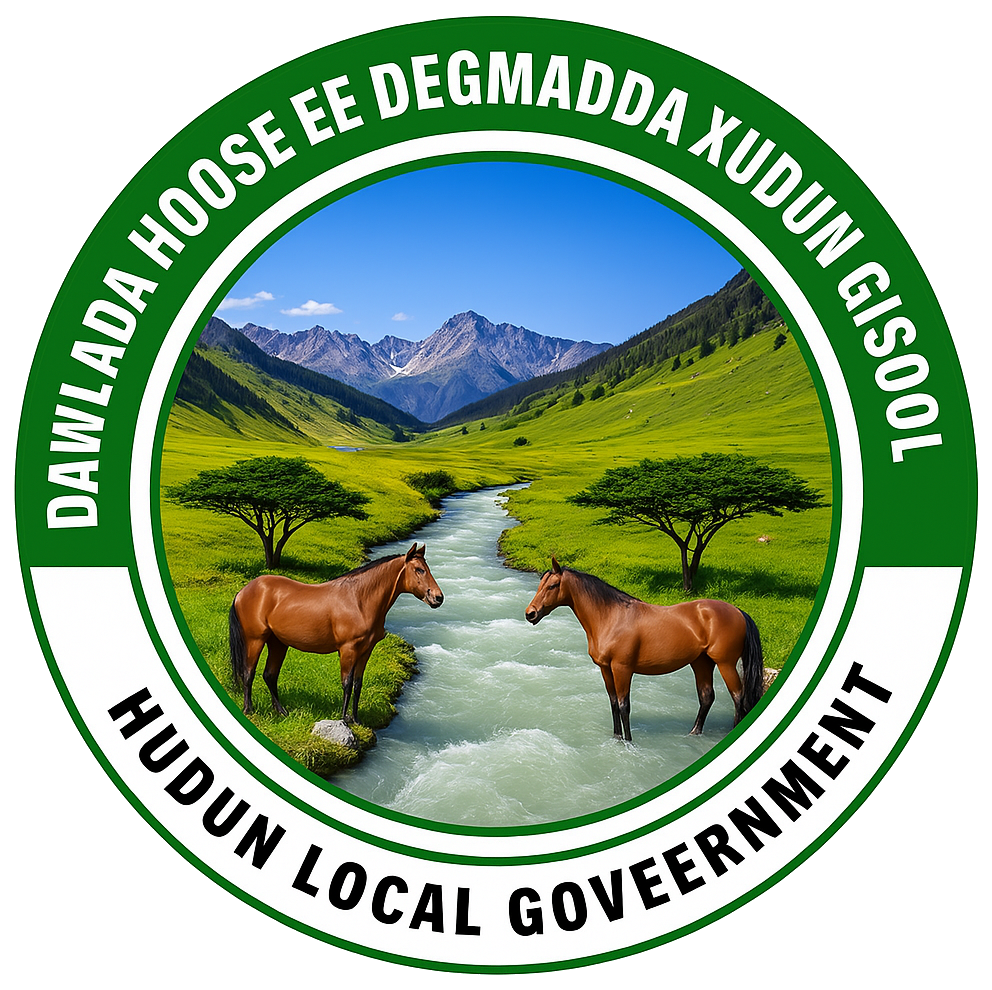
- Seal

- Location in Somalia
- Coordinates: 9°09′15.0″N 47°28′37.0″E
- Country: Somalia
- Regional State: Khatumo
- District: Hudun

Population (2007)
  - Total: 54,000
- Time zone: UTC+3 (EAT)

Hudun (Somali: Xudun) is a historical town in the northern Sool, region of Somalia, and the seat of the Hudun District. Khatumo has effectively controlled there since around 2023.

== Overview ==
Located in north west Somalia, Hudun lies 59 kilometres north by road from the provincial capital of Las Anod.

== Education ==
According to the Ministry of National Planning and Development in Somaliland, there are 9 primary schools and 1 secondary school in the Hudun District.

== History ==
On February 15, 1960, before Somaliland's independence, the first democratic elections were held in British Somaliland, and Ibrahim Eid was selected as the representative from Hudun.

The Somaliland government did not hold polls here during the 2005 Somaliland parliamentary election, citing Hudun as a disputed territory.

In March 2012, the militant group Al-Shabaab near Hudun was exterminated by Somali Federal Army and Ethiopian Army.

In November 2012, the president of Khatumo State declared victory in the battle against the Somaliland army in Hudun.

In January 2013, Khatumo militia based in southern Hudun were defeated and displaced by Somaliland forces. The captured militia were imprisoned in Burao.

In August 2017, the Somaliland government held a voting process for national elections in Hudun, which was opposed by Hudun residents as belonging to Puntland, and a clash took place between the Somaliland army and local forces in Hudun.

In May 2021, voter turnout in Hudun and other Dhulbahante clan-inhabited areas in the Somaliland parliamentary election was significantly higher than in the previous election in 2005.

== Notable residents ==
- Hassan Dahir Afqurac, Third Vice President of Puntland
- Ahmed Elmi Osman, Fifth Vice President of Puntland
- Hodan Nalayeh, Somali-Canadian social activist and entrepreneur. (1976–2019)

== Demographics ==
The City of Hudun is primarily populated by the Dhulbahante clan, with the Naleye Ahmed - Ugadhyahan sub-lineages of the Mohamoud Garad branch of the Dhulbahante clan are well-represented.
