= Erigavo District =

Erigavo District Degmada Ceerigaabo
- District
- Location of Erigavo District within Sanaag, Somaliland
- Country: Somaliland
- Region: Sanaag
- Capital: Erigavo

Population (2005)
  - Total: 114,846
- Time zone: UTC+3 (EAT)

Erigavo District (Somali: Degmada Ceerigaabo) is a district in the central Sanaag region of Somaliland. It is the largest and most populous district in Sanaag. Its capital lies at Erigavo.

== Towns and Villages ==
- Damala Hagare
- Maydh - An ancient port city.
- Yubbe - There is a Somaliland military base.
- Armale
- Guud Caanood
- Heis - A historic coastal town.
- Qaʽableh - Numerous archaeological sites and ancient tombs.
- Yufle
- Midhisho
- Fiqifuliye
- Gelweita - An archaeological site and a key rock art site.
- Dayaha
- Jidali
- Waqdariya - A coastal village.
