= Regions of Somaliland =

Regions of Somaliland Gobollada Somaliland (Somali) محافظات صوماليلاند (Arabic)
- Category: Unitary republic
- Location: Republic of Somaliland
- Created by: Constitution of Somaliland
- Number: 6
- Populations: 251,384 (Sahil) — 1,242,003 (Maroodi Jeex) (2014 estimates)
- Areas: 13,930 km^{2} (5,380 sq mi) (Sahil) – 54,231 km^{2} (20,939 sq mi) (Sanaag)
- Government: Regional government, national government
- Subdivisions: District

The regions of Somaliland (Somali: Gobolada Somaliland; Arabic: محافظات صوماليلاند) is divided into six administrative regions, Awdal, Sahil, Maroodi-Jeeh, Togdheer, Sanaag and Sool. These are in turn subdivided into twenty-two districts. Regions of Somaliland are the primary geographical divisions through which Somaliland is administered. A distinction is made between districts of grades A, B, C and D, with the classification being based on population, area, economy and production.

== Regions ==
Map	Region	Area (km^{2})	Capital	Districts
	Awdal	21,374	Borama	Baki District, Borama District, Zeila District, Lughaya District
	Sahil	13,930	Berbera	Sheikh District, Berbera District
	Maroodi Jeeh	17,429	Hargeisa	Gabiley District, Hargeisa District
	Togdheer	30,426	Burao	Oodweyne District, Buhoodle District, Burao District
	Sanaag	54,231	Erigavo	El Afweyn District, Erigavo District, Las Khorey District
	Sool	39,240	Las Anod	Aynabo District, Las Anod District, Taleh District, Hudun District

== History ==
=== British territory and independence era ===
The local administration of British Somaliland (1884-June 26, 1960) was stipulated primarily by the Local Government Ordinance of 1953. The ordinance established councils in six districts that had divided Somaliland since 1944. The ordinance continued to be used after independence as the State of Somaliland (June 26-July 1, 1960). At the time of the integration with Italian Somaliland on July 1, 1960, there were the following six districts.

- Berbera
- Borama
- Burao
- Erigavo
- Hargeisa
- Las Anod

The council (capital) was located in the city of the same name. These six areas were inherited by the regions established after the reindependence in 1991, and have a six-regionsystem with the six cities where the council was located as the capital.

Districts of British Somaliland and latter State of Somaliland

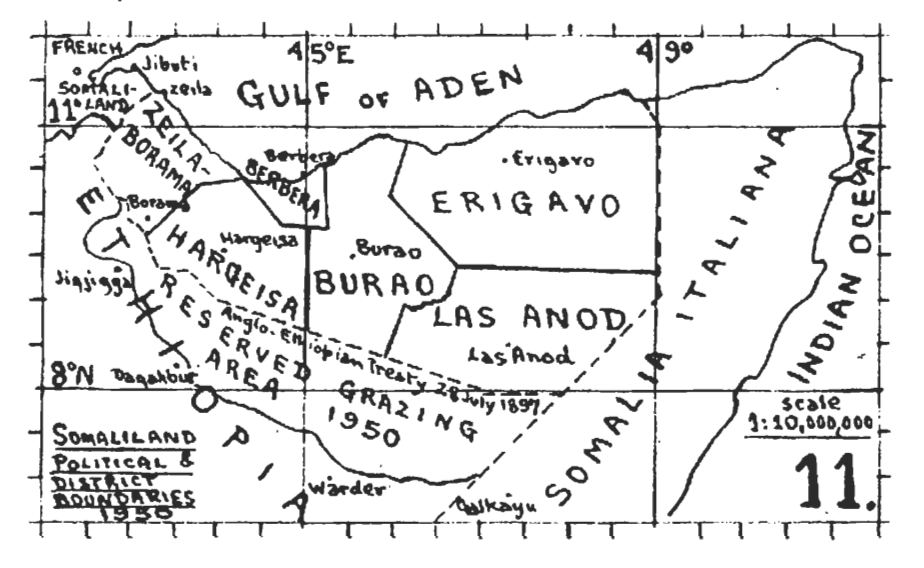

=== Union era ===
On July 1, 1960, the State of Somaliland annexed Italian Somaliland and became independent again as the Somali Republic. From then on, the former British territory is called the "northern region" and the former Italian territory with the capital Mogadishu is called the "southern region". On June 14, 1962, the six former British territories were reorganized into two states. The six districts that made up the former Italian territory have been transferred to the state as they are.

- Burao region (North East region): Erigavo, Burao and Las Anod merged. It has a population of 330,000 (estimated in 1961) and an area of 128,000 square kilometers.
- Hargeisa region (North West region): Berbera, Borama and Hargeisa districts merged. It has a population of 270,000 (same as above) and an area of 48,000 square kilometers.

Subsequently, the "Local Administration and Local Assembly Election Act" was enacted on August 14, 1963, and a district (District, different from that of the British territory) council was established. A decree governing region and district organization on February 8, 1967 established a two-tiered region-district structure.

On October 21, 1969, a military coup by Maj. Gen. Mohammed Siad Barre broke out. Barre, who seized power, placed all local governments, including regions and districts, under the direct control of the government under the "Local Government Reform Act" of June 8, 1972, and was a party under the decree of February 3, 1977. He established a local rule system based on dictatorship socialism. By 1982, the Barre administration had reorganized the regions of the country, and the two northern regions were divided into Woqooyi Galbeed, Togdheer, and Sanaag. In June 1984, Awdal was separated from Woqooyi Galbeed, and Sool was separated from Nugal (former Italian territory) (although there is a theory that the addition of these two regions was not implemented). .. During the Ogaden War (1977–1988), the same number of refugees as the population at that time (estimated at 1.3 million) rushed to the northern region, and the governing body was paralyzed.

Regions of Somali Republic between 1962-1969 and Regions of Somali Democratic Republic 1982-1991

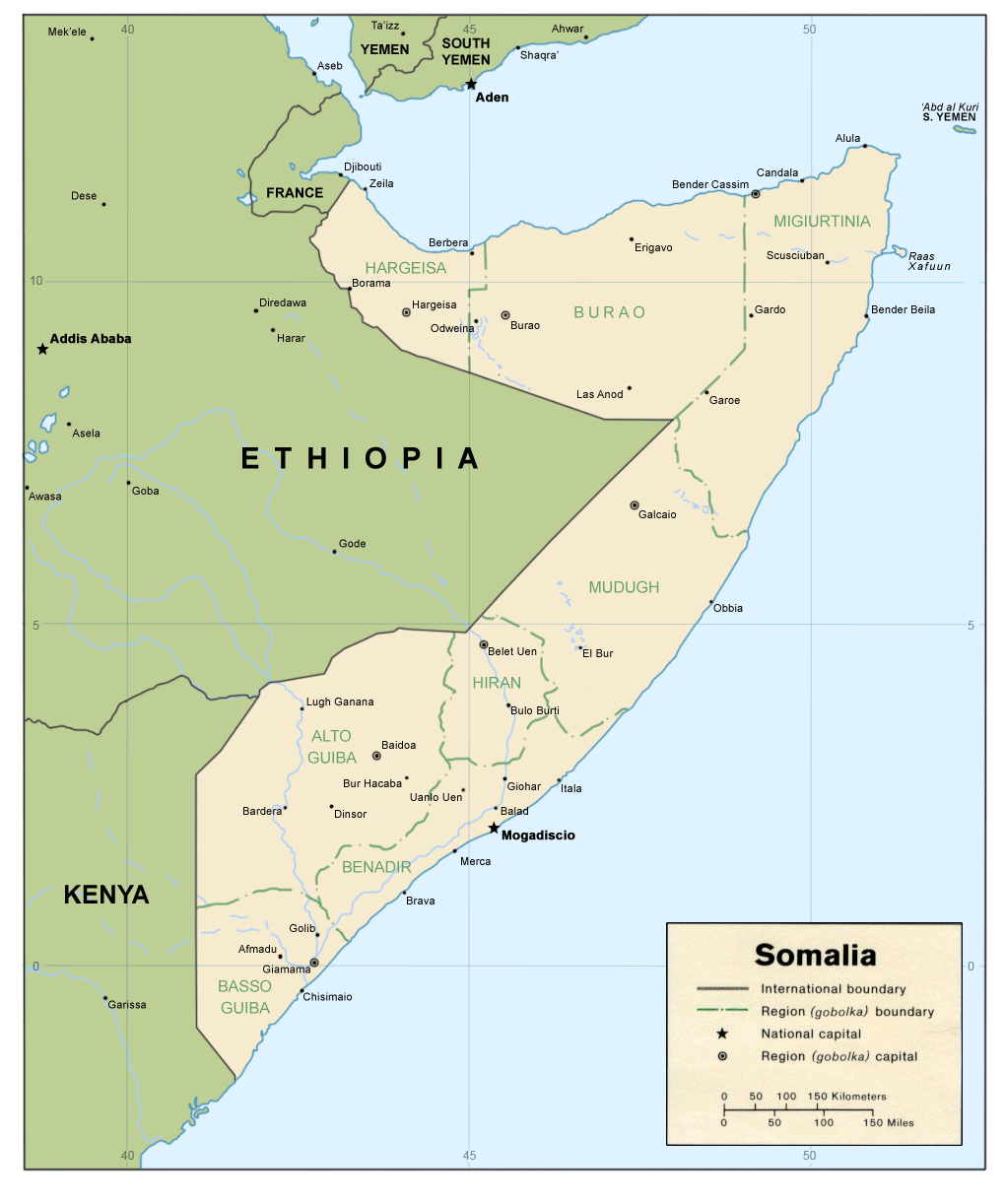
Administrative divisions of Somali Republic in 1969

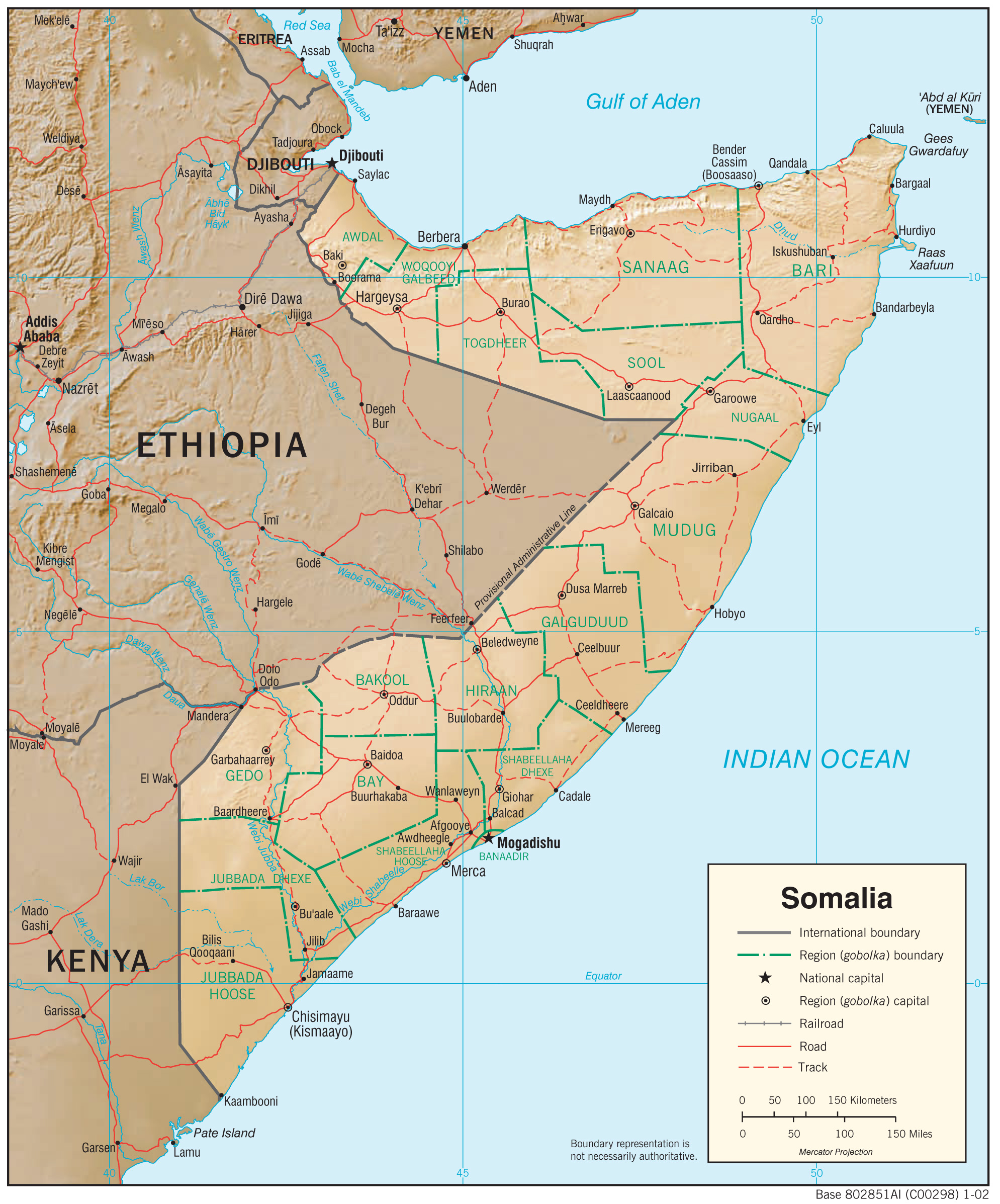
Administrative divisions of Somali Democratic Republic in 1991

=== Re-independence ===
The northern regions declared independence from Somali Democratic Republic after a 10 year long war of independence and restoration of sovereignty on May 18, 1991, and the Republic of Somaliland was established. According to the "Decrees Establishing the Structure of the Ministry of Interior and regions / Districts" in 1993, it was divided into 6 regions inherited from the era of Somaliland, 18 districts during the Somali era, and one district created by the Somaliland government, for a total of 19 districts. In addition, provincial assessments were carried out. Twenty-three districts were created by executive order after independence, but nearly all districts were not approved by Parliament for failing to meet district standards. By 1993, it was approved by Parliament and was incorporated into law only in Baligubadle District.

Berbera District in Woqooyi Galbeed became by executive order Sahil, and in 1998 the Sheikh District of Togdheer was incorporated into Sahil.

In 2007, The region of Woqooyi Galbeed was renamed to Maroodi Jeex (Chapter 1, Article 2 [23]. ]).

Regions of Somaliland between 1991-2008

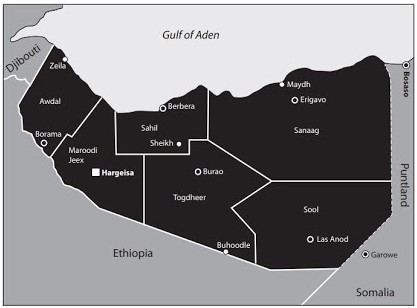
Administrative divisions of Republic of Somaliland in 1991

=== 2008–2014 ===
Between 22 March and 15 May 2008, then president of Somaliland Dahir Riyale Kahin issued a press statement announcing the creation of six new regions and 16 new districts, in addition to the corresponding administrative divisions already existing as created by Somalia's central government. On May 15, 2008, Kahin released a second statement declaring the Hawd the thirteenth region of Somaliland. In June 2014, Somaliland president Ahmed Mohamed Mohamoud (Ex-president) announced the creation of Somaliland's 14th region, consisting of 4 new districts. The new region, dubbed Haysimo was formed out of the eastern Sool and Sanaag regional districts. It contains the cities of Taleh, Sarmanyo, Godaalo, Hallin, and Aroley. The presidential decree stated that Taleh is the regional capital. 8 regions created by President Dahir rayale and Silanyo were not approved by parliament because the new regional boundaries are not clearly demarcated.

Regions of Somaliland in 2008 and 2014

Administrative divisions of Republic of Somaliland in 2008

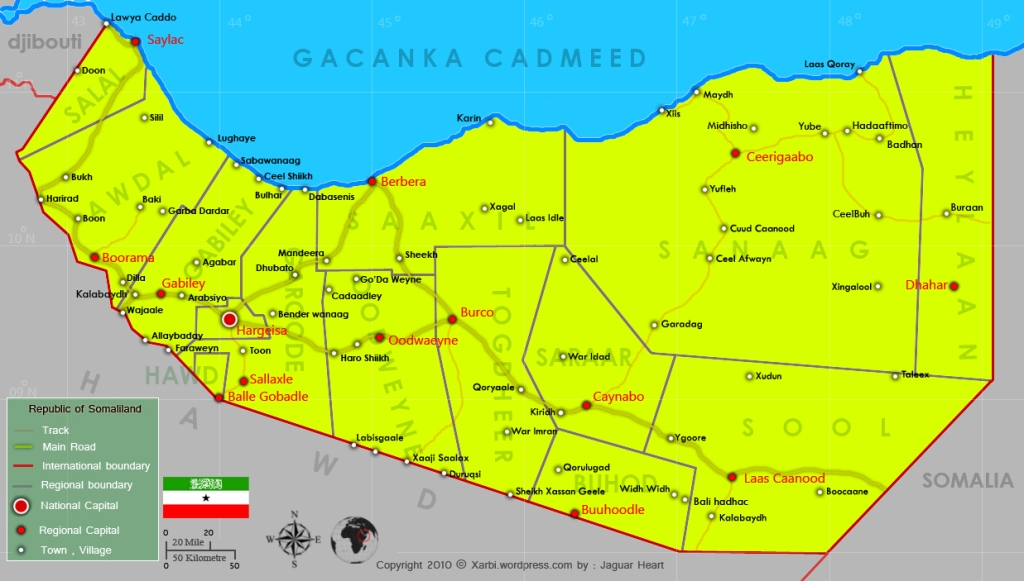
Administrative divisions of Republic of Somaliland in 2014

=== Current administrative divisions ===
Currently, Somaliland is divided in 6 regions, Awdal, Sahil, Maroodi-Jeeh, Toghdeer, Sanaag and Sool. This is in accordance with 2 political studies published on Somaliland in 2011 and 2015 and ActionAID, a humanitarian organization currently active in Somaliland.

In 2019 the local government law passed in 2019 (Lr. 23/2019, hereinafter referred to as the 2019 local government law), regions that "Somaliland is divided into six regions (Article 9 of the same law)". The 2019 Local Government Act came into force on January 4, 2020.

The regional boundaries are supposed to correspond to the boundaries of the six districts under the Somaliland protectorate, however the Siad Barre era boundaries serve as the de facto boundaries. Article 11, section 1 of the amended Local Government Act which came into force in 2020 provides:

Xuduudaha Lixda Gobol Ee JSL ka kooban tahay waxay ku salaysan yihiin Xuduudahii ay lahaan jireen lixdii Degmo Ee Waaweynaa Ee jiray xiligii Ingiriiska ka hor 26/06/1960 Ee kala ahaa Hargeysa, Burco, Ceerigaabo, Laascaanood, Boorama iyo Berbera kuwaas oo isku beddelay Gobolladda JSL hadda ka kooban tahay.

Regions of Somaliland

Current administrative divisions

== See also ==
- Administrative divisions of Somaliland
- Districts of Somaliland
- Somalia–Somaliland border
