= El Afweyn District =

El Afweyn District Degmada Ceelafweyn
- District
- Location of El Afweyn District within Sanaag, Somaliland
- Country: Somaliland
- Region: Sanaag
- Capital: El Afweyn

Population (2005)
  - Total: 65,797
- Time zone: UTC+3 (EAT)

El Afweyn District (Somali: Degmada Ceelafweyn) is a district in the Sanaag region of Somaliland. Its capital lies at El Afweyn.

== Population ==
The population in 2005 was 65,797 according to the OCHA survey.

== See also ==
- Administrative divisions of Somaliland
- Regions of Somaliland
- Districts of Somaliland
- Somalia–Somaliland border
