= El Afweyn =

Town in Sanaag, Somaliland

El Afweyn Ceelafweyn (Somali) عيل أفوين (Arabic)
- town
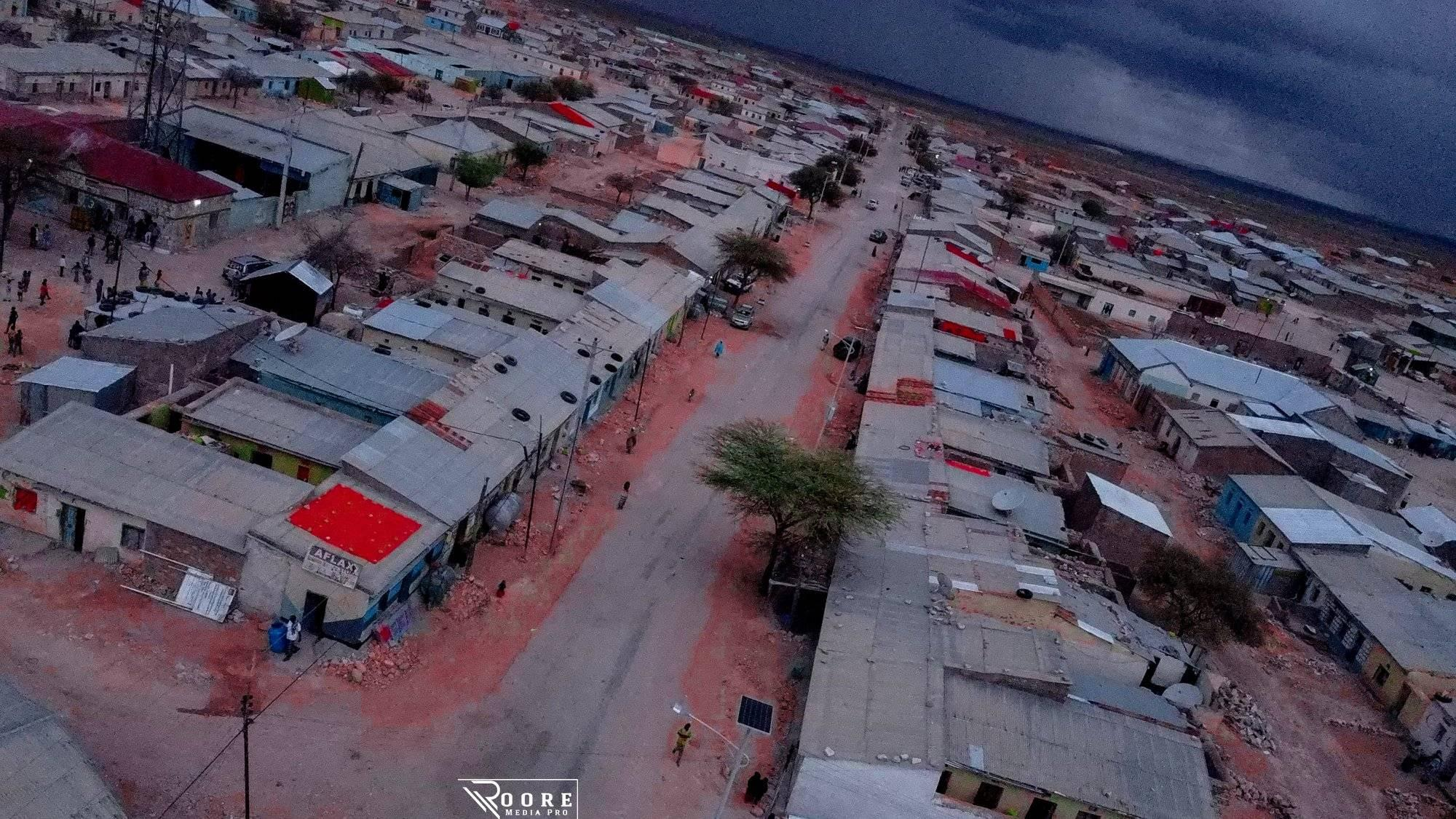

- Location in Somaliland El Afweyn (Somaliland)
- Coordinates: 9°55′45″N 47°13′2″E
- Country: Somaliland
- Region: Sanaag
- District: El Afweyn District

Government
  - Mayor: Mahamed Aden Digale Deputy mayor Mohamed Jama Liban

Population (2012)
  - Total: 60,000
  - Rank: 9th
- Time zone: UTC+3 (EAT)

El Afweyn (Somali: Ceelafweyn, Arabic: عيل أفوين) is a town in the Sanaag region of Somaliland.

El Afweyn is a major historical town in western Sanaag region and sits at the major road connecting the cities of Burao and Erigavo. By road, the town is approximately 283 km east of Burao and 88 km southwest of Erigavo.

The town is also the administrative seat of the El Afweyn District.

== History ==
=== Isaaq genocide ===
During the Isaaq genocide El Afweyn and its surrounding territory saw over 300 people be killed in October 1988 in revenge for the death of an army officer who was killed by a landmine laid by the rebel Somali National Movement (or the SNM for short). The town was also bombed by the Somali Air Force.

Oxfam Australia (formerly known as Community Aid Abroad) described the situation in El Afweyn as follows:

It is known that many people have fled from the town of Elafweyn following bombing attacks by the government forces. A "scorched earth" policy applied to the villages in the Elafweyn plains. These displaced people are hiding in the bush without adequate access to food and medical supplies.

In July 2000, El Afweyn was reported to be the most severely affected by flooding in the Sanaag region.

=== Security ===
Jama Ali Jama, who had temporarily assumed the presidency after expelling then Puntland president Abdullahi Yusuf from the capital Garowe in 2002, retreated to El Afwein after a heavy defeat in Dhuudo, Puntland in December 2002. The militia remained stationed in El Afwein, a town outside of Puntland's claimed jurisdiction, until early 2003 when both sides reconciled. Parts of the militia surrendered to Puntland forces in March 2003, with the militia itself withdrawing to Bosaso on April the same year.

In 2005, a settlement was reached between Osman Aw Mohamud (Buurmadow) and Axmed Cali Ducaale, who both claim to be Boqor (regional king). The House of Elders was also instrumental in this settlement.

=== Construction by Somaliland ===
Around 2010, security was stable, and the leader of the opposition Kulmiye Peace, Unity, and Development Party reportedly gave an election speech.

In 2012, the Somaliland government dug a 350-meter well, fully funded by the central government, to provide safe drinking water to more than 1,000 households.

=== Clan Struggle and Reconciliation ===
El Afweyn has been the site of a prolonged conflict that started in 2015 over grazing land, scarce water resources, and disputes over political power and influence between two resident communities.

The conflict was subsequently resolved in mid-July 2018 with the help of a Somaliland government led delegation from the Academy for Peace and Development (AFD). But as early as September, there was another deadly battle.

On 23 September 2018, the road between Erigavo and El Afweyn was opened.

On 5 November 2019, a peace deal between two rival clans was announced in El Afweyn.

On 27 May 2020, Somaliland's Ministry of Environment seized illegally logged timber in El Afweyn district and announced that the government would take control of the forest.

== Archaeology ==
The town of El Afweyn contains archeological sites in the form of pre-historical caves and rock-carvings. In 1972, a joint Somali-Soviet expedition arrived in El Afweyn to research these rock carvings. El Afweyn is also home to multiple cairns and the rock art site of God-Hardune near the town.

Near El Afweyn is the ruined Islamic city of Maduna, considered the most substantial and most accessible ruin of its type in Somaliland. The main feature of the ruined city includes a large rectangular mosque, its 3-metre high walls still standing and which include a mihrab and possibly several smaller arched niches. The mosque is surrounded by several old houses, most of whom being partially intact. The houses include roofed rooms, as well as compounds of dome-shaped structures lacking doors or windows. Just on a slope below the ruined city stands a baobab tree, large enough to suggest that it was planted while the city was inhabited.

Not much is known about Maduna's history, with its dry-stone architectural style suggesting that Maduna was a contemporary of other ruined cities in Somaliland like Amoud and Abasa, meaning that Maduna was presumably part of the Adal sultanate. Swedish-Somali archaeologist Sada Mire dates the ruined city to the 15th–17th centuries.

== Flora and fauna ==
El Afweyn is home to a diverse collection of flora and fauna, especially birds. Birds native to the town include the Blue-headed Wagtail, the White-winged Tern, the common migrant warbler, the Common Nightingale, the Squacco Heron, the Egyptian vulture, the Wattled Starling and the Lappet-faced Vulture.

== Economy ==
El Afweyn's economy is primarily based on the export of livestock. The town is home to the largest livestock markets in Sanaag region, and one of the largest in the Horn of Africa. The livestock market handles livestock from all corners of the Somali territories and generates a significant percentage of the town's income.

== Education ==
There are nine primary and secondary schools located in El Afweyn, including Aadan Abokor Qorsheel School and the Nugaal Primary and Intermediate School, God-Barwaaqo Primary School, Dhabar-mamac primary and intermediate school, among others.

== Demographics ==
As of 2012 El Afweyn has an estimated population of 60,000. It is mainly populated by the Habr Je'lo clan of the Isaaq clan-family, specifically the Bi'ide, and the Habar Yoonis sub-clan of the Garhajis Isaaq, specifically the Saad Yunis.

== Notable residents ==
- Bashir Abdi – Somali-Belgian athlete who won the bronze medal in the marathon at the 2020 Summer Olympics
- Mohammed Ahmed – Canadian long-distance runner. Ahmed won the silver medal at the 2020 Tokyo Olympics in the 5000m
