= Hudun District =

Hudun District Degmada Xudun
- District
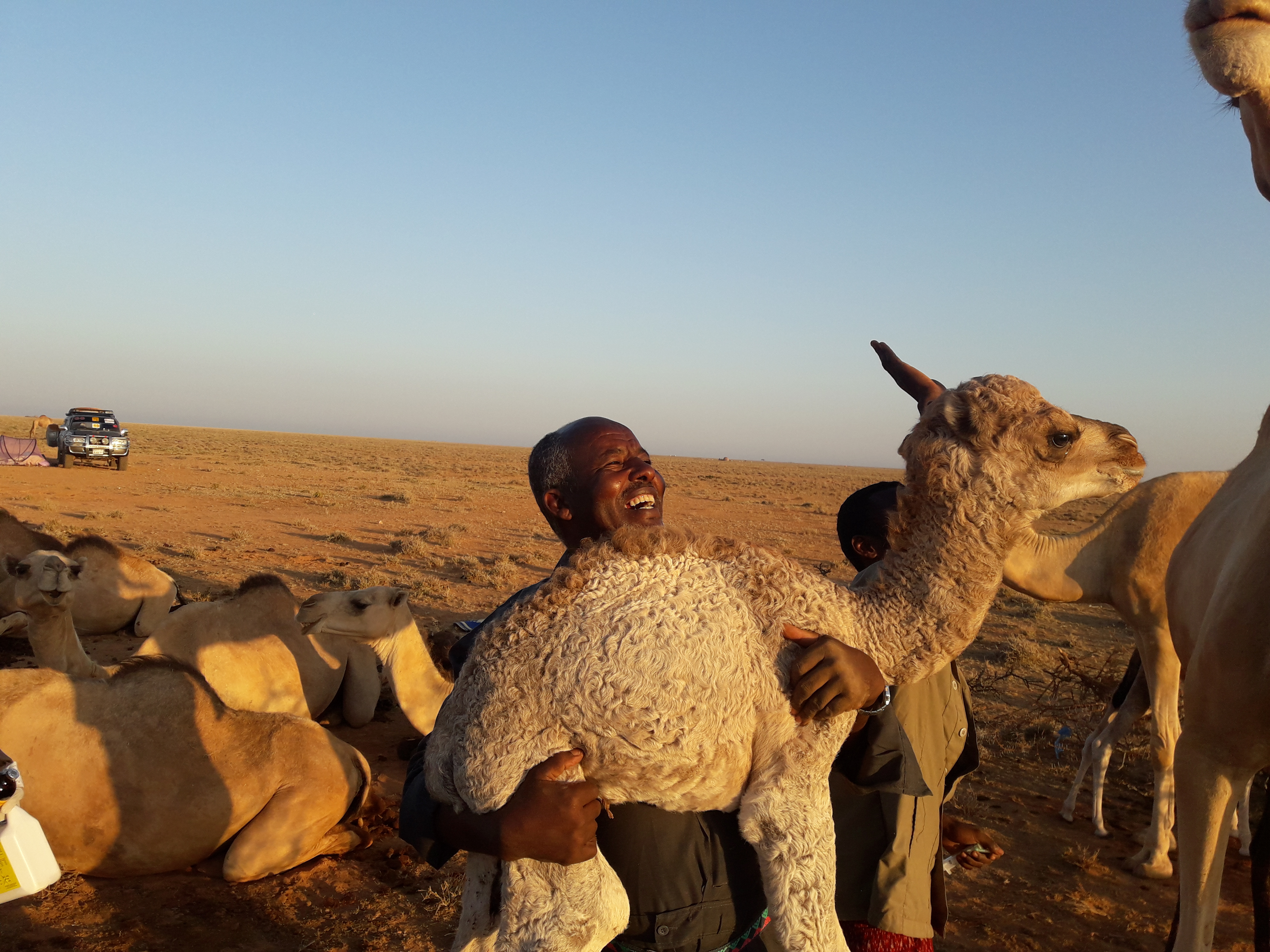
- A camel calf in Hudun District

- Location of Hudun district within Sool, Somalia

- Location in Somaliland
- Country: Somaliland
- Region: Sool
- Capital: Hudun

Population (2005)
  - Total: 18,785
- Time zone: UTC+3 (EAT)

Hudun District (Somali: Degmada Xudun) is a historical district in the Sool region of Somaliland Its capital lies at Hudun. The border between Hudun District and Las Anod District goes through the town of Buur Anod, also called Buur Caanood, a town that lies in between the towns of Dib Shabeel to the north, and Daryaha (Daryaha) to the south. This was the site of the largest battle between Dervish and colonial forces in 1904.

== See also ==
- Administrative divisions of Somalia
- Regions of Somalia
- Districts of Somalia
