= Sanaag =

Region of Somaliland and Puntland

Sanag Sanaag (Somali) سَنَاج (Arabic)
- Region
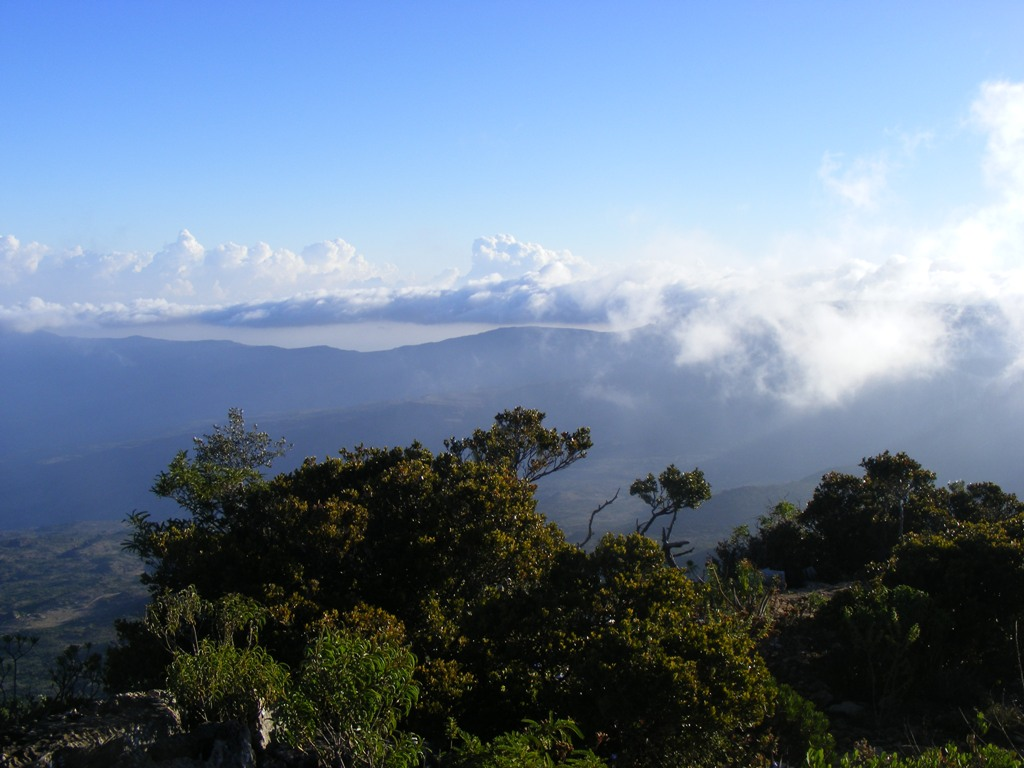
- Overview of the Cal Madow mountains in Sanaag

- Location in Somaliland
- Country: Somaliland Disputed with Puntland
- Administrative centre: Erigavo (Somaliland) Badhan (Puntland)

Government
  - Governor: Mahamed Elmi Hussein Ahmed

Area
  - Total: 54,231 km^{2} (20,939 sq mi)

Population (2022)
  - Total: 325,136
- IPC document listed number
- Time zone: UTC+3 (EAT)
- HDI (2021): 0.448 low · 3rd of 18

Sanag (Somali: Sanaag, Arabic: سَنَاج) is an administrative region (gobol) governed by both Somaliland and Puntland. The region is disputed between the self-declared Somaliland and Puntland, a state of Somalia. Puntland claims only the Harti-inhabited parts of region to be part of Somaliland, while the latter claims the entire region - a claim based on the British Somaliland boundaries.

Sanaag has a long coastline facing the Gulf of Aden to the north, and is bordered by the region of Sahil to the west, Sool to the south and Bari to the east. Its capital city is Erigavo. Sanaag is the largest region of Somaliland, accounting for 35% of Somaliland's total land area.

== Territorial dispute ==
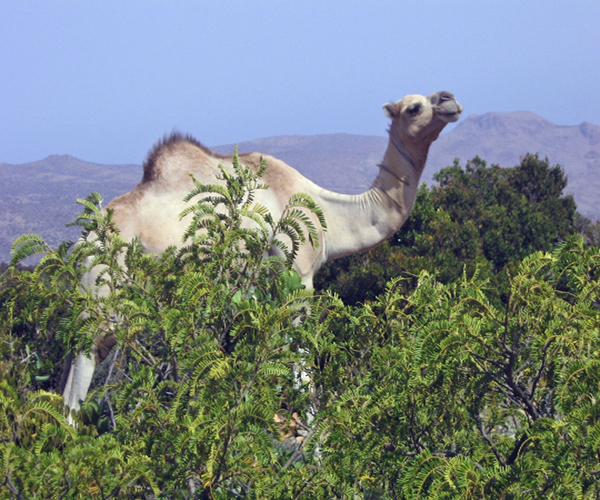
Camel in Almadow Forest

The Sanaag region is disputed between Somaliland and Puntland. Somaliland effectively controls the western and central parts of Sanaag. Puntland has effective control over Badhan and other areas in the east. Somaliland has declared its claim to all of Sanaag, but some areas (that it struggles to control) do not actually participate in Somaliland's elections.

== History ==
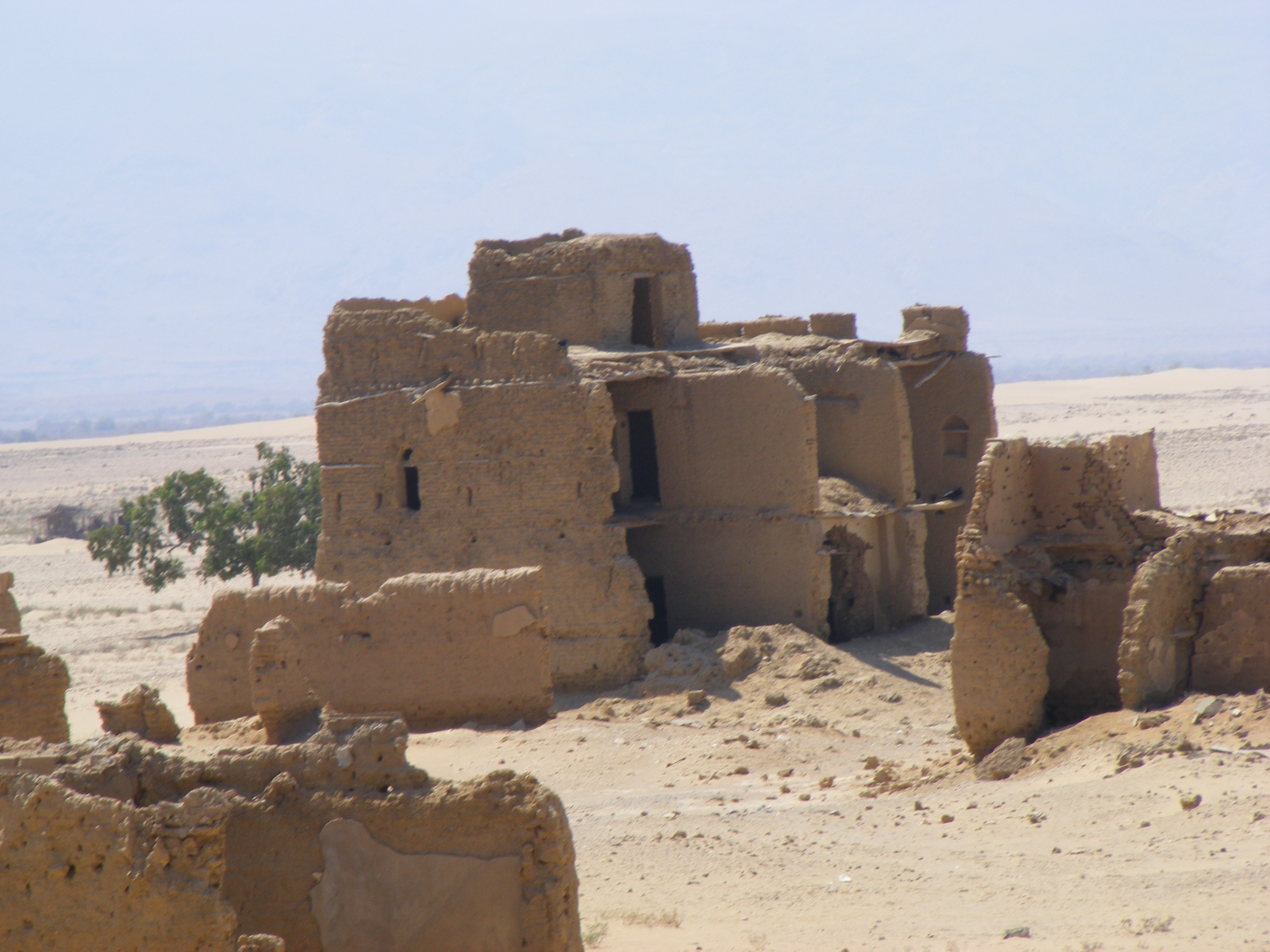
Ruins in Las Khorey

From 1944 to 1974, modern-day Sanaag region was one of three districts of the Burao region. The other two districts were Burao and Las Anod. Sanaag was carved out of Togdheer region and was established as a separate region on 23 June 1973, comprising the three districts of Erigavo, Las Qorey and Garadag.

Sanaag is home to numerous archaeological sites, with rock art, ancient ruins, buildings and cairns found at numerous sites, such as Gudmo Biyo Cas, Heis, Maydh, Haylan, Qa'ableh, Qombo'ul, Gelweita and El Ayo. However, many of these old structures have yet to be properly explored, a process which would help shed further light on local history and facilitate their preservation for posterity.

Sanaag is also home to the ruined Islamic city of Maduna near El Afweyn, which is considered the most substantial and most accessible ruin of its type in Somaliland. The main feature of the ruined city includes a large rectangular mosque, its 3 metre high walls still standing and which include a mihrab and possibly several smaller arched niches. Swedish-Somali archaeologist Sada Mire dates the ruined city to the 15th–17th centuries.

== Environment ==
A severe drought in the region in the early part of the 21st century caused an 80% or greater loss of livestock, though two good rainy seasons in 2004–2005 helped restore the area. Over a 15-year period of analysis, from 1988 to 2003, there was a 52% loss of forest and a 40% loss of grassland, and a 370% increase in bare land. Soil erosion due to weather and human activities and clearing of wood and brush for such uses as charcoal and fuel are issues leading to a degradation of the environment.

== Economy ==
In recent history, the Sanaag region normally maintained a diverse economy, producing and then exporting to other regions, it produced livestock, frankincense, and leather for export, this was happening while the region lacked basic infrastructure, but, after the outbreak of civil war the region's economy collapsed from loss of markets and dilapidated infrastructure has never helped, and lack of investment. Now the region only supports one main economy, livestock rearing. The Somali livestock ban imposed by Gulf countries in which was Sanaag's largest market has virtually destroyed the economy in the region, reducing purchasing power and forcing pastoralists in the region to survive on subsistence activities.

The region is connected to Burao, capital of Togdheer region as well as to the rest of the country through the Siilaanyo road.

== Demographics ==
The region is mainly inhabited by people from the Somali ethnic group, principally the Habr Yunis and Habar Jeclo sub-clans of the Isaaq and the Dhulbahante and Warsangali sub-divisions of the Harti Darod.

== Districts ==
Cities, towns and villages in Sanaag.

The region of Sanag is divided into 5 districts as follows:

- El Afweyn District
- Erigavo District
- Garadag District
- Badhan District
- Dhahar District

== Towns and Cities ==
- Erigavo
- El Afweyne
- Maydh
- Badhan
- Dararweyne
- Las Khorey
- Garadag
- Heis
- Midhisho
- Yubbe
- Hadaaftimo
- Hingalol
- Dhahar
- Buraan
- El Buh
- Gudmo Biyo Cas
- Ruguda
- Yufle
- Dayaha
- Guud Caanood

== See also ==
- Ogo Mountains
