= Las Anod conflict (2023) =

Armed conflict between Somaliland and unionist SSC-Khaatumo

- Part of the Somali Civil War (2009–present)
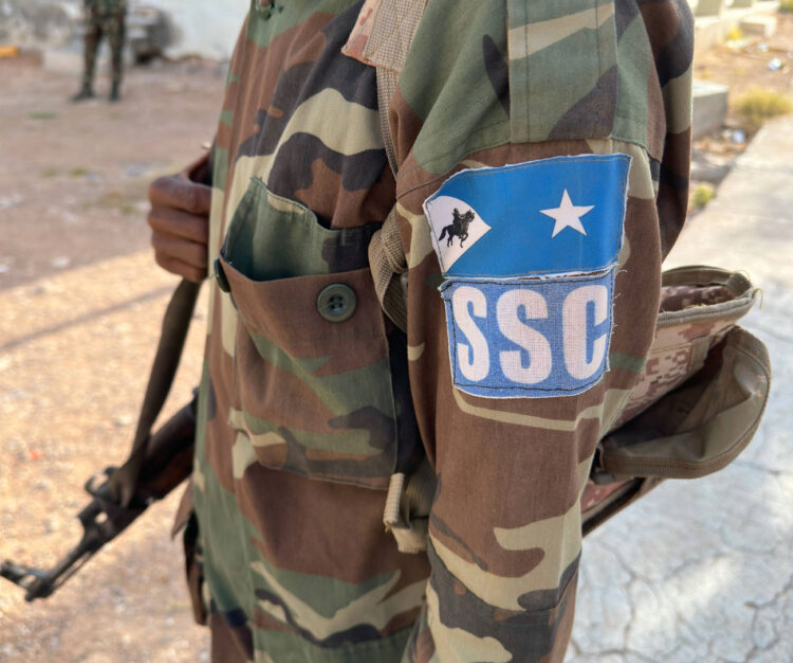
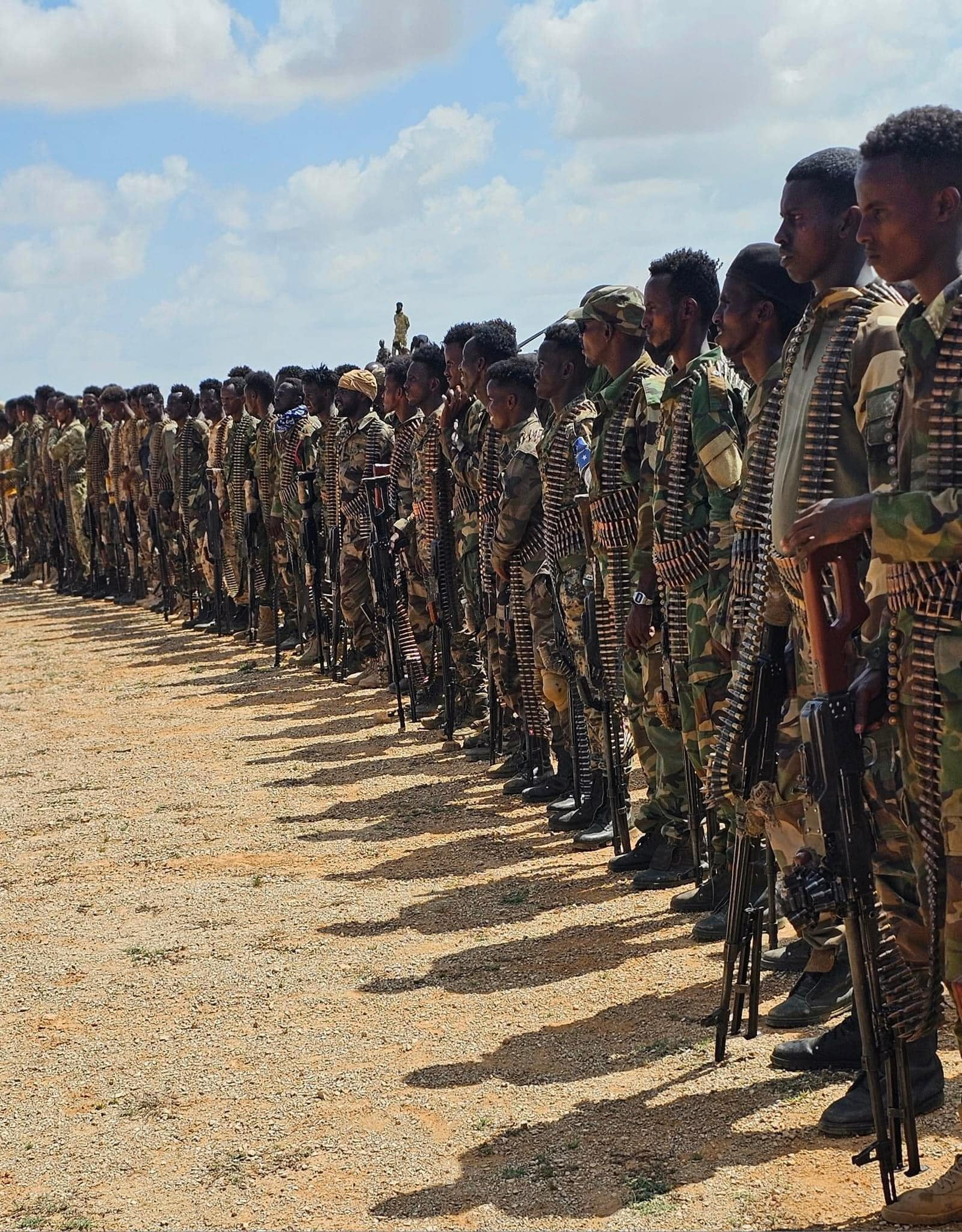
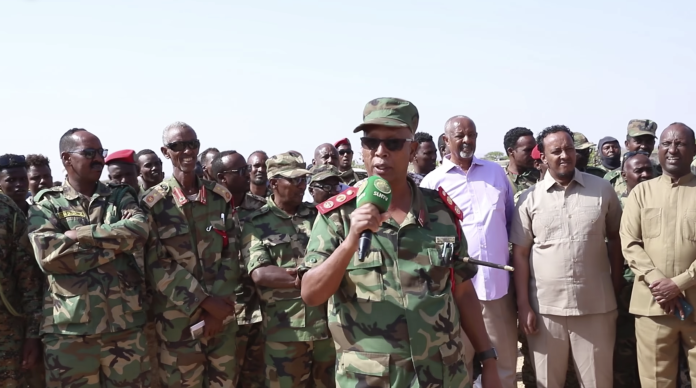
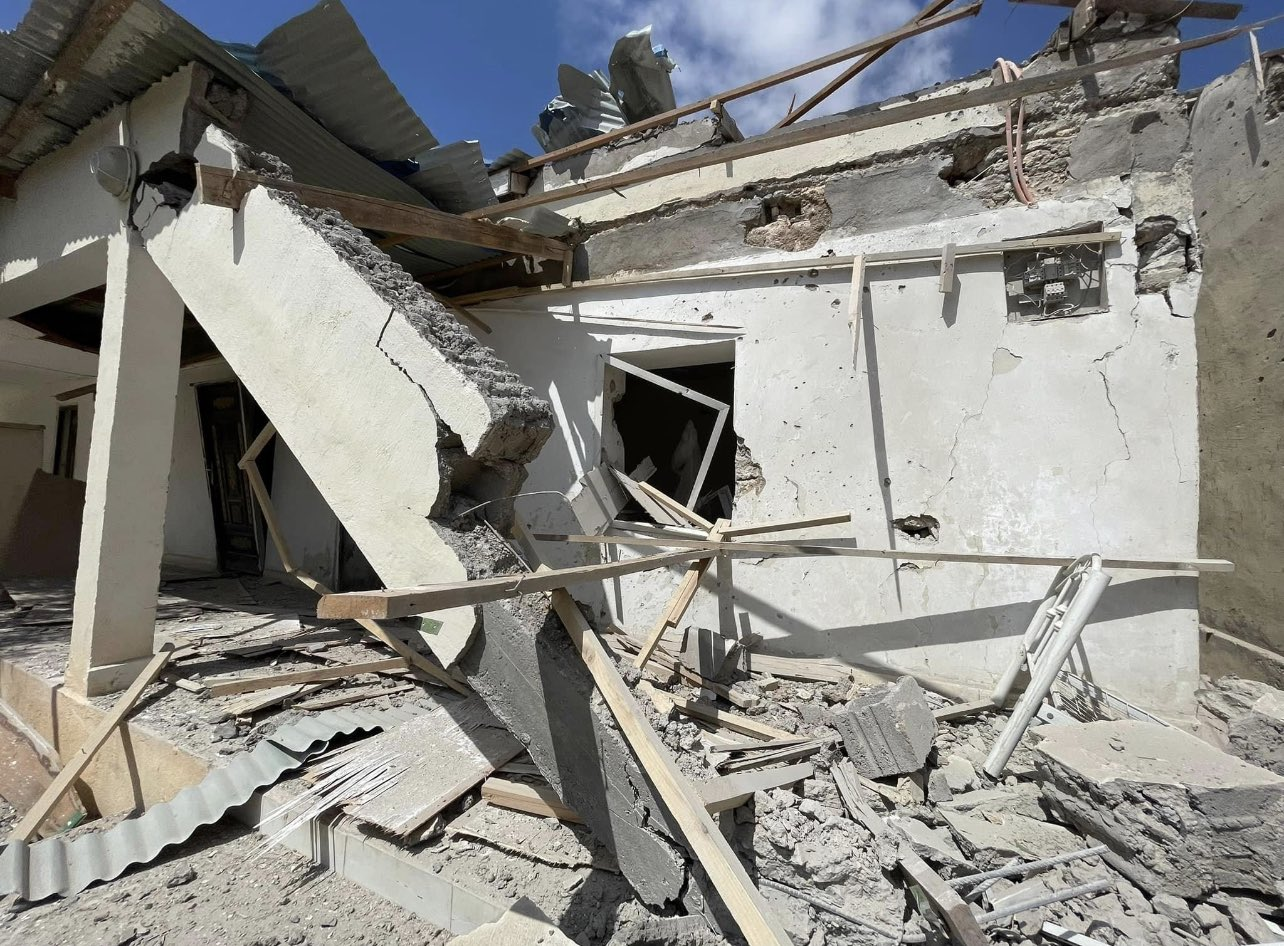
- Clockwise from top left: Uniform of SSC-Khatumo fighter; SSC forces standing to attention; Somaliland Army General Nuh Ismail Tani giving a speech during the war; Damage to Las Anod hospital from artillery fire; Map of the clashes
Date	6 February 2023 – 28 August 2023 (6 months, 3 weeks and 1 day)
Location	Sool, Sanaag and Buhodle regions
Result	Recognition of Khatumo State by Federal Government of Somalia; Spillover into Togdheer and Sanaag regions
Territorial changes	SSC-Khatumo troops capture 3 military bases and towns in the Las Anod District and Sool region.; Somaliland army withdraws 100km west from Las Anod

Belligerents
Somaliland	SSC-Khatumo; Somalia

Commanders and leaders
(Somaliland) Abdirahman Mohamed Abdullahi; (Somaliland) Muse Bihi Abdi; (Somaliland) Nuh Ismail Tani; (Somaliland) Nimcaan Yusuf Osman; (Somaliland) Faisal Bootaan (POW)	(Khatumo) Garad Jama Garad Ali; (Khatumo) Abdikhadir Ahmed Aw-Ali; (Somalia) Hassan Sheikh Mohamud; (Somalia) Hamza Abdi Barre

Units involved
Somaliland Armed Forces; Somaliland National Army; SSB Civil Force	SSC-Khatumo troops

Strength
6,000–8,000 army 1,000–2,000 police 6,000 SSB militia (2025)	7,000–8,000

Casualties and losses
2,000 casualties (May 2023 estimate)	Unknown
- ~343 people dead (March 2023); 154,000–203,000 civilians displaced 600 wounded

The Las Anod conflict (Somali: Dagaalkii Laascaanood) was an armed conflict between Somaliland and Khaatumo SSC (Sool, Sanaag and Cayn regions) forces of the Dhulbahante clan around Las Anod, the capital of the Sool region.

Local tensions escalated in late 2022 following the assassination of civil leaders in Las Anod, culminating in fighting that erupted on 6 February 2023 after Somaliland security forces violently cracked down on civilian protests. Shortly after, the supreme Garad of the Dhulbahante clan, Jama Garad Ali, announced the intent of the SSC-Khaatumo administration to reunify with the Federal Government of Somalia (FGS). Las Anod fell into a state of siege, with heavy fighting between SSC and Somaliland forces. Under President Muse Bihi, the Somaliland National Army initiated a prolonged military campaign, including six months of artillery bombardments aimed at subduing the city. Amnesty International reported indiscriminate shelling by Somaliland forces, which damaged schools, mosques, and hospitals, while also killing and injuring civilians.

The conflict has resulted in the deaths of several hundred civilians and displaced 153,000–203,000 as refugees. It is not known how many have been killed in total. Many residents fled to neighboring SSC-Khatumo territories or to Puntland. The conflict has weakened Somaliland's bid for international recognition, as the war and mass displacement have tarnished its image as a stable political entity.

In August 2023, the Somaliland National Army was compelled to retreat from the environs of Las Anod after being routed during the battle of Goojacade, following which SSC forces declared a cessation of hostilities. SSC-Khatumo was recognized two months later as an interim administration by the FGS. Somaliland has vowed to reclaim the region, and a military stalemate presently holds between SSC troops and the Somaliland National Army on a front line 100km from Las Anod. The conflict has also sparked fears of similar uprisings in other Somaliland regions with strong unionist leanings, such as Awdal in the west.

== Background ==
Following the Somali Rebellion and the full outbreak of the Somali Civil War in 1991, Somaliland declared an independent state in 1991 within the borders of the former British Somaliland. While Somaliland was dominated by the Isaaq clan, the Dhulbahante clan populates the east of this territory – primarily in the Sool, Sanaag and Cayn regions. The Dhulbahante were opposed to the attempt to secede from Somalia and did not fully participate in Somaliland elections in protest. Ideologically, the Dhulbahante were near unanimous in their rejection of secession. In 2003, Las Anod came under the control of the unionist Puntland state.

During October 2007, the Somaliland army took over the city during the Battle of Las Anod against Puntland forces. After coming under control of Somaliland, the Dhulbahante residents of the city experienced insecurity. In particular, the Raad Peace Research Institute in Mogadishu reported that this control led to "extreme political, economic, and social marginalization and subjugation of the Dhulbahante clan," including the assassinations of more than 120 prominent community leaders and clan elites.

In the 2020s, tensions began to build between the local Dhulbahante population and the ruling Isaaq elite in Hargeisa. The establishment of a water plant was hindered by the Somaliland government and several hundred traders in Las Anod from southern Somalia were expelled. The traders were largely from the Rahanweyn clan, which the Somaliland government vilified as being associated with Al-Shabaab. The Dhulbahante population interpreted the expulsions as an effort to undermine Las Anod's economic growth considering the Rahanweyn were an important trading community.

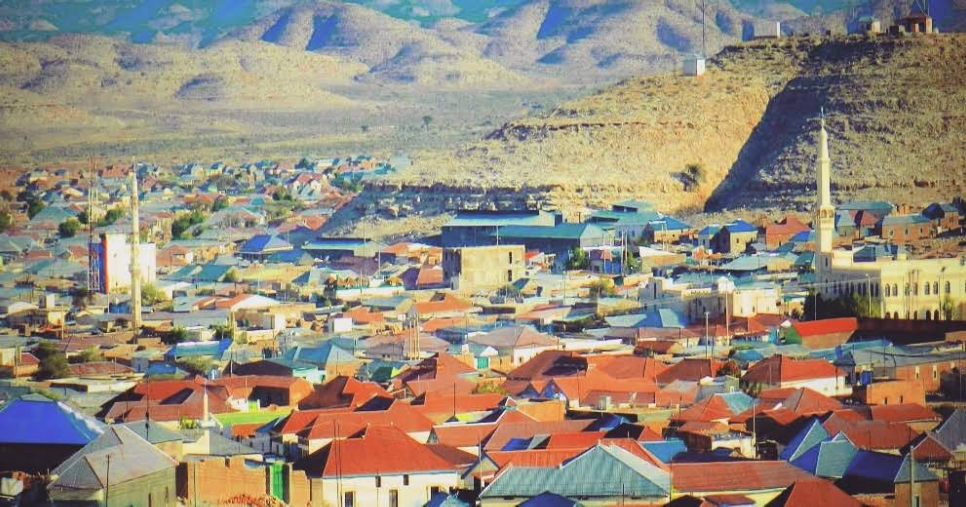
Las Anod

=== Assassinations and civil demonstrations ===
The conflict was effectively ignited by the assassination of popular opposition politician Abdifatah Abdullahi Abdi who was shot after he left a mosque. After his murder, students took to the streets, protesting against the Somaliland government who they believed responsible for the killing. Somaliland police fired live ammunition and gunned down protesters, killing more than twenty people and sending shockwaves through the community. Cellphone footage of the killings rapidly proliferated abroad via Facebook and WhatsApp. Local clan militias began organizing to retaliate. In December 2022, civil demonstrations against the Somaliland government and unrest began to spread northwest across the Sool region, from Taleh to Kalabaydh, Hudun, Boocame and Tukaraq. Somaliland troops withdrew from the city to their Sool outposts and encircled the city.

Following mass protest that continued from December into January 2023, the withdrawal of the Somaliland troops paved the way for the return of the supreme Garad of Dhulbahante, Garad Jama Garad Ali – a community leader exiled from Las Anod since 2007. Rumor spread of a grand meeting of all Dhulbahante clan elders, followed by speculation that the elders would vote to exile Somaliland security forces from the city.

== History ==
Before the war had started, most Dhulbahante commanders and their troops serving in the Somaliland security forces had already quit or deserted. Before the fighting had broken out around 4,000 trained troops and their equipment defected. In February 2023 local leaders in Las Anod declared that they would “never accept or participate in Somaliland's separatist programme” and announced their allegiance to Somalia.

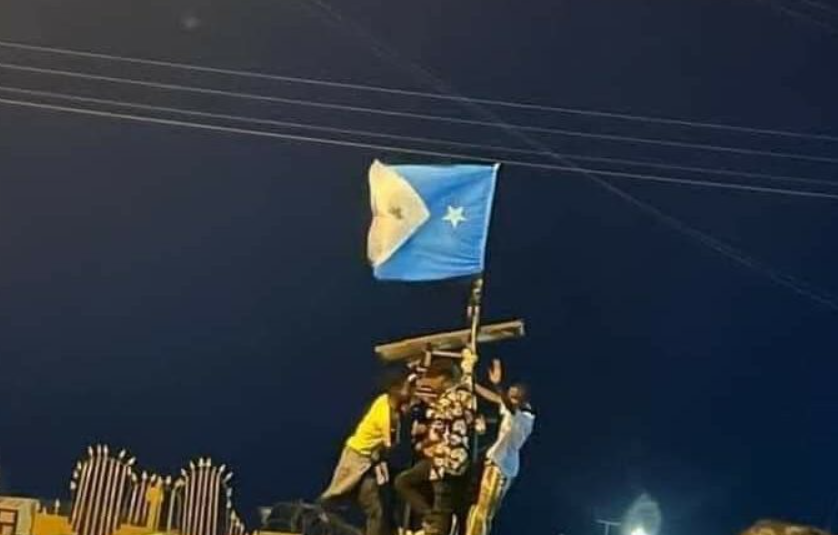
Khatumo flag being raised over Las Anod during protests

=== Declaration of independence ===
6 February 2023 was a decisive moment in the conflict. A declaration of independence was uploaded on social media stating the regions of Sool, Sanaag and Cayn rejected the rule of Somaliland. Rejecting the rule of both the secessionist Somaliland and the unionist Puntland governments, the Dhulbahante clan elders declared their intent to form a state named "SSC-Khatumo" within the framework of the Federal Government of Somalia.

==== Outbreak of war ====
Somaliland armed forces had assumed they could capture the city in a single day. At 6 am Somaliland forces stationed north of Las Anod began shelling the city. Fighting broke out in Las Anod between Somaliland troops and Dhulbahante militias in the Sayadka Hill suburb, with shots heard in the streets surrounding Hamdi Hotel where Somaliland dignitaries were staying. The fighting on the first day of the war was centered on Hotel Hamadi in the east of the city, and by the days end the Somaliland representatives and their forces who had still been present were driven out.

On the first day of fighting 34 people were killed and 164 were injured during the Somaliland army bombardment of the city. Tens of thousands of residents fled the city and became internally displaced persons. The majority of businesses in Las Anod closed and most residents became unemployed. The towns economy collapsed as residents fled artillery shelling.

=== Battle for Las Anod ===
For nearly 20 days SSC and Somaliland forces clashed on the outskirts of Las Anod, engaging in house-to-house combat. As a result of artillery usage by both sides and the ferocity of the battle, around 150,000 people fled the city. Las Anod fell into a state of siege. A force of around 7,000 to 8,000 SSC fighters was raised to defend the city and its environs, many of whom were from the Dhulbahante clan.

=== Escalation of fighting ===
During the first weeks of armed clashes, Somaliland forces stationed at the nearby base of Gojacade cut the water supply to Las Anod. A water shortage ensued in the city that significantly impact both the civilian population and the fighters present.

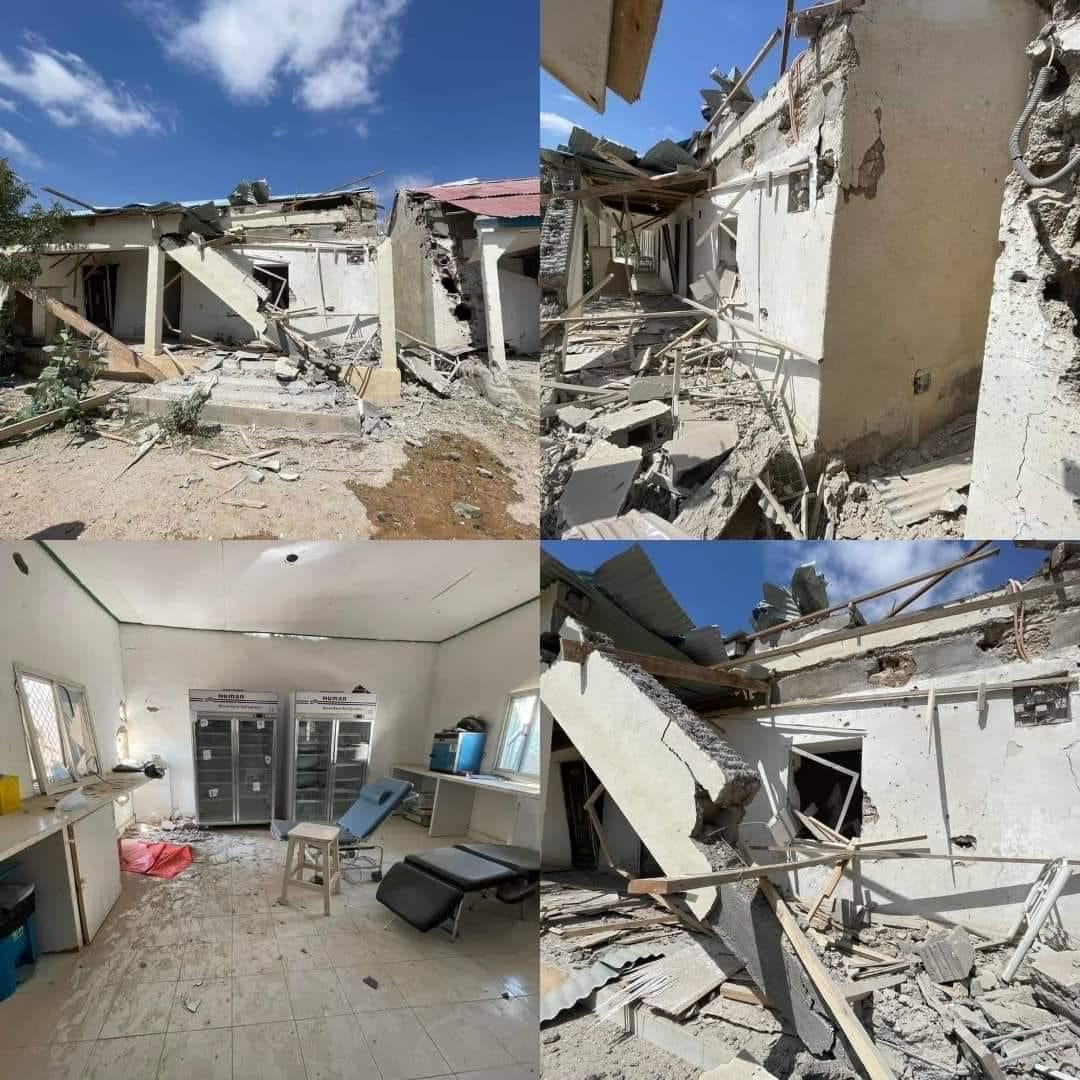
Damage to Laascaanood hospital as a result of Somaliland army artillery shelling on the city during late Feb. 2023

On 8 February, the supreme Garad of Dhulbahante, Garad Jama Garad Ali, accused the Somaliland government of genocide, called for peace and declared Las Anod's intent to self-determination and be governed from Mogadishu under the Federal Government of Somalia. Many analysts and locals viewed Somaliland President Muse Bihi as the driver of violence. Hate speech against the Dhulbahante clan, largely inspired by Bihi, was widely spread on social media.

That month several heavy battles occurred when Somaliland forces attempted to overrun SSC forces defending Las Anod. Throughout February, the Somaliland army bombarded the city with rifle fire and artillery. After failing to take the city during a fierce battle on 25 February 2024, all Somaliland army units stationed in eastern Sool region were dispatched to the military base of Gojacade as reinforcements. The fighting killed 145 and injured 1080 according to public hospital director Abdimajid Sugulle. 90% of Lasanod residents were displaced, and the region produced 185,000 internally displaced people and 60,000 refugees within the first month of fighting. Two weeks later on March 7th, the UNHCR reported some 100,000 refugees from Las Anod in the Dollo Zone of Ethiopia.

Until the end of February 2024, the fighting was between the Somaliland army and the local Dhulbahante clan. Among the clans' fighters were professional soldiers who had defected from the Somaliland army and others had taken leave from the Puntland army or from the Somali National Army to join the fighting. The vast majority of defectors from the Somaliland army and other volunteers were natives of Las Anod and the surrounding countryside. A number of fellow Harti-Darod (including Warsangali, Dashiishe & Majeerteen) clans announced their support for the Las Anod Dhulbahante. The Dhulbahante are receiving money, equipment and fighters from their allies.

=== Bombardment of Las Anod (March – August 2023) ===
The Somaliland army deployed approximately 28 guuto (battalions) comprising 200 to 400 men around Las Anod during this period, supplemented by over a thousand armed police forces. In total Somaliland forces deployed 6,000 to 8,000 troops for the operation. On 2 March, the mayor of Las Anod reported that Somaliland forces were bombing public buildings from the surrounding countryside including government institutions and hospitals. The UN also reported a casualty count of over 200 deaths. On March 16, Somaliland troops were reported to be shelling civilians from the surrounding area. After Ethiopia requested the Somaliland army ease the bombardment, artillery shelling ceased for a time. Somaliland security forces arrested protestors who had demonstrated in other parts of the region in support of the SSC fighters. Due to fighting with Al-Shabaab and pressure from the Dhulbahante, both the regional Puntland government and the federal Somali government have effectively stayed out of the dispute. On 26 March 2023, Somaliland forces launched a major three-pronged offensive on Las Anod but failed to make any headway after fierce fighting. Their forces reportedly sustained heavy casualties. Another offensive was attempted on 31 March but also failed.

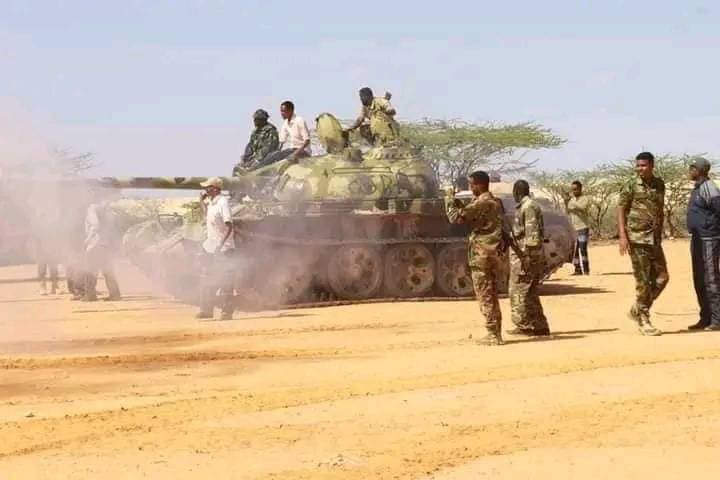
SSC-Khaatumo tank facing Somaliland forces in the east of Las Anod

Seasonal rains which began during March and grew heavier in April dampened the fighting. During April 2023, the fighting began to stall and became highly sporadic. By May 2023, the five hospitals in the city recorded 373 killed and 2311 injured among the local population. On 7 June, the UN Security Council released a statement reaffirming its full respect for the sovereignty, territorial integrity, political independence, and unity of Somalia. They also stated, "The members of the Security Council called for the immediate withdrawal of 'Somaliland' security forces and urged all parties to exercise restraint, refrain from provocative actions, incitement to violence, and inflammatory rhetoric. This is in order to de-escalate the situation on the ground, rebuild trust, and create the conditions for peace." The following day, the Somaliland Ministry of Foreign Affairs released a statement expressing their view that the UNSC was "misinformed about the facts on the ground." On 11 July, Somaliland troops were reported to have shelled health facilities and public infrastructure in Las Anod, destroying 2 ambulances and causing dozens of casualties (including healthcare workers and patients). The World Health Organization published a press release condemning the attack on the facility and the shelling of hospitals. In response, the Somaliland Ministry of Foreign Affairs described the statement as "disturbing" and claimed that they were fighting clan militias and Al-Shabaab terrorists, to ensure "that those in need have access to these services and other humanitarian assistance".

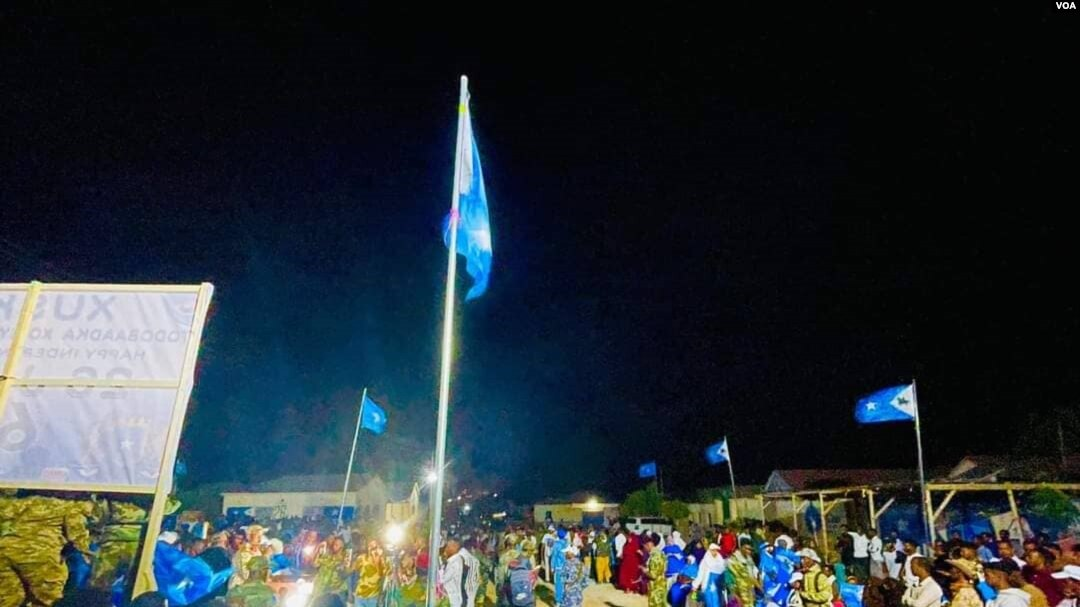
SSC-Khatumo holds Independence Day celebration in Las Anod

By early August, the conflict had come to a stalemate. Around 20,000 fighters were involved. On 16 August, famous Somali traditional poet Abwan Jama Kadiye was reportedly killed by a mortar shelling in Las Anod. Both Somaliland and SCC-Khatumo blamed each other for his death. The loss of a respected poet and community member sparked outrage among the residents of Khatumo and Somalia. Some individuals within Khatumo even expressed a desire for justice and retribution in response to the incident. They indicated a potential intent to take revenge on Somaliland, given their suspicions.

=== Fall of Gojacade and Maraaga bases (August 2023) ===
On August 25, SCC-Khatumo forces launched an attack on Somaliland forces on the outskirts of Las Anod, capturing two bases held by the Somaliland Army in Maraaga and Goojacade. After the unexpected defeat, the Somaliland forces fled, regrouping to Dhodida in the northwest. SSC-Khatumo claimed this advance also resulted in the capture of Dhuxun, Xargega, Golayeedhay, Canjiid, Adhi'adeye, Samakaab, Yagoori, Wadhake, and Guumays and their respective military bases. Additionally, they claimed to have captured a substantial amount of military equipment, including several T-54/T-55 tanks, multiple ZU-23-2 anti-aircraft autocannons, eight Fiat CM6614 vehicles, at least one BM-21 multiple rocket launcher, and various undisclosed military assets. They also claimed a significant quantity of weaponry was neutralized during this operation, as well as the commander of Somaliland Army's 12th division.

The Economist reported that the Somaliland army suffered a "humiliating defeat" as a result of the war. President Muse Bihi was criticized by many for engaging in a crackdown instead of coming to a compromise. Hundreds of Somaliland troops were taken as prisoners of war by SSC forces. In the aftermath of the offensive, the Somaliland Ministry of Defense released a statement stating that its army withdrew from their positions in the eastern part of the Sool region for "strategic military purposes and is in the phase of reorganizing and preparing to counter the enemy." Somaliland added that some of its forces are missing after encountering difficulties in reaching their intended destinations.

==== Cessation of hostilities ====
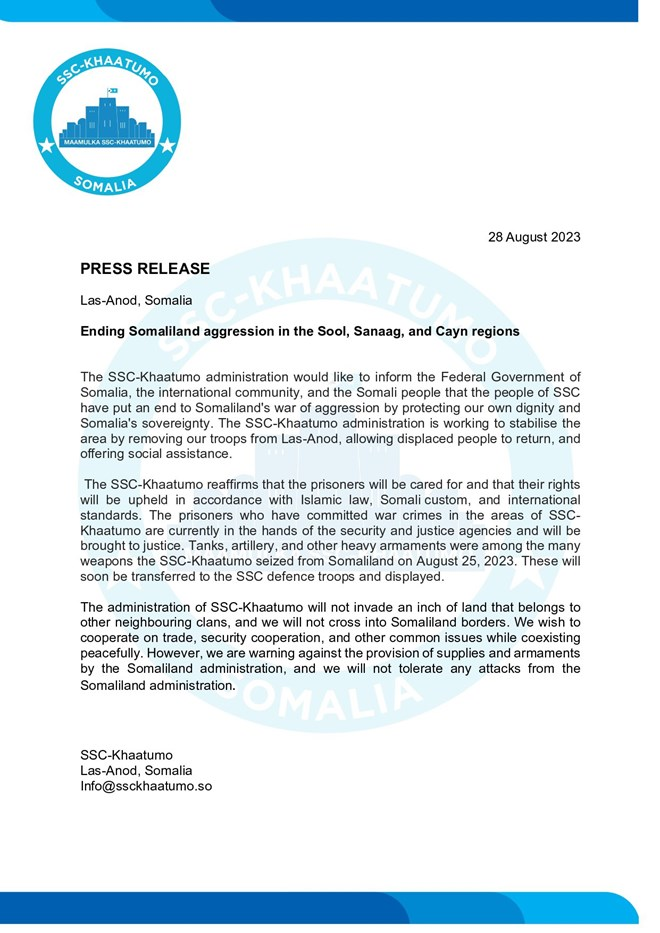
SSC press release announcing the end of fighting on 28 August 2023

Following their victory at Gojacade, the SSC-Khatumo administration announced on 28 August 2023, the end of eight months of conflict in the Sool, Sanaag, and Cayn regions. They informed the Federal Government of Somalia, the international community, and the Somali people that the SSC had halted what they referred to as "Somaliland's war of aggression." The administration also stated that it had taken proactive measures to restore stability in the region. These efforts include a strategic withdrawal of forces from Las Anod, facilitating the return of displaced individuals, and launching social support programs. They further assured that detainees would be treated properly, with their rights respected in line with Islamic law, Somali traditions, and international standards.

Following the capture of the Goojacade army base by SSC-Khatumo, in Fall 2023 the frontline shifted to western Sool, emerging between the villages of Oog and Guumays. According to the Crisis Group, this division roughly corresponded to boundaries between Isaaq and Dhulbahante clans. In September both sides sent reinforcements to the area, raising fears of further clashes, but the new front line remained quiet.

=== SSC consolidation and Somaliland military build up ===
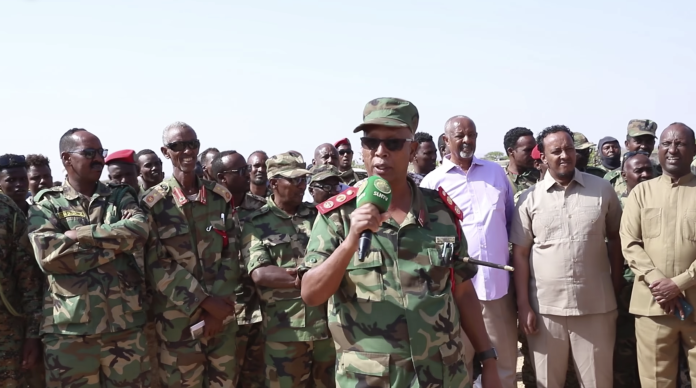
Somaliland General Tani addressing newly deployed forces in Oog, urging them to be prepared for a tough battle alongside the army (5 Sep 2023)

On 19 October 2023, Somalia officially recognized SSC-Khaatumo as a federal member state. After August 2023 there were only brief outbreaks of armed conflict between SSC and Somaliland. During November 2023, their forces clashed in the villages of Buq-Dharkayn and Yeyle. This fighting increasingly involved militants from the Habr Je'lo sub-clan of the Isaaq, with various Somaliland politicians trying to mobilize the sub-clan to fight the SSC militias as they reside around contested territories. During December 2023, Somaliland claimed it arrested spies working for Somalia, Khatumo, and Puntland authorities. Somaliland and SSC-Khatumo forces continued to reinforce positions near the frontline into the end of 2023.

A significant escalation in the number of Somaliland army troops being trained in Ethiopia over 2024 have raised concerns that President Muse Bihi is planning a new offensive aimed at conquering the land lost to the SSC regional administration during the summer of 2023. In July 2024 Africa Confidential observed that Bihi may have, "...calculated that a blitzkrieg in the east could restore confidence in him among members of the Isaq clan." During a public speech to the army, Bihi declared that the war would not end until Somaliland achieved victory. As of August 2024, the front line was 100km west from the city of Las Anod, where a military stalemate presently holds, and the carrying of weapons is strictly prohibited within the city. SSC and Somaliland have still not exchanged prisoners of war, with the exception of two injured soldiers. On August 28, fighting briefly broke out in Erigavo District of the Sanaag region.

=== Spillover into Sanaag and Buhodle ===
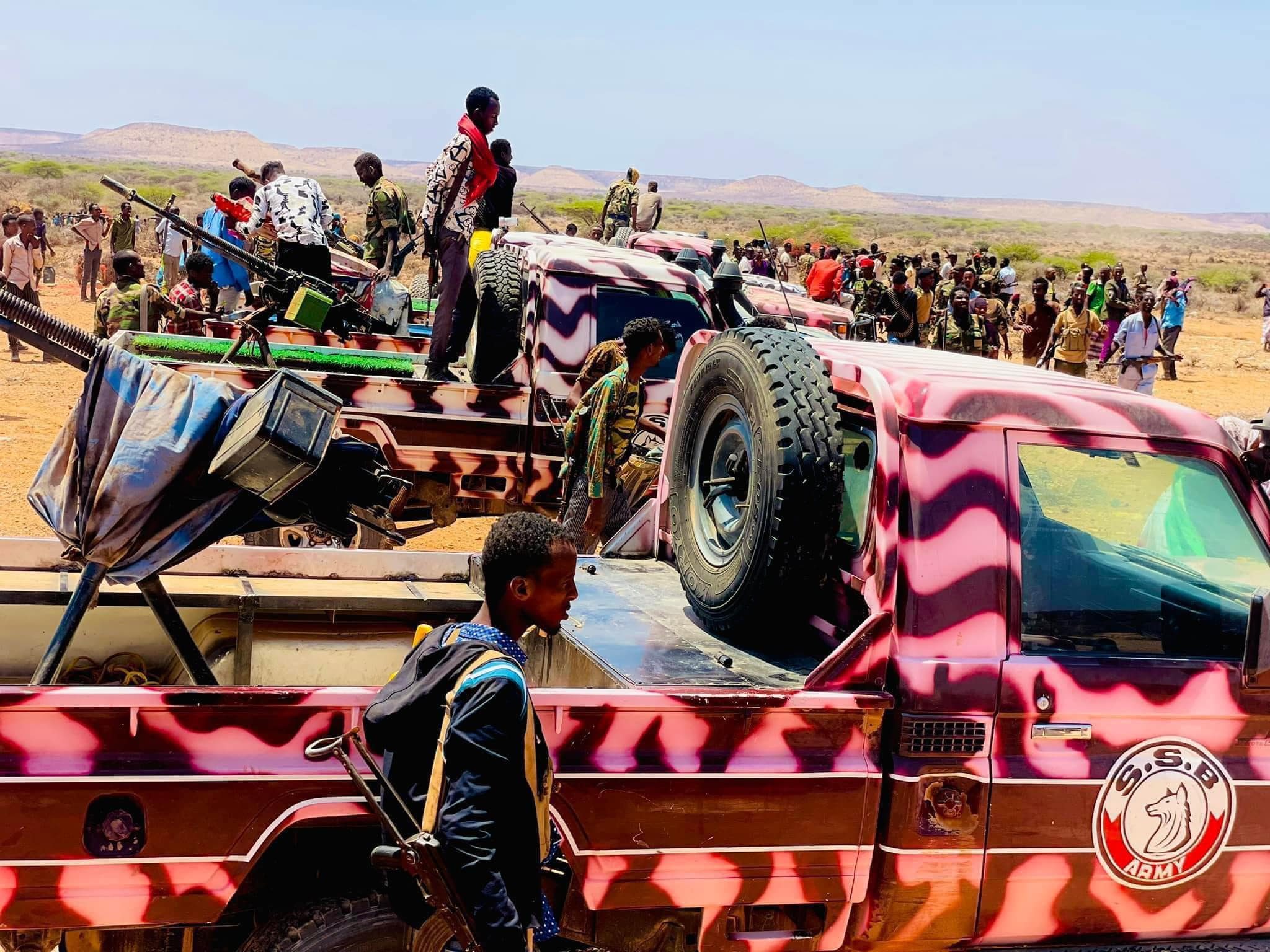
SSB civil militias stationed near Qorilugud

After a several-month long lull in major fighting, the 2024 Buhodle clashes erupted between SSC and SSB Habr Je'lo militias, backed by Somaliland forces, around the town of Qoorlugud in the Buhoodle District of Cayn region from October 31 and continued into November 1, 2024. Intense gunfire and artillery exchanges occurred during the fighting and both sides are reported to be mobilizing troops to the frontlines, further raising tensions. Daily life in Qoorlugud has been heavily disrupted and residents have been displaced by the fighting. SSC claims it was attacked by Somaliland forces, while the Somaliland government claims the fighting was orchestrated by the Federal Government of Somalia in order to disrupt the upcoming 2024 presidential election. The initiator of the fighting remains unclear, as each side accuses the other, and both have claimed victory. The confirmed death toll as a result of the renewed fighting is over 25, with many more injured. Both parties have captured POWs.

On 26 November 2024, fighting broke out in the city of Erigavo in Sanaag region between Somaliland security forces and armed groups. SSC issued a statement accusing Somaliland of deliberately harming civilians in the city after gunfire was reported there on noon that day. The interior minister of Somaliland warned against any armed mobilization in the city, announced the imposition of a curfew and ordered arrests.

On December 14, SSC-Khaatumo forces launched a coordinated assault on Somaliland positions within Erigavo. Local reports indicate that the fighting concentrated in the northern and eastern parts of the city, with both sides deploying heavy weaponry. Civilians were caught in the crossfire, and hospitals in the region were overwhelmed with casualties. Somaliland forces mounted a counteroffensive on December 15, expelling SSC-Khatumo fighters out of the city, with SSC-Khatumo fighters fully withdrawing by the next day. Governor Muse declared victory, stating: "The army has orders to take strict action against anyone looting houses. Civilians carrying weapons will be arrested immediately." According to multiple sources, the clashes resulted in "at least seven deaths and scores of injuries" among combatants and civilians. The United Nations Office for the Coordination of Humanitarian Affairs (OCHA) later reported that nearly 43,000 people were displaced as a result of the fighting.

During late December 2024, both Somaliland and SSC began taking efforts to resolve the protracted conflict between the two peacefully.

On 11 January, Somaliland forces with the help of local militia captured the Jiidali town east of Erigavo.

On January 30, SSB militias clashed with SSC-Khatumo fighters in the Shangeed area, claiming to have captured SSC-Khatumo fighters and seized vehicles during the skirmish, showcasing their captives as evidence of their success in the confrontation.

On March 7, heavy clashes broke out between SSB civil militias, backed by Somaliland forces and SSC-Khatumo fighters near Buqdharkayn and Yeyle, with initial reports indicating the clashes began between SSC-Khatumo forces and SSB militias before Somaliland's military later intervened. The Somaliland government strongly condemned the clashes, with the spokesperson of Somaliland's Ministry of Interior accusing SSC-Khatumo fighters of attempting to loot livestock from local herders. Somaliland also claimed to have inflicted heavy losses on the militants. SSC-Khatumo accused Somaliland forces of starting the fighting at their military bases according to a statement.

On April 18, heavy fighting broke out between Somaliland forces and SSC-Khaatumo militias in the Daanweyne and Dhuurmadare areas of the Sanaag region after SSC-Khaatumo forces allegedly launched an attack on local pastoralists, with images circulated on social media showing prisoners and military vehicles allegedly captured by Somaliland forces during the fighting. The Somaliland government has accused the Federal Government of Somalia of involvement in the fighting, with Somaliland Armed Forces seizing a cache of weapons bearing markings of the Federal Government of Somalia.

On April 27, Somaliland forces and SSC-Khaatumo militias clashed between the areas of Fadhiyar and Lanhabal near the town of Oog in Sool region, resulting in two dead and three others injured.

=== Conflict with Puntland ===
Puntland, established in 1998 as Somalia's first autonomous state, has historically administered the SSC regions based on kinship ties within the Harti sub-clan of the Darood family, (primarily Majerteen, Dhulbahante, and Warsangali sub-clans). During the conflict Puntland aided SSC-Khatumo, providing it with crucial military and logistic support. After Somaliland forces withdrew from Las Anod, SSC-Khatumo leaders declared a new federal member state directly accountable to Mogadishu. This alliance dissolved when the Federal Government of Somalia (FGS) formally recognized SSC-Khatumo as an interim administration in October 2023, a move Puntland condemned as unconstitutional, asserting that SSC-Khatumo's creation violates Somalia's provisional constitution, which requires local referendums or clan consensus for boundary changes. In April 2025, Puntland severed ties with the FGS, declaring independence until constitutional disputes are resolved. The FGS's recognition of SSC-Khatumo without Puntland's consultation ignited the current crisis, with both administrations claiming jurisdiction over SSC territories.

SSC-Khatumo, with FGS support, claims eastern Sanaag as a component territory, but its Warsangeli-majority communities as well as Puntland (which administers said Warsangeli territory) oppose inclusion, with elders insisting the region remains "historically and constitutionally" part of Puntland.

On May 24, SSC-Khatumo militia seized the border village of Shahda, prompting Puntland to deploy troops. The confrontation nearly escalated into open conflict before clan elders negotiated a temporary withdrawal. Puntland's Minister of Information, Mahmoud Aydiid Dirir, publicly condemned SSC-Khaatumo's actions, accusing its leadership of trying to carve out Puntland territory, a move he described as "unacceptable and provocative."

On July 4, Somali president Hassan Sheikh Mohamud and prime minister Hamza Abdi Barre approved arms delivery to Las Anod, ahead of a federal-backed planned conference formally establishing Khatumo State, raising tensions between Puntland and SSC-Khatumo. Puntland officials accused the federal government in Mogadishu of fueling instability and undermining Puntland's regional authority. Federal authorities launched a covert initiative aimed at shifting territorial loyalties in parts of the Sanaag and Haylaan regions, long administered by Puntland, toward the newly emerging SSC-Khaatumo administration.

On July 5, former Puntland speaker of parliament Abdirashid Yusuf Jibril, who advocates for eastern Sanaag regions incorporation into SSC-Khatumo, appeared in the village of Ceelbuh organizing a conference with clan elders from the Warsangeli community, aimed at rallying support for joining SSC-Khatumo.

On July 9, traditional elders from Sanaag and Haylaan rejected SSC-Khatumo affiliation, declaring their regions "historically and constitutionally part of Puntland" and demanding an end to federal interference.

On July 15, heavy fighting broke out in Dhahar between Puntland forces and local clan militias loyal to SSC-Khatumo, leaving dozens of people and regional forces dead. The clashes began after Puntland forces, in particular members of Puntland's Maritime Police Force (PMPF) moved into Dhahar to dismantle newly established security checkpoints. The fierce gunfight, lasting hours, killed four soldiers and wounded ten others. The fighting coincided with a clan conference currently underway in Las Anod, where members of the Warsangeli and Dhulbahante clans are discussing the formation of a new federal member state, pushed by the federal government in Mogadishu. That same day the Puntland parliament voted to expel Abdirashid Yusuf Jibril days after authorities issued an arrest warrant. Puntland president Said Abdullahi Deni had also previously issued a stern warning, holding the federal government responsible for attempts to incorporate Sanaag into SSC-Khatumo. Somalia's Ministry of Interior urged Puntland to withdraw troops deployed to Dhahar.

On July 16, Puntland Deputy Minister of Security Ahmed Mahmoud Ahmed and Puntland Deputy Police Commander 1st Deputy Commander of the Puntland Police Force, Gen. Aydiid Ahmed Nur, arrived in Dhahar and held meetings with some of the traditional elders of the area.

Approximate map of the current phase of the Somali Civil War (Updated June 2025) Somalia: Under control of the Federal Government of Somalia, the African Union Support and Stabilization Mission in Somalia, and the United States Under control of the Government of Puntland Under control of the Jubaland Dervish Force and the Raskamboni Movement Jihadist insurgent groups: Under presence/control of al-Qaeda-backed al-Shabaab and allies Under control of Islamic State-backed Somalia Wilayah Somaliland: Under control of the self-declared state of Somaliland (For a more detailed map of the current military situation, see here.)

== Allegations of external actors ==
Both sides have alleged the presence of external actors. The Somaliland foreign ministry allege they are fighting foreign armed groups on the Las Anod side including the Somali National Army, Puntland Security Force, Liyu Police and Al-Shabaab. These allegations have been dismissed by experts and observers as Somaliland President Muse Bihi seeking to blame his failures on outsiders. Both the regional Puntland government and the federal Somali government have effectively stayed out of the dispute.

All groups accused by the Somaliland government have denied claims of involvement:

- On 9 February 2023, Al-Shabaab made a press release rejecting the Somaliland administration's claims of involvement in the Las Anod war and accusing them of apostacy.
- On 6 March 2023, Puntland President Said Abdulllahi Dani denied Puntland involvement in the war and called for self-determination in the Sool region. However, in a local election campaign speech in Galkacyo, Deni accused Hassan Sheikh Mohamud and Muse Bihi of colluding against SSC-Khatumo and Puntland, that he was ready to defend both admins from all threats on May 5.
- On 11 March 2023, Ethiopia's Somali Region President Mustafa "Cajgar" Omar denied involvement in the war.

The Dhulbahante clan accuse the Somaliland side of involving Djiboutian National Police officers and Chinese weaponry smuggled via Djibouti. The Djiboutian government denied these claims.

== Casualties and human rights violations ==
It is unknown exactly how many people have died in all during the conflict.

During the first weeks of fighting, Somaliland forces cut the water supply to Las Anod causing a water shortage that significantly impacted both the civilian population and the SSC fighters present. A sharp increase in the price of water put a heavy burden on medical/humanitarian staff operating in the area and the remaining local residents. Rains that came in March and April 2023 helped alleviate the shortage.

=== Indiscriminate attacks on civilian targets ===
According to the findings of an April 2023 report released by Amnesty International, Somaliland forces "...indiscriminately shelled the town, damaging hospitals, schools and mosques, killing and injuring civilians, and displacing tens of thousands of people." Mortars and 107 mm rockets were utilized in dense urban areas. By April, the city general hospital had been struck four times. Women, children and elderly residents of Las Anod were among the victims of the artillery shelling. Amnesty found that Somaliland violated the prohibition in international humanitarian law of indiscriminate attacks.

== See also ==
- Battle of Las Anod (2007)
- 2024 Buhodle clashes
- Battle of Erigavo
- Battle of Jiidali
- Battle of Tukaraq
- Puntland–Somaliland dispute
