= 2024 Buhodle clashes =

Clashes between Somaliland-affiliated SSB militia and SSC-Khatumo

- Part of Las Anod conflict
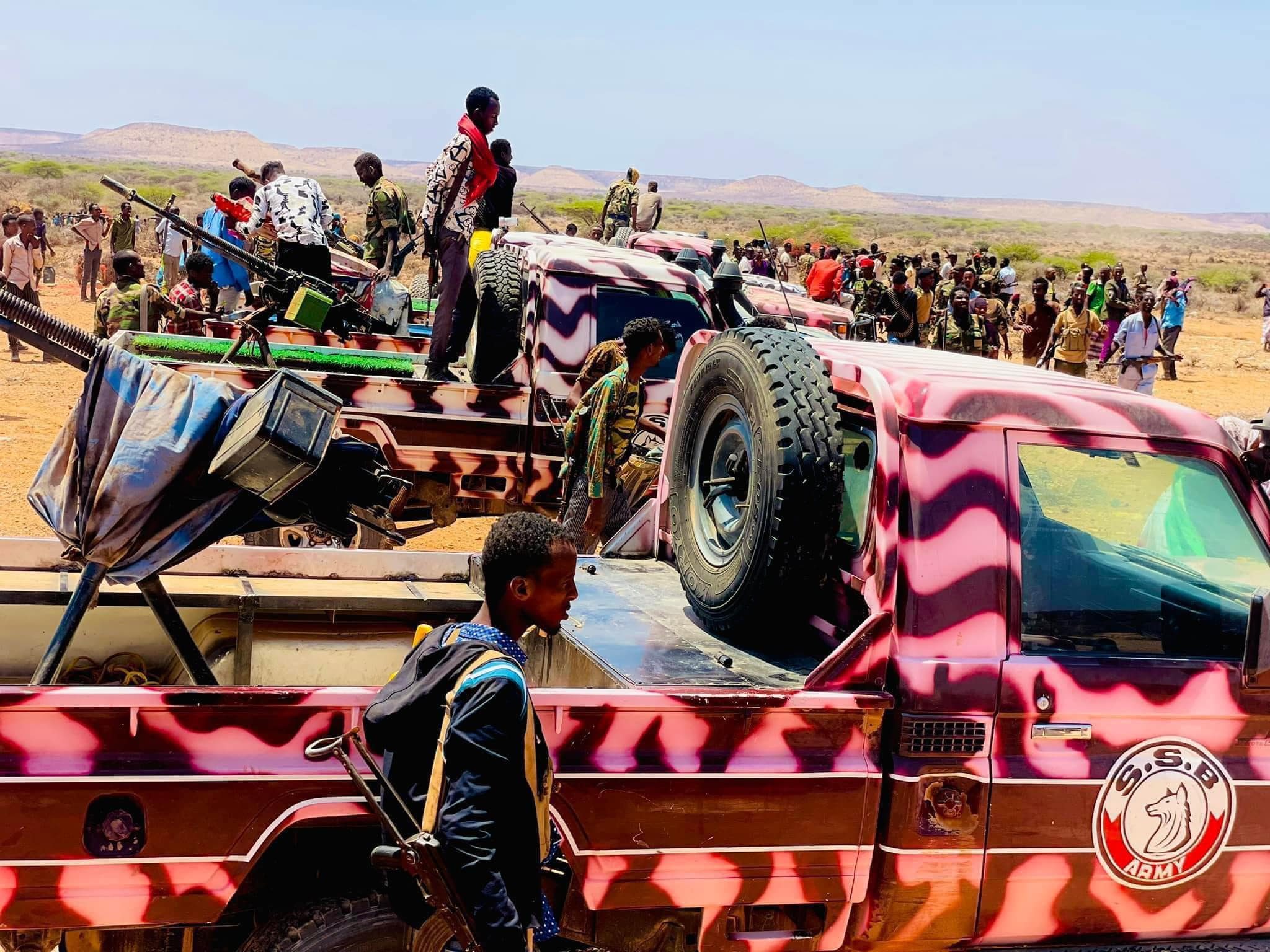
- SSB civil militia stationed near the frontline
Date	October 31 – November 1, 2024
Location	Buuhoodle District, Togdheer region, Somaliland
Result	Somaliland victory

Belligerents
Somaliland; SSB	SSC-Khatumo

Commanders and leaders
Boqor Buurmadow; Adan Sahal Ali “Biindhe”	(Khatumo) Abdi Madoobe (WIA) (Khatumo) Abdiqani Sulub †

Strength
Unknown	Unknown

Casualties and losses
Unknown	Several wounded 2 vehicles lost Several fighters killed

The 2024 Buhodle clashes took place between October 31 and November 1, 2024, in Buhodle district, near the town of Qorilugud, located in the Togdheer region of Somaliland. The conflict involved forces from Somaliland, primarily the affiliated SSB civil militia, and the SSC-Khaatumo movement. The clashes occurred days before Somaliland's scheduled national elections on November 13. The initiation of hostilities remains disputed, with both sides accusing each other of instigating the clash.

== Background ==
The area between Qorilugud and Buuhoodle serves as a clan borderland and buffer zone between the Habr Je'lo clan (part of the Isaaq clan-family) and the Dhulbahante (part of the Darod clan-family), with the Habr Je'lo inhabiting Qorilugud to the northwest and the Dhulbahante inhabiting Megagle and Buuhoodle to the southeast. Both sides have historically been involved in regular conflicts in the area, including the Kalshaale clashes in 2011–12.

The SSC-Khaatumo administration, formed in February 2023 by traditional leaders in eastern Somaliland, seeks autonomy within Somalia and rejects Somaliland's claims over the SSC regions. Tensions escalated after Somaliland President Muse Bihi Abdi announced plans in August 2024 to reclaim SSC territories, prompting the group to vow resistance.

The area near Qorilugud, a town under Somaliland control, became a focal point due to its proximity to contested areas and its role as a military base. Earlier clashes occurred between Somaliland forces backed by Habar Je'lo SSB militias and SSC-Khaatumo on 30 November 2023, including the use of heavy artillery, leaving at least 30 deaths as well as an unknown number of wounded.

Tensions between Somaliland and SSC-Khaatumo had been escalating in the regions surrounding Qorilugud. Both parties had vested interests in the area, leading to frequent skirmishes and a volatile security situation.

== The Battle ==
On October 31, 2024, heavy fighting erupted between Somaliland forces, mainly the local SSB civil militias belonging to the Habr Je'lo clan, and SSC-Khaatumo fighters in the areas between Qorilugud and Buhoodle, near the village of Galgal. The confrontation resulted in significant casualties on both sides. Somaliland's Ministry of Internal Affairs reported that SSC-Khaatumo forces attacked residents of Qorilugud, prompting a defensive response from Somaliland's national army and allied local militias. The ministry claimed that the attackers suffered heavy losses during the confrontation, with the total confirmed death toll surpassing 25.

The following days, November 1–2, SSC-Khaatumo forces attempted a second assault on the town of Shangeed, situated between Qorilugud and Buhoodle, but were reportedly repelled by SSB and Somaliland forces.

Notable casualties from the SSC-Khaatumo side included the death of Abdiqani Sulub, second in-command of Buhoodle's local SSC militia and injuries sustained by Abdi Madoobe. Additionally, SSC-Khaatumo lost two vehicles and several fighters during the clashes.

== Reactions ==
The Somaliland government accused the Federal Government of Somalia of orchestrating the attacks to disrupt Somaliland's democratic processes, particularly the national elections scheduled for November 2024. Somaliland also accused Somalia, Egypt, and Turkey of supplying advanced weaponry to SSC-Khaatumo, alleging a plot to undermine Somaliland's sovereignty. In a statement, Somaliland's Ministry of Internal Affairs alleged that the violence was part of a broader strategy by Mogadishu to destabilize the region.

On the other hand, SSC-Khaatumo representatives accused Somaliland forces of initiating the conflict by attacking their positions and infringing upon territories under their control. The Federal Government of Somalia denied any involvement in the hostilities, asserting that it had no role in the events that transpired in Qorilugud.

== Aftermath ==
The battle concluded with Somaliland forces successfully repelling SSC-Khaatumo fighters and maintaining control over Qorilugud, though SSC officials also claimed victory. The confrontation resulted in heightened tensions between the involved parties, with both sides bolstering their military presence in the region in anticipation of potential future clashes.

An estimated 26,550 individuals from 4,425 families were displaced as a result of the conflict, primarily fleeing to Buuhoodle and its surrounding areas.

== See also ==
- Battle of Erigavo
- Battle of Jiidali
- Las Anod conflict
