= Battle of Dhabansaar =

- Part of Las Anod conflict (2023–present)
Date	16 May 2023
Location	Dhaban-saar, Sool
Result	Somaliland victory
Territorial changes	Somaliland forces repel SSC-Khaatumo attacks

Belligerents
Somaliland	(Khatumo) SSC Khaatumo

Commanders and leaders
(Somaliland) General Nuh Ismail Tani	(Khatumo) Abdikhadir Ahmed Aw-Ali

Strength
Unknown	~70 technical vehicles and ground forces

Casualties and losses
Unknown	Unknown; retreat reported, vehicles and equipment captured

The Battle of Dhabansaar, fought on May 16, 2023, was a confrontation between Somaliland's national army and SSC-Khatumo forces in the Sool region of Somaliland. The battle was marked by intense combat and significant strategic implications for both sides. Following coordinated attacks by SSC-Khaatumo, Somaliland forces successfully defended their positions, repelling the offensive and capturing equipment while forcing the opposing forces to retreat.

== Background ==
In the lead-up to the battle, tensions between Somaliland and SSC-Khaatumo escalated significantly in the Sool region, particularly around Laascaanood. Both sides had fortified their positions, anticipating further clashes over control of strategic locations. The area surrounding Dhaban-saar became a focal point due to its proximity to supply routes critical to the Somaliland army's operations.

== The Battle ==
=== Initiation of Hostilities ===
On the morning of May 16, 2023, SSC-Khaatumo forces launched simultaneous offensives on multiple fronts around Laascaanood, targeting Somaliland positions in the western, eastern, and Maraaga fronts. In a statement, SSC-Khaatumo accused Somaliland of initiating aggression, stating: "This morning, the invading militia of the Somaliland administration launched unjustified attacks on Las Anod from several directions, including the west, east, and the Maraaga area.".

=== Somaliland Counteroffensive ===
In response, the Somaliland National Army mounted a robust defense. General Taani reported that approximately 70 technical vehicles belonging to SSC-Khaatumo forces attempted to seize control of key supply routes near Adhicadeeye, intending to disrupt Somaliland's logistics. He described the situation as follows: "The ongoing conflict in Las Anod, the capital of Sool region, is being fueled by terrorists and troublemakers. Today, clashes took place in Las Anod and the surrounding area of Dhabansaar.".

The fiercest fighting took place near Dhaban-saar at approximately 6:00 a.m., where Somaliland forces successfully repelled the SSC-Khaatumo offensive, forcing them to retreat towards the village of Bali-Hadhac. General Taani emphasized the preparedness of the Somaliland army, stating: "The National Army, taking that matter into account, launched a counter-offensive.".

== Casualties and Aftermath ==
The battle resulted in casualties on both sides, though specific numbers remain disputed. General Taani acknowledged losses, stating: "Losses will occur, deaths will happen, and injuries will take place, but the question remains—who truly won? Victory achieved by us".

Following the battle, Somaliland forces displayed vehicles and equipment captured during the confrontation, including technical vehicles and various weaponry. The Somaliland government hailed the victory as a demonstration of its military superiority and accused SSC-Khaatumo forces of collaborating with external actors to destabilize the region.

== Reactions ==
The Somaliland Ministry of Defense characterized the SSC-Khaatumo attack as an act of aggression instigated by external forces, including terrorist elements. General Taani remarked: "They are obstructing May 18th, but wherever the National Army stands, it hopes for victory.".

Meanwhile, SSC-Khaatumo claimed that they were defending their positions against unprovoked aggression and insisted they had inflicted significant losses on Somaliland forces.
