= Abwan Jama Kadiye =

Somali poet (1950–2023)

Abwaan Jama Kadiye
- Abwaan Jaamac Cilmi Kadiye
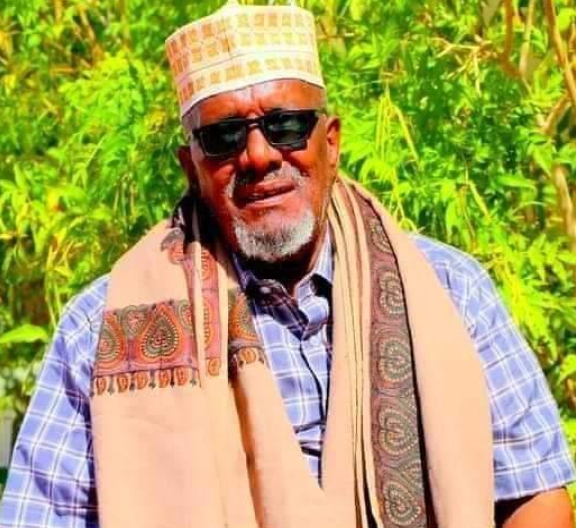
- Born: Jaamac Cilmi Kadiye; 1950; Garab, Sool, Somalia
- Died: 16 August 2023 (aged 73); Las Anod, Sool, SSC-Khaatumo
- Resting place: Gambadhe, Sool
- Citizenship: Somalia
- Occupations: writer; poet
- Writing career
- Language: Arabic; English language; Somali language
- Period: 1972–2023
- Genres: Gabay; Maanyo; Geeraar; Guurow; Saar rhythmic

Abwan Jama Elmi Kadiye (Arabic: ابوان جامع علمي كدي; Somali: Abwaan Jaamac Kadiye Cilmi; 1950 – 16 August 2023) was a Somali poet and writer. He was killed after being attributed to the indiscriminate mortar shelling in Las Anod, believed to have been carried out by Somaliland.

== Personal life ==
Kadiye was born in 1950 during the spring known as (Somali: Gugii Siig Case) in the rural area of the valley called 'Garab' between Yayle and Guumays in the Sool region, He hailed from the Dhulbahante sub-clan of Harti, Darod. before he died, he had 11 children.

Kadiye was a traditional poet renowned for creating poetry that addresses social, political, religious, and cultural themes. His works encompassed various forms such as 'Gabay,' 'Gurow,' 'Maanyo,' 'Geeraar,' and the 'Saar' rhythmic poetry form. He demonstrated proficiency in speaking Somali, Arabic, and English.

== Literary career ==
Kadiye became a prominent poet in 1972 and is among the poets who engage in composing and performing this artistic form. His works were broadcast on Somali radio stations Mogadishu and Hargeisa.

During the 1977 Somali-Ethiopian war, Kadiye wrote numerous poems aimed at raising awareness among Somalis about unity, encouraging them to come together and express their patriotism.

Kadiye undertook numerous trips abroad, participating in international cultural shows where he presented various literary works about Somali culture.

== Published works ==
- Poetry of preach.
- Gabaygii Marabbida.

== Political views ==
Kadiye was a patriot and believed in the concept of a greater Somali union. After the collapse of the central government of the Somali Democratic Republic, he resided in his hometown Las Anod, on the other hand Somaliland, a self-declared breakaway from the Republic of Somalia, Kadiye staunchly opposed secessionists and actively participated in the establishment of Puntland in 1998.

In October 2007, a situation unfolded in Las Anod, where the region of Somaliland took control of the city. This event led to the displacement of individuals, including Kadiye, who hailed from the area and held strong opposition to the presence of Somaliland forces in Las Anod. Subsequently, Kadiye relocated to Garowe.

In February 2023, a conflict erupted in Las Anod, resulting in the expulsion of the Somaliland army from the city. The military forces retreated to Goja-Adde base. Notably, Kadiye, who had been actively engaged in opposing the Somaliland presence, remained involved in the events that transpired in the region, particularly those related to the SSC-Khatumo movement.

== Death ==
On 16 August 2023, the confirmation of the poet's death came from his relatives, who were reached out to by Somali media. The family claimed that his murder had been coordinated by the Somaliland army, which was in response to an official resident's acknowledgment of indiscriminate shelling involving mortars and artillery in the city of Las Anod. Somaliland denied the allegation.

=== Funeral ===
A state funeral took place in the city of Gambadha, located in the Sool region. The event was attended by a multitude of individuals, including officials from Puntland and SSC-Khaatumo, traditional elders, and hundreds of people who journeyed from the cities of Garowe, (Gaalkacyo>Buuhoodle and Las Anod.

=== Reactions ===
Officials and politicians in Somalia, like Puntland President Said Abdullahi Deni, Somali Prime Minister Hamza Abdi Barre, Abdirahman Abdishakur Warsame, and Mahdi Mohammed Gulaid, made strong statements about a recent incident. They connected Somaliland to the attack and suggested that there could be actions taken in the future.

Abwan Osman Abdinur Hashi, a close friend of poet Abwan Jama Kadiye since 1971, talked with BBC Somali about his friend’s memorable qualities over the phone.

Kadiye was my friend for over 50 years. People remember him for his love for Somalia and his strong sense of patriotism. He disliked the idea of leaving his country and encouraged everyone to stay united and love Somalia. His poems are well-known among Somalis and will continue to be valued by future generations across the world. Kadiye’s poems often taught important lessons, especially about being mindful of one’s faith. His words left a lasting impact on both young and old listeners. In recent times, he has worked to bring Somalis together and strengthen the unity of the country. He strongly disliked favoritism and was always proud of a united Somalia.

— (BBC Somali)

Somali National Television was criticized for deleting a post on Facebook that some found controversial. Senior journalist Mohamed Harare said the TV station should think carefully about sensitive topics before sharing messages with the public. Some people also criticized President Hassan Sheikh Mohamud because he did not speak out or express sympathy after a well-known poet, who supported national unity, was murdered. President Mohamud was the only major public figure who stayed silent on the matter, leading to more discussions and debates online.
