= Las Anod conflict =

Las Anod conflict may refer to:

- Las Anod conflict (2023), an armed conflict in Las Anod, Somaliland
  - Siege of Las Anod (2023), a major event during the 2023 conflict
- Battle of Las Anod (2007), a battle between Somaliland and Puntland forces
