= Battle of Jiidali (2025) =

2025 battle in Jiidali, Somaliland

Date	January 11, 2025
Location	Jidali, Sanaag region, Somaliland
Result	Somaliland victory
Territorial changes	Somaliland National Army captures Jidali

Belligerents
Somaliland	SSC-Khatumo

Commanders and leaders
Unknown	Unknown

Strength
Somaliland National Army	Khatumo dervish force

Casualties and losses
Unknown	Unknown

The Battle of Jiidali occurred on January 11, 2025, when Somaliland forces captured the town of Jiidali, located in the eastern Sanaag region near the city of Ceerigaabo. The operation was considered a strategic move by Somaliland to consolidate control over contested areas in the region and to counter the growing influence of SSC-Khaatumo forces.

== Background ==
Jiidali is considered a significant location due to its proximity to Erigavo, despite not being a direct frontline in the ongoing conflict between Somaliland and SSC-Khaatumo forces.

Jiidali is also the site of the tomb of Zubeyr Awal, one of the grandsons of Sheikh Ishaaq, Zubery Awal is also the eponymous ancestor of the Habr Awal. The town is approximately 100 km east of the tomb of his grandfather Sheikh Ishaaq bin Ahmed, the founding father of the Isaaq clan family, whose tomb is located in the coastal town of Maydh.

=== Ceelbuh Conference ===
The capture of Jiidali followed the recent SSC-Khaatumo conference held in Ceelbuh, which outlined political and security strategies opposing Somaliland's administration. The Ceelbuh conference reaffirmed SSC-Khaatumo's political stance against Somaliland, prompting Somaliland's military to launch a preemptive operation to secure Jiidali and prevent it from becoming a stronghold for SSC-Khaatumo forces.

== The battle and Capture of Jiidali ==
On January 11, 2025, Somaliland forces advanced into Jiidali, encountering minimal resistance. The move was primarily aimed at securing the area and ensuring that it would not be used as a staging ground for anti-Somaliland forces. Reports indicate that Somaliland's military presence in Jiidali is focused on bolstering security and deterring SSC-Khaatumo movements in the region.

== Reactions ==
=== Somaliland's Position ===
Somaliland officials viewed the capture of Jiidali as a necessary action to maintain stability and prevent escalating tensions. They framed the operation as a defensive measure in light of the SSC-Khaatumo conference in Ceelbuh and its resolutions opposing Somaliland's governance.

=== SSC-Khaatumo's Response ===
SSC-Khaatumo leaders and local residents criticized Somaliland's actions, describing them as unwarranted and an overreach, given that Jiidali had not been a focal point of active conflict. They argued that the move was an attempt to exert pressure on the local population and suppress opposition to Somaliland's administration.

== Aftermath ==
The occupation of Jiidali by Somaliland forces is expected to heighten tensions between Somaliland and SSC-Khaatumo. Analysts suggest that the move could lead to further militarization in the Sanaag region and potentially provoke retaliatory actions from SSC-Khaatumo-aligned groups.

== See also ==
- 2024 Buhodle clashes
- Battle of Erigavo
- Las Anod conflict
