= SSB (militia) =

Security force in Somalia

SSB Civil Force
- Ciidamada Madaniga SSB
- Leaders: Mohamed Awil (Sii-Arag); Boqor Osman Aw Mahamud (Buurmadow); Adan Sahal Ali (Biindhe)
- Founded: 2023
- Dates active: 2023–2024
- Dissolved: 2025
- Country: Somaliland
- Allegiance: Somaliland National Army
- Headquarters: Qorilugud, Somaliland
- Active regions: Sool, Sanaag, and Togdheer
- Ideology: Somaliland Nationalism; Habr Je'lo interests
- Size: 6,000 (2025)

The SSB Civil Force (short for Sool, Sanaag, Buhoodle) (Somali: Ciidamada Madaniga SSB) was a paramilitary clan militia that operates in the Sool, Sanaag and Togdheer regions of Somaliland. The militia was formed by and is affiliated with the Habr Je'lo clan, part of the wider Isaaq clan-family.

The SSB was formed in October 2023 in Qorilugud, Togdheer region, and was formed as a regional security force, prompted by clashes between Somaliland forces and SSC-Khatumo fighters, drawing members from local Habr Je'lo clan militias in Sanaag and Togdheer regions. The SSB's main mandate is to defend and secure Habr Je'lo tribal territory. The militia has been involved in counterinsurgency operations against SSC-Khatumo forces.

On March 1, Somaliland officially integrated the first battalion of the SSB clan militia into its armed forces following days of negotiations in the Sanaag region, integrating two more on March 4. However, tensions have emerged over the Somaliland government's plan to integrate local clan militias, particularly the SSB as well as the G36 militia, into the national security forces, with many locals complaining they would lose their ability to act autonomously in local security matters and marginalization within the central command.

The process has since been completed, with around 6,000 clan militias having been integrated into the national army without international assistance despite the Irro administration inheriting empty coffers and an estimated US$81 million in debts from the previous Muse Bihi administration.

== Battles ==
The SSB has been involved in numerous clashes with SSC-Khatumo, including heavy clashes on 30 November 2023, including the use of heavy artillery, leaving at least 30 deaths as well as an unknown number of wounded.

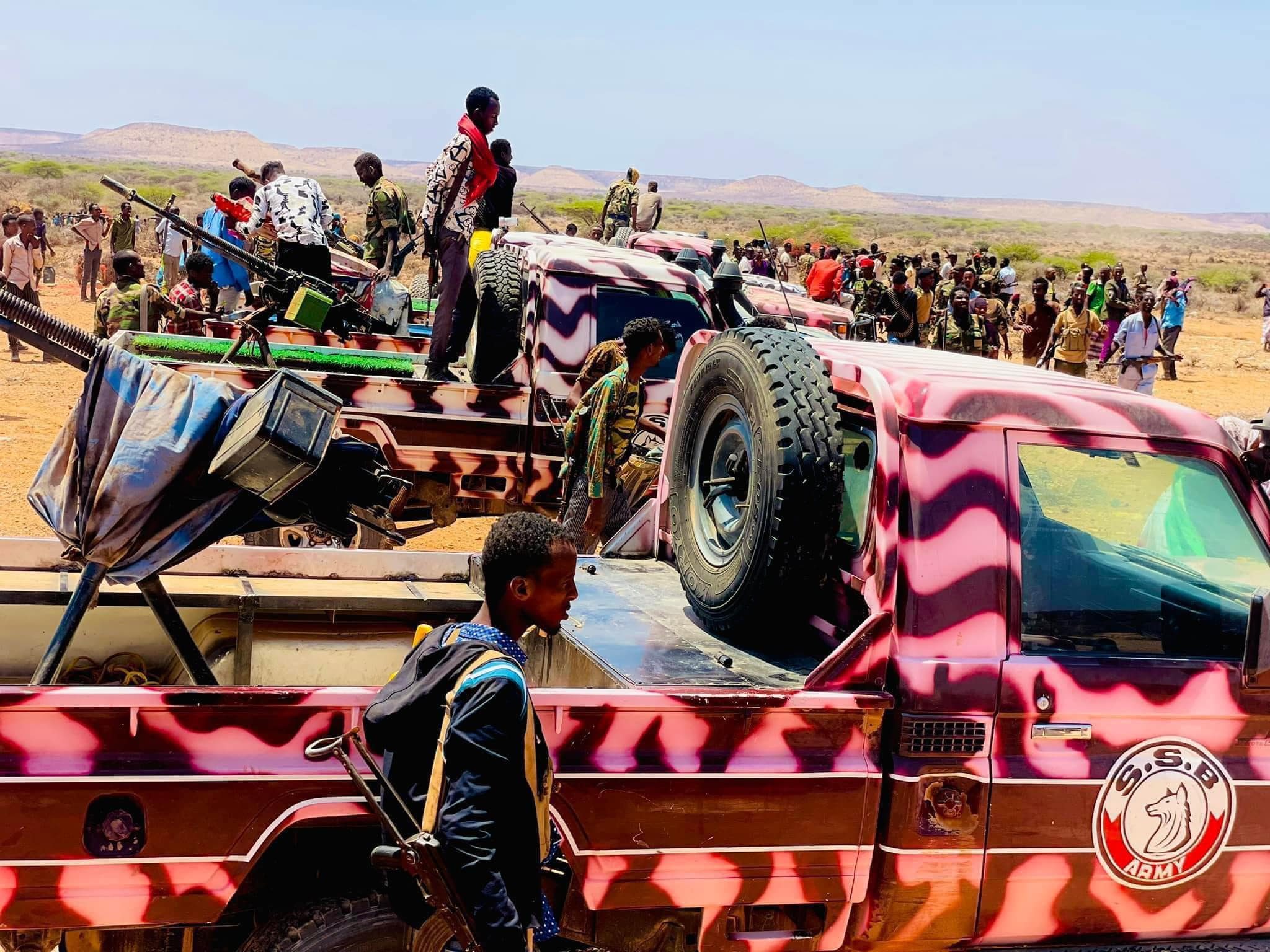
SSB civil militias stationed near Qorilugud

On October 31, 2024, heavy fighting erupted between SSB and SSC-Khaatumo fighters in the areas between Qorilugud and Buhoodle, near the village of Galgal. The confrontation resulted in significant casualties on both sides. Somaliland's Ministry of Internal Affairs reported that SSC-Khaatumo forces attacked residents of Qorilugud, prompting a defensive response from Somaliland's national army and allied local militias. The ministry claimed that the attackers suffered heavy losses during the confrontation, with the total confirmed death toll surpassing 25.

The following days, November 1–2, SSC-Khaatumo forces attempted a second assault on the town of Shangeed, situated between Qorilugud and Buhoodle, but were reportedly repelled by SSB and Somaliland forces.

Somaliland forces, backed by SSB civil militias, mounted a counteroffensive during the Battle of Erigavo on December 15, 2024, pushing SSC-Khatumo fighters out of the city, with SSC-Khatumo fighters fully withdrawing by the next day.

On January 30, SSB millitias clashed with SSC-Khatumo fighters in the Shangeed area, claiming to have captured SSC-Khatumo fighters and seized vehicles during the skirmish, showcasing their captives as evidence of their success in the confrontation.

On March 7, heavy clashes broke out between SSB civil militias, backed by Somaliland forces and SSC-Khatumo fighters near Buqdharkayn and Yeyle, with initial reports indicating the clashes began between SSC-Khatumo forces and SSB militias before Somaliland's military later intervened in support of SSB forces.
