= Battle of Las Anod (2007) =

2007 battle of the Puntland–Somaliland dispute

- Part of Puntland–Somaliland dispute
- Las Anod location in Somaliland
Date	15 October 2007; 18 years ago
Location	Las Anod, Somaliland
Result	Somaliland Victory
Territorial changes	Las Anod captured by Somaliland National Army

Belligerents
Somaliland; Somaliland National Army	Somalia; Puntland

Casualties and losses
- 10–20 people dead

The 2007 Battle of Las Anod saw Somaliland National Army engage Puntland forces in Las Anod, capital of the Sool region. The ensuing battle resulted in Somaliland ousting the Puntland army from the city.

== Overview ==
Las Anod had until then been controlled by Puntland, who took control of the regional capital in 2002.

Somaliland had however been aiding local clan militias opposed to Puntland presence in the city. The clan militias were loyal to Ahmed Abdi Habsade, a former Puntland minister who later on defected to Somaliland.

== Battle ==
In October 2007, the conflict mushroomed into a regional conflict over control of the city of Las Anod, as Somaliland regular army forces mobilized from their base in the town of Adhicadeeye, west of the city, and entered the conflict. Puntland was slow to mobilize a counter-attack, as Puntland's weak economy and overstretched military obligations in Mogadishu prevented a rapid response. After assuming control of the city on 15 October, Somaliland moved Sool's regional administration into Las Anod. Between 10 and 20 people were reported to be dead.

== See also ==
- 2023 Las Anod conflict
- Battle of Tukaraq
- 2010 Ayn Clashes
