= Battle of Las Qoray =

- Part of Somaliland–Puntland dispute
Date	9 July 2008
Location	Laas Qoray, Sanaag, Somaliland
Result	Somaliland victory; Somaliland captures Las Khorey; 4 German citizens rescued; Fall of Maakhir State

Belligerents
Somaliland	Somalia; Puntland; Maakhir

Commanders and leaders
(Somaliland) Gurey Osman Salah	Unknown

Units involved
(Somaliland) 116th Brigade	Unknown

Strength
>20 armored trucks	Unknown

Casualties and losses
Unknown	Unknown

The Battle of Las Qoray occurred on 9 July 2008, amid the ongoing territorial disputes between Somaliland and Puntland. Somaliland troops invaded and occupied the port town of Las Qoray, citing a mission to rescue German citizens allegedly held hostage by pirates in the area.

== Background ==
On June 24, 2008, Puntland-based Somali pirates kidnapped four German nationals (among them a woman and a child) from Yemen and brought them to the vicinity of Las Qoray after the yacht of the German nationals ran out of fuel. Somaliland coastguards gave chase in speedboats from their main base in the port town of Berbera when the pirates entered Somaliland territorial waters as they headed to Puntland. The coastguards found the pirates' boat abandoned near Las Qoray The pirates moved to the mountains near Las Qoray in the disputed Sanag region with the hostages. The presence of hostages in the disputed region heightened tensions between Somaliland and Puntland, both of which sought to assert control over the area.

== The Battle ==
On 9 July 2008, the 116th Brigade of the Somaliland National Army entered Las Qoray, claiming their objective was to rescue the German hostages from pirate captivity. Somaliland forces (including some troops local to the area) seized the port town, facing no resistance from Puntland troops who withdrew from the area to avoid clashes, and took up positions 5 km east of the town. Somaliland forces reportedly also reached the Almadow mountain range near Las Qoray, where the hostages were held. The forces surrounded the pirates and sealed off the area. The Somaliland forces were backed by more than 20 armored trucks.

== Aftermath ==
The German hostages were eventually released without a reported ransom. The incident at Las Qoray contributed to the ongoing territorial disputes and occasional clashes between Somaliland and Puntland over the Sanaag region, triggering a tense stand-off between both sides. Somaliland forces later withdrew on July 12.
