= Fall of Goojacade =

2023 battle

Battle of Gooja'ade
- Part of the Las Anod conflict (2023–present)
Date	25 August 2023
Location	Gooja'ade, outskirts of Las Anod, Sool, Somalia
Result	SSC-Khatumo Victory

Belligerents
Somaliland	SSC-Khatumo

Commanders and leaders
(Somaliland) Faisal Bootaan (POW)	Abdikhadir Ahmed Aw-Ali

Casualties and losses
Unknown	Unknown

The Fall of Gooja'ade (also written Goojacade, Gooja'adde or Goojaadde) was a major military engagement on 25 August 2023 during the 2023 Las Anod conflict. It involved forces of the self-declared Somaliland and the pro-unity SSC-Khatumo movement, fighting for control of the Gooja'ade (Gooja’adde) military base near Las Anod in the Sool region. SSC forces claimed to have overrun the base and seized equipment, a development widely reported as a significant setback for Somaliland.

== Background ==
Las Anod, capital of the Sool region, has long been contested between Somaliland and local groups favoring union with the Federal Government of Somalia. In early 2023, violence escalated into open conflict after protests in Las Anod turned into an armed uprising. The SSC (Sool, Sanaag and Cayn) movement reorganized into SSC-Khatumo forces, seeking to expel Somaliland troops from the region. Gooja'ade base, positioned on the approaches to Las Anod, became a crucial stronghold for Somaliland’s military.

== Prelude ==
Months of fighting around Las Anod created heavy displacement and civilian suffering. By August 2023, SSC-Khatumo forces had taken control of several villages and were preparing to assault the last major Somaliland positions around the city. Gooja'ade was viewed as the gateway to Somaliland’s military presence in Sool.

== The battle ==
On 25 August 2023, SSC fighters launched a coordinated assault on the Gooja'ade base. Reports described intense gunfire and mortar shelling, lasting several hours. By the end of the day, SSC-Khatumo forces announced they had captured the base, seized vehicles, weapons, and detained Somaliland soldiers. Somaliland officials admitted setbacks but contested the scale of the losses. Independent observers could not immediately verify all battlefield claims.

== Casualties ==
Casualty figures remain disputed. SSC sources claimed dozens of Somaliland soldiers were killed or captured, while Somaliland authorities downplayed the losses. Civilian sources later reported injuries from shelling and unexploded ordnance in the area. Human rights groups expressed concern about the treatment of prisoners and the humanitarian toll of the wider Las Anod fighting.

== Aftermath ==
In the aftermath of the offensive, the Somaliland Ministry of Defense released a statement stating that its army withdrew from their positions in the eastern part of the Sool region for "strategic military purposes and is in the phase of reorganizing and preparing to counter the enemy."

The fall of Gooja'ade was hailed by SSC-Khatumo supporters as a turning point in the Las Anod conflict. Somaliland’s government vowed retaliation and reiterated its claims over Sool. International actors, including the UK and Amnesty International, renewed calls for ceasefire and dialogue. The battle highlighted the fragility of security in northern Somalia and intensified the humanitarian crisis in the Sool region.

== See also ==
- Las Anod conflict (2023–present)
- SSC (Sool, Sanaag and Cayn)
