= Battle of Kalshaale =

- Part of Puntland-Somaliland dispute and Las Anod conflict
Date	November 2010 – February 2011
Location	Kalshaale, near Buuhoodle, Somaliland
Result	Somaliland victory

Belligerents
Somaliland	Somalia; SSC-Khatumo; Puntland

Commanders and leaders
Nuh Ismail Tani	Siciid Dheere

Strength
1,200	500

Casualties and losses
Unknown	2,700 killed 16–20 injured 3,000 displaced

The Battle of Kalshaale was a series of clashes between Somaliland Forces and SSC militias from November 2010 to February 2011. The fighting occurred in the contested region of Kalshaale, near the town of Buuhoodle, as part of ongoing disputes over Somaliland's claim to the area.

== Background ==
Kalshaale is located in a contested region between Somaliland and areas claimed by the SSC militias, who opposed Somaliland's administration and sought greater autonomy or alignment with Puntland. Tensions escalated in late 2010, leading to armed confrontations.

== Clashes ==
The first significant clashes began in November 2010 when SSC forces attacked a Somaliland military base in Kalshaale. Both sides suffered casualties, with reports of several dozen fatalities.

The fighting intensified in February 2011, leading to one of the deadliest confrontations in the conflict. Reports indicated that dozens of combatants were killed, with Somaliland forces sustaining significant losses. General Tani of Somaliland's military reportedly admitted the heavy toll during the fighting.

== Aftermath ==
The Battle of Kalshaale resulted in heavy casualties on both sides, despite Somaliland pushing back attacking forces, neither faction achieved a decisive victory. The violence displaced local populations and further strained relations between Somaliland and the SSC militias. The fighting highlighted the ongoing instability in contested border regions between Somaliland and Puntland.

=== January 2012 clashes ===
Further clashes occurred in January 2012 between Somaliland forces and Khaatumo militias, with Somaliland forces led by General Mohamed Hasan Abdillahi (Jidhif) reportedly capturing Buuhoodle.
