= Odanleh =

Odanleh Coodanle
- Town
- Location in Somaliland Odanleh (Somaliland)
- Coordinates: 8°20′4.99″N 46°3′29.99″E
- Country: Somaliland
- Region: Togdheer
- District: Buhoodle District

Population (2006)
  - Total: 1,804
- Time zone: UTC+3 (EAT)

Odanleh, also spelt Odenleh (Somali: Coodanle) is a town in Buhoodle District, in the Togdheer region of Somaliland.

== Recent history ==
Relation map.

In September 2014, the Somaliland Ministry of Interior attempted to establish two polling stations in Qoorlugud and Odanleh to conduct registration for the elections, but the Qoorlugud district council rejected this registration.

In April 2015, the Ethiopian army arrested four men for murder in Odanleh. The murders are believed to have been caused by a clan conflict between the Qoorlugud and Buuhoodle.

In December 2016, Somaliland installed a vacuum-sealed well in Odanleh, and Buuhoodle Councilor Cisman Faarax Warsame (Jiciir) thanked to Somaliland President Ahmed Silanyo and Finance Secretary.

== Demographics ==
In June 2006 Odanleh had an estimated population of 1,804.
