= Tuulo Samakaab =

Tuulo Samakaab توولو سمكاب
- Village
- Location in Somalia
- Coordinates: 8°41′42.5″N 47°04′58.5″E
- Country: Somalia
- Regional State: Khatumo
- District: Las Anod

Area
  - Total: 1 km^{2} (0.39 sq mi)
  - Land: 1 km^{2} (0.39 sq mi)

Population (2019)
  - Total: 850
  - Density: 850/km^{2} (2,200/sq mi)
- Time zone: UTC+3 (EAT)

Samakaab or Tuulo Samakaab or Tuula Samakaab is a village in the Sool Region, currently under the control of North East State of Somalia forces. Tuulo is a Somali word meaning village.

It is situated in the middle of the road connecting Guumays and Las Anod. Furthermore, it serves as the starting point of the road that connects to the Buhoodle District.

== History ==
Relation map.
Ad=Adhi'adeye, Ay=Aynaba, Bu=Buuhoodle, Da=Dabataag, Go=Goonle, La=Las Anod, Si=Siixawle, Tu=Tuulo Samakaab, Wi=Widhwidh, Ya=Yagori

In August 2016, Somaliland President Silanyo visited Tuulo Samakaab and participated in the groundbreaking ceremony for the mother and child care center.

In June 2017, the Governor of Sool notified to the IDP camp residents to relocate from Kaamamka Dhiirigoob, Ceelmidgaan, Siixawle, and Kalberdaale to their previous residence, Yagori, Tuulo Samakaab, and Adhi'adeye, in accordance with an order from the Ministry of Interior.

In January 2018, Somaliland forces built new bases in Dabataag and Tuulo Samakaab to attack Khatumo forces.

In November 2018, Somaliland President Muse Bihi Abdi attended the project launch ceremony in Tuulo Samakaab.

In August 2019, reconstruction work began on the road between Tuulo Samakaab and Adhi'adeye, which was damaged by heavy rains.

In January 2020, Somaliland President Muse Bihi Abdi announced in his New Year's State of the Nation address that major repairs had been made to the roads connecting Las Anod, Tuula-Samakaab, and Adhi'adeye. The President said the same thing in his February speech to Parliament.

In October 2020, road construction began connecting Tuula Smakaab, Widhwidh and Goonle was started. Tuulo Smakaab is located in the middle of the main road that passes through the center of Somaliland and the Sool region, and when completed, this road will provide convenient transportation from the center of Somaliland to the Buhoodle District.

Tuulo Samakaab was captured on August 25, 2023, by Khatumo State (now North East State of Somalia) forces after successfully displacing Somaliland forces from Las Anod.

In July 2025, the president of North East State announced the closure of the Samakaab military training camp.
