= Siege of Las Anod (2023) =

2023 battle of the Las Anod conflict

Battle of Las Anod
- Part of the Las Anod conflict (2023)
Date	6 February 2023 – 25 August 2023
Location	Las Anod, Sool, Somalia
Result	SSC-Khatumo victory: Partial destruction of Las Anod
Territorial changes	Somaliland forces withdraw from Las Anod and Gooja'ade base

Belligerents
Somaliland	SSC-Khatumo

Commanders and leaders
(Somaliland) Muse Bihi Abdi (Somaliland) Faisal Bootaan (Somaliland) Nuh Ismail Tani	Abdikhadir Ahmed Aw-Ali: Jama Garad Ali

Strength
Unknown	Unknown

Casualties and losses
At least 200 killed	At least 2700 killed and 600 wounded

The Battle of Las Anod was the central military confrontation of the Las Anod conflict of 2023. Fighting began in early February 2023 after weeks of protests in Las Anod against Somaliland’s administration escalated into an armed uprising led by the SSC-Khatumo movement, which demanded reunification with the Federal Government of Somalia.

After months of heavy street fighting, shelling, and sieges, SSC forces declared full control over Las Anod in August 2023. Somaliland troops withdrew from their last major positions, including the Gooja’ade (Goojacade) military base on 25 August 2023, which was overrun by SSC fighters.

== Background ==
Las Anod, the capital of the Sool region, has been disputed between Somaliland and the Federal Government of Somalia since Somaliland's 1991 declaration of independence. The city is largely inhabited by the Dhulbahante clan, a branch of the Harti Darod, many of whom have opposed Somaliland's rule and instead supported union with Somalia.

Tensions escalated in late 2022 after a wave of assassinations of local figures triggered widespread protests. Demonstrators accused Somaliland authorities of failing to provide security, while also demanding greater political representation and the withdrawal of Somaliland's military presence.

== Prelude ==
By early 2023, protests in Las Anod turned increasingly violent after Somaliland security forces opened fire on demonstrators, causing civilian deaths.

On 5 February 2023, Dhulbahante elders and leaders announced the formation of SSC-Khatumo, a pro-union administration rejecting Somaliland's authority and declaring alignment with the Federal Government of Somalia.

In response, Somaliland deployed thousands of reinforcements to Sool, fortifying positions in and around Las Anod to suppress the uprising.

== Battle ==
Full-scale fighting erupted on 6 February 2023 when SSC-Khatumo fighters engaged Somaliland forces in Las Anod. The conflict was characterized by urban combat and shelling, which caused extensive damage to civilian neighborhoods and medical facilities.

Amnesty International reported that by April 2023, more than 100 people had been killed and over 600 injured, including civilians, in the clashes.

The battle culminated on 25 August 2023 when SSC forces stormed the Gooja’ade (Goojacade) military base outside Las Anod, forcing a retreat of Somaliland's remaining units.

== Withdrawal ==
On 25 August 2023, Somaliland forces withdrew from their defensive positions around Las Anod, including the key Gooja’ade base. The retreat was confirmed by multiple reports, which described the pullout as a major turning point in the conflict.

The withdrawal left the SSC-Khatumo forces in full control of Las Anod and surrounding areas, consolidating their authority in the Sool region.

== Aftermath ==
Following the loss of Gooja’ade, Somaliland troops fully withdrew from Las Anod and surrounding areas, leaving the city under SSC-Khatumo control.

The conflict displaced more than 200,000 civilians, creating a humanitarian emergency across Sool and neighboring regions.

Politically, the loss of Las Anod was seen as a major setback for Somaliland, undermining its territorial claims in eastern regions and strengthening SSC-Khatumo's position. Analysts noted that the events marked one of the most serious challenges to Somaliland's authority since its self-declared independence in 1991.

== See also ==
- Las Anod conflict (2023)
