= Battle of Erigavo =

2024 battle in Erigavo, Somaliland

- Part of Las Anod conflict
Date	December 14–15, 2024
Location	Erigavo, Sanaag, Somaliland
Result	Somaliland victory
Territorial changes	Somaliland retains control over Erigavo

Belligerents
Somaliland; SSB	SSC-Khatumo

Commanders and leaders
(Somaliland) Ahmed Abdi Muse; (Somaliland) Naasir Meecaad	(Khatumo) Abdi Madoobe (WIA) (Khatumo) Maxamed Waranle † (Khatumo) Jamaal Farangaag † (Khatumo) Gurey Cismaan †

Strength
Unknown	Unknown

The Battle of Erigavo was an engagement between Somaliland forces and SSC-Khaatumo militants that occurred on December 14–15, 2024, in the city of Erigavo, capital of the Sanaag region in eastern Somaliland. The battle resulted in a decisive Somaliland victory, with its administration retaining control of the strategically important city. The conflict led to substantial displacement, with nearly 43,000 residents fleeing the area.

== Background ==
In March 1991, towards the end of the Somaliland War of Independence, the SNM took control over the Sanaag region, including its administrative seat of Erigavo from Barre regime loyalists. Erigavo was at the hands of the Habr Yunis and the Habr Je'lo clans of the Isaaq clan family, with the Darod clans, consisting of the Warsangeli and the Dhulbahante, fleeing the town back to their traditional territories on the account of being associated with the Barre regime fighting the Isaaq. Peace was restored after the SNM-brokered Sanaag Grand Peace and Reconciliation Conference.

Erigavo, a strategic city in Somaliland’s Sanaag region, has historically been a flashpoint for tensions between Somaliland and the SSC-Khaatumo administration, which seeks autonomy within Somalia. SSC-Khaatumo, formed in 2023, rejects Somaliland’s claims over the Sool, Sanaag, and Cayn (SSC) regions and has sought to expand its territorial control after Somaliland forces withdrew from Las Anod in 2023. SSC-Khaatumo has accused Somaliland of oppressing local populations, while Somaliland has stressed its military presence as necessary to maintain order and sovereignty.

Underlying clan rivalries and disputes over governance exacerbated tensions. In August 2024, the killing of an SSC-Khaatumo fighter near Erigavo ignited initial clashes between local militias in Goof, 40 kilometres from Erigavo, leaving 7–9 dead. Fighting also broke out in Erigavo on 26 November between Somaliland security forces and armed groups, leading to nine deaths and multiple injuries, after which Somaliland's interior minister imposed a curfew and ordered arrests in response. This incident set the stage for broader confrontations, compounded by Somaliland’s military mobilization and SSC-Khaatumo’s determination to challenge its authority.

Tensions reached a boiling point in December 2024, following months of sporadic clashes and political disagreements over control of the Sanaag region. On December 14, violent clashes erupted in Erigavo as both sides mobilized their forces to assert dominance over the city. The fighting was described as some of the fiercest seen in the region in recent years.

== The Battle ==
The battle began early on December 14, when SSC-Khaatumo forces launched a coordinated assault on Somaliland positions within Erigavo. Local reports indicate that the fighting concentrated in the northern and eastern parts of the city, with both sides deploying heavy weaponry. Civilians were caught in the crossfire, and hospitals in the region were overwhelmed with casualties.

According to multiple sources, the clashes resulted in "at least seven deaths and scores of injuries" among combatants and civilians. The United Nations Office for the Coordination of Humanitarian Affairs (OCHA) later reported that nearly 43,000 people were displaced as a result of the fighting.

=== Somaliland's Counteroffensive ===
Somaliland forces, backed by SSB civil militias, mounted a counteroffensive on December 15, pushing SSC-Khatumo fighters out of the city, with SSC-Khatumo fighters fully withdrawing by the next day. Governor Muse declared victory, stating: "The army has orders to take strict action against anyone looting houses. Civilians carrying weapons will be arrested immediately."

The Somaliland administration claimed to have fully secured the city by December 15 and began implementing measures to prevent further instability, including confiscating weapons from civilians and establishing tighter security protocols.

== Aftermath ==
The aftermath of the battle left Erigavo heavily scarred, with widespread destruction reported in parts of the city. Civilians described the clashes as "terrifying," with many fleeing to nearby towns such as Ceel Afweyn and Laasqoray to escape the violence. The entire Harti Darod population of Erigavo fled the town.

Governor Ahmed Abdi Muse declared that Somaliland forces had successfully "repelled the enemy and restored order to Erigavo." However, SSC-Khaatumo leadership vowed to continue their struggle for control of the Sanaag region, with one leader stating: "Erigavo remains a contested city, and we will not stop until it is liberated from Somaliland occupation."

=== Casualties ===
The exact number of casualties remains unclear, but reports confirm at least seven combatants were killed during the fighting. Local hospitals reported receiving dozens of injured civilians and fighters.

== Reactions ==
The Somaliland government accused SSC-Khaatumo of inciting violence and undermining peace efforts in the Sanaag region. Meanwhile, SSC-Khaatumo leaders blamed Somaliland for the clashes, accusing them of targeting local populations.

The Federal Government of Somalia called for an immediate ceasefire and urged both parties to prioritize dialogue over armed confrontation.

== See also ==
- 2024 Buhodle clashes
- Battle of Jiidali
- Las Anod conflict
