= Guumays =

Guumays جوميس
- Village
- Location in Somalia
- Coordinates: 8°51′02.8″N 46°47′53.3″E
- Country: Somalia
- Regional State: Khatumo
- District: Aynabo
- Time zone: UTC+3 (EAT)

Guumays (Guumeys) is a village in the Sool region currently under the control of Khatumo State forces.

== History ==
Relation map.
Ad=Adhi'adeye, Ay=Aynaba, Gu=Guumays, La=Las Anod, Oo=Oog, Tu=Tuulo Samakaab, Ya=Yagori

Guumays is listed in a book published in England in 1951 under the name Gumeis.

After Puntland gained independence in 1998, the Somaliland militia's area of operations extended to Guumays and the Puntland militia's area of operations extended to Las Anod.

In July 2005, the Somaliland National Electoral Commission inspected the situation in Yagori District and reported that elections could be held in Guumays, Yagori, Tuuolo-Samakaab, and Adhi'adeye.

In July 2011, the Somaliland government reported the completion of a 65-kilometer road connecting Las Anod and Guumays as an achievement of the past three months.

In January 2014, Somaliland Interior Minister Ali Mohamed Warancadde visited Guumays to end inter-clan strife.

In June 2015, one person was killed in Guumays due to clan conflict, and the Somaliland government dispatched a minister.

In August 2015, Somaliland Public Works Minister Abdirisak Khalif held a rally in Aynaba to end the clan wars around Guumays.

In April 2016, Somaliland's Minister of Water Resources visited the towns surrounding Las Anod, including Guumays.

In July 2016, the Somaliland military carried out an operation in eastern Somaliland to detect and prevent alcohol and drug abuse. The operation was executed with emphasis on Guumays.

In April 2017, Ethiopians kidnapped by armed groups were released in Guumays. The commander of the Sool State Police warned residents not to support the kidnappers.

In November 2017, UCID party leader Faysal Ali Warabe visited Guumays and was welcomed.

In February 2019, large areas of eastern Somaliland experienced water shortages, and Guumays were reported to be particularly affected.

In January 2021, Waddani party chairman Abdirahman Mohamed Abdullahi visited Guumays. In February, Kulmiye party member and Minister of Foreign Affairs Yasin Haji Mohamoud visited Guumays for the same purpose.

In March 2022, Somaliland Vice President Abdirahman Saylici visited the facilities outside Guumays.

On 25 August 2023, according to SSC members, Guuumays, along with other surrounding towns, was captured by SSC after the Somaliland military base in Goojacade was occupied by SSC.

On 25 September 2023, it was reported that Somaliland troops in Oog and SSC-Khatumo troops in Guuumays stared at each other.
