= Law enforcement in Djibouti =

Djibouti (Arabic: جيبوتي Jībūtī, Somali: Jabuuti), officially the Republic of Djibouti, is a country in the Horn of Africa. It is bordered by Eritrea in the north, Ethiopia in the west and south, and Somalia in the southeast. The remainder of the border is formed by the Red Sea and the Gulf of Aden. The main police force is the Djibouti National Police and Djiboutian National Gendarmerie

== Secret police organizations ==
- Gendarmerie Special Research Brigade (Brigade Spéciale de Recherche de la Gendarmerie, BSRG)
- Documentation and Security Service (Service de Documentation et de Sedimentation, SDS)

== Sources ==
- Das, Dilip K.; Palmiotto, Michael (2004). World Police Encyclopedia. Taylor & Francis. ISBN 0-415-94251-9
- Kurian, George Thomas (2006). World Encyclopedia of Police Forces and Correctional Systems (2nd ed.). Thomson Gale. ISBN 0-7876-7738-8
- Sullivan, Larry E. (2005). Encyclopedia of Law Enforcement: International. Thousand Oaks: Sage Publications. ISBN 0-7619-2649-6
