= Jidali =

Jidali Jiidali
- Town
- Location in Somaliland Jidali (Somaliland)
- Coordinates: 10.700789°N 47.664954°E
- Country Somaliland: Somaliland
- Region: Sanaag
- District: Erigavo District

Population (2002)
  - Total: 1,500
- Time zone: UTC+3 (EAT)

Jidali (Somali: Jiidali) is a town in the Sanaag region of Somaliland.

== Overview ==
Jidali is located north east of the provincial capital Erigavo.

The grave of Zubeyr Awal, the eponymous ancestor of the Habr Awal, is also located in the town. The town is approximately 100 km east of the tomb of his grandfather Sheikh Ishaaq bin Ahmed, the founding father of the Isaaq clan family, whose tomb is located in the coastal town of Maydh.

== History ==
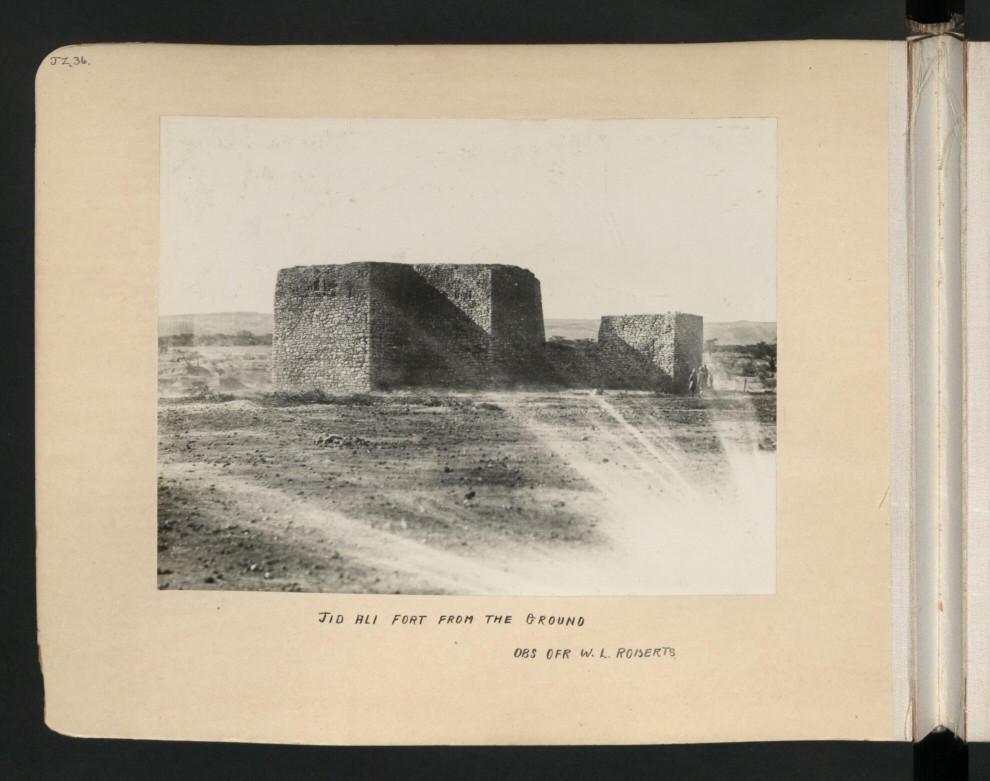
Jid Ali Fort from the ground. OBS OFR W.L. Roberts

Jiidali was one of many temporary headquarters of the Dervish movement led by Mohammed Abdullah Hassan, to which him and his forces fled to after their defeat in Jidbali. The town is home to a fort used by the Dervishes to threaten the coast inhabited by the Warsangeli, a tribe friendly to the British. The Jidali fort was a cross-shaped fort of was also the first place in Africa to be bombed via aerial bombardment by a tally of four sorties of De Havilland DH-9's on 21 January 1920.

=== Siege of Jidali ===
In late April 1916, the Warsangeli under the orders of Mohamoud Ali Shire attacked the Dervish forces based at the Jidali fort, besieging them and looting their stock. With news of the assault having reached the Dervish of Cershida and Surut, reinforcements were sent to Jidali to repulse the attackers, where the Warsangeli were defeated and the Dervishes managed to recover their stock.

On the evening of Saturday the 6th, the Dervishes set out to punish the Warsangeli with a force composed of 2,000 Sa'ad Yunis and Uduruhmin Dervishes led by Ibrahim Boghol, a commander of the Adan Madoba sub-division of the Habr Je'lo clan, who swept down on the Warsangeli capital, Las Khorey. Ibrahim's forces captured the eastern portion of the town, killing many Warsangeli fighters. The force managed to surround the settlement and capture the only source of water, causing many to die of thirst. While Las Khorey was being besieged, the Warsangeli were able to secretly send a dhow to Aden to request help from the British Navy, and on May 10 Lancelot Turton commanding HMS Northbrook arrived at Las Khorey and commenced to shell Ibrahim and his forces with Lyddite explosives, forcing them to retreat to the mountains and thus ending the deadly siege.

=== Recent ===
In March 2024, the Somaliland Ministry of Agriculture provided farming equipment to farmers in the town of Jiidali to enforce the farmers work.

== Demographics ==
According to a book published in England in 1951, the town was inhabited by people from Muse Ismail clan of Habar Yoonis, Ogadyahen Siad clan of Dhulbahante, and a minority group, Nub Omr, Hinjiyeh clan of Warsangali.

Michael Walls in the book Peace in Somaliland: an indigenous approach to state-building reports;

Jiidali had long been a Dhulbahante town, but the Habar Yoonis had occupied the area after the Dhulbahante retreat to Sool following the Damalahagare conflict. For this reason, the Dhulbahante were offended when the town was selected as the venue for the meeting and subsequently held a grudge against the Warsangeli for agreeing to meet

— Michael Walls, Peace in Somaliland : an indigenous approach to state-building

Ahmed Yusuf Farah and I. M. Lewis report in the book Somalia, the Roots of Reconciliation:

In 1992, the first gu' rains had fallen at the Habar Yonis side of the previously mixed Jiideli area in district Erigavo

Members of the Habr Awal clan frequent this town on pilgrimage to pay siyaro to the grave of their ancestor and forefather Zubeyr Awal.
