= Tukaraq =

- Town

- Sool in Somalia Tukaraq (Africa)
- Coordinates: 8°32′52″N 47°49′58″E
- Country: Somalia
- Region: Sool
- District: Lasanod
- Time zone: UTC+3 (EAT)

Tukaraq is a small town in the eastern Sool region of Somalia. The town is located on the road between Las Anod and Garowe in Las Anod District. Khatumo State has had effective control there since 2023, but Puntland also has a territorial claim.

== History ==
The name "Tukerak" appears in a book published in England in 1951, and its coordinates are given as 8°32′N 47°47′19″E, rather close to today's Las Anod.

In August 1997, a water project was also implemented in Tukaraq as part of UNICEF's "Las-Anod water project".

=== Puntland military base ===
In October 2007, Somaliland forces entered Las Anod, previously controlled by Puntland, and the Puntland forces withdrew 50 kilometers east to Tukaraq without a fight.

On May 30, 2011, Somaliland forces sortied from a base in Maraaga, 5 kilometers from the city of Las Anod, and engaged in battle with Puntland forces in the village of Higladda, 20 kilometers west of Tukaraq. And SSC militiamen led by Ahmed Elmi Osman fought with Somaliland forces. Local residents said that both Somaliland and Puntland forces were killed, but the leaders of both forces denied it.

In 2012, the SSC militia established a temporary customs office in Tukaraq.

In April 2012, Khatumo State forces attacked a Somaliland military base outside Tukaraq, but were repulsed by Somaliland forces.

In June 2012, Khatumo State forces captured Tukaraq, which was controlled by Puntland forces. A few days later, Somaliland forces withdrew the Khatumo forces, but they turned back to their stronghold in Las Anod. A few hours later, Puntland forces occupied Tukaraq. It is said that on this occasion, the Somaliland forces received a large sum of money at Puntland's request and withdrew the Khatumo army.

In November 2013, Puntland and Khatumo forces engaged in a battle in northern Tukaraq, which was won by Puntland forces.

In December 2014, soldiers revolted after the Puntland government failed to pay soldiers facing Somaliland for four months and failed to supply them with oil and other supplies.

In April 2015, the Puntland government sent a team including an obstetrician to Tukaraq.

In May 2015, Puntland increased its forces in Tukaraq.

=== Capture by Somaliland ===
On 8 January 2018, Somaliland forces occupied Tukaraq after heavy fighting with Puntland forces. This was ordered by the President of Somaliland immediately after the elections. This successfully prevented Somaliland from getting goods from Bosaso in Puntland to Las Anod. Puntland moved the customs location to Faliidhyaale, 25 kilometers east of Tukaraq. The incident resulted in several deaths and nearly 15,000 displaced persons.

In late January 2018, the Vice President of Somaliland visited Tukaraq.

On 15 May 2018 intense increase in military activity occurred between rival Puntland and Somaliland armed forces in the surrounding area of Tukaraq. Both Somaliland and Puntland have accused the other of initiating the violence.

On 24 May 2018 rival groups between Somaliland and Puntland, both participating in the ongoing conflict in the Sool region, released press statements claiming that the opposing side had launched a predawn offensive around 05:30 AM local time. According to a 2022 USAID report, this is seen as the last full-scale battle between Somaliland and Puntland.

In November 2018, The United Nations envoy to Somalia visited Puntland and Somaliland to explain to their respective presidents the need for a peaceful solution to the problems occurring in Tukaraq.

In March 2020, the Vice President of Puntland visits the Puntland military base outside Tukaraq.

In September 2022, the President of Somaliland visited Tukaraq.

=== 2023 Las Anod conflict ===
In February 2023, Somaliland troops withdraw from Tukaraq. They traveled west about 50 kilometers to a base outside of Las Anod.

However, in March 2023, the Somalia news website Hiiraan Online introduced that "Tukaraq has been effectively controlled by Somaliland since 2018."

In April 2023, SSC-Khatumo cut off traffic between Tukaraq and Gambadhe.

In July 2023, Somaliland's Interior Minister Mohamed Kahin Ahmed accused the Puntland government of sending troops to Tukaraq.

In August 2023, American conservative think tank Hudson Institute reported that the flags of Somalia, Puntland, and SSC are flying in the center of Tukaraq.

== Demographics ==
The town's main inhabitants belong to the Dhulbahante tribe of the Darod, with the Ugadhyahan sub-clans of the Mohamoud Garad such as the Galool Oriye affiliated lineages of the Nur Ahmed and Wacays Abdulle, as well as with the sub-lineages belonging to the Naleye Ahmed are well represented.

== See also ==
- Administrative divisions of Somaliland
- Regions of Somaliland
- Districts of Somaliland
- Somalia–Somaliland border
