= Buurmadow =

Somali clan elder

- Cismaan Aw Maxamuud
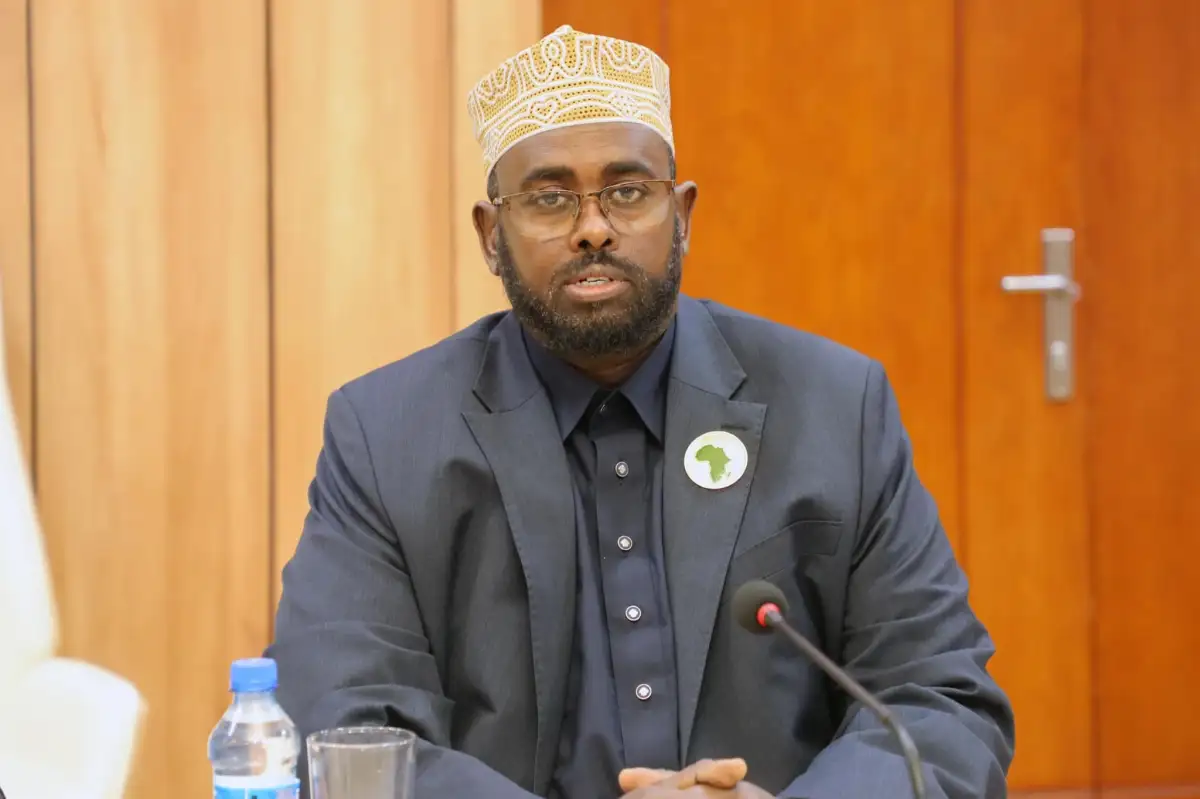
- Born: Osman Aw Mohamud; 1965 (age 60–61); El Afweyn, Sanaag, Somali Republic (now Somaliland)
- Other name: Buurmadow
- Occupation: Clan elder

Boqor Osman Aw Mohamud (Somali: Cismaan Aw Maxamuud), more commonly known as Buurmadow is clan elder Boqor from Somaliland.

== Biography ==
Mohamud was born in 1964 in El Afweyn, in the Sanaag region of Somaliland to a family of nomads, with his father being a livestock trader. He belongs to the Musa Abokor sub-division of the Habr Je'lo Isaaq.

He graduated from University in 1986 where he studied law. He later joined the Somali Salvation Democratic Front, a rebel group with the goal of overthrowing Siad Barre's regime shortly after. In 1984 he subsequently joined the Somali National Movement, another rebel group with a similar goal. After the conclusion of the war and throughout the 1990s Mohamud was a business man.

In 2000, he was crowned a boqor, or king, in Somali. Mohamud is known for his efforts at mediating regional conflicts, particularly among clans in Somaliland. He earned fame as a mediator between Abdullahi Yusuf, the first and founding president of the Puntland region in northern Somalia and Mohamud Muse Hersi in the dispute over the presidency in Puntland between 2002 and 2003. With the help of his mediation, a peace agreement that prevented Puntland from an all out civil war and guaranteed its stability for the coming years was finally signed in May 2003. Mohamud has since then been considered a man with great influence and with good connections to the governments of both Somaliland and Puntland.

On 17 November 2011, he was arrested in the United Arab Emirates (UAE), visiting his wife who resides there while returning from a pilgrimage to Mecca. The government never offered formal charges against him, prompting Amnesty International to issue an alert on his behalf; the group later speculated that UAE had arrested him at the prompting of Somaliland authorities. Mohamud was released on 5 January 2012.

Upon returning to Somaliland on 15 March, Mohamud was arrested at the airport in Hargeisa. After forty days of detention, the local government charged him with what it termed "anti-national activity of a citizen abroad”, "subversive or anti-national propaganda" and "continuing offence" in response to a comment he had made while in the UAE criticizing a trip to China by President Ahmed Mahamoud Silanyo of Somaliland. On 8 July, these charges were dismissed and replaced by a charge of "insulting a public official", of which the judge found Mohamud guilty. Mohamud was subsequently sentenced to one year in prison for defamation, according to local law based on the colonial period British Somaliland penal code. Amnesty International responded by declaring Mohamud a prisoner of conscience, detained "for exercising his right to freedom of expression". On 18 July, the Somaliland government pardoned Mohamud, apparently in response to international pressure, and he returned to his home in Hargeisa.
