= Gambadhe =

- Town
- Location in Somalia
- Coordinates: 8.5673°N 47.6012°E
- Country: Somalia
- Regional State: Khatumo
- Region: Sool
- District: Las Anod
- Time zone: UTC+3 (EAT)

Gambadhe is a town in the Sool region of Ssc-Khaatumo. A dry port has been constructed in the town. The town is located roughly 30km southeast of the city of Las Anod.

== History ==
A couple of kilometers southwest of Gambadhe is the currently abandoned locality of Dari ali which is a Daraawiish heritage site. This site previously hosted a fort called Daryare which was used as an escape route and to safeguard against the three colonial adversaries of the Darawiish, namely Britain, Abyssinia and Italy. Although currently a ruin, it was previously located between the ring of Darawiish forts at Taleex and the Darawiish fort at Las Anod.

The visit of President Puntland to Taleh in late August 2013 led to a resurgence of local insurgency. Fighting also broke out in Gambadhe on September 13 and 15 between pro-Khatumo State militias and the Somaliland army.

In June 2015, the Somaliland army commander inspected Somaliland military bases in Xudun, Gambadhe, and Kalabaydh in Sool region.

In March 2019, fighting broke out between the Somaliland army and local forces in Gambadhe led by Colonel Faysal Falaalug. Faysal Falaalug militias, calling itself the SSC Liberation Front, also attacked Somaliland troops in April, but was repulsed.

In January 2020, the government of Somaliland and the state of Sool will jointly establish a dry port in Gambadhe to send goods from the Berbera port to Somalia, and the Somaliland port administrator and the governor of Sool participated in the groundbreaking ceremony.
