= Somaliland National Army =

Land warfare branch of Somaliland's military

- Ciidanka Qaranka Soomaaliland الجيش الصوماليلاندي
- Founded: 2005
- Country: Somaliland
- Allegiance: Constitution of Somaliland
- Type: Army
- Role: Land warfare
- Size: 8,000–15,000 (est.); ~25,000 (government claim, 2026) Military age: 18
- Part of: Somaliland Armed Forces
- Garrison/HQ: Hargeisa, Somaliland
- Mottos: "Allaa Mahad Leh, شكرا للاله"; Thanks be to God
- Colors: Green, Red, White
- Anniversaries: 27 February
- Engagements: Somali Civil War; Somaliland War of Independence; Puntland–Somaliland dispute Battle of Las Anod (2007); Somali Civil War (2009–present); 2010 Ayn clashes Battle of Tukaraq; Las Anod conflict 2024 Buhodle clashes Battle of Erigavo

Commanders
- President of Somaliland: Abdirahman Mohamed Abdullahi
- Minister of Defense: Rooble Muse Abdi
- Colonel of the Regiment: Brigadier General Nimcaan Yusuf Osman

Insignia
- Emblem

- Beret and cap badge

- Patch

The Somaliland National Army (Somali: Ciidanka Qaranka Soomaaliland, Arabic: الجيش الصوماليلاندي) is the land force and largest branch of the Somaliland Armed Forces, based in the Somaliland capital of Hargeisa. The Somaliland National Army is composed entirely of professionals and volunteers, as the state does not mandate conscription. Some Somaliland battalions operate near the Puntland border due to a border dispute.

The total strength of the Somaliland army has been estimated at between 8,000 and 15,000 soldiers. In September 2026, President Abdirahman Mohamed Abdullahi stated that the army numbered about 25,000 soldiers, alongside a coast guard of around 1,500 personnel. In early 2026, more than 6,000 newly trained soldiers graduated into the army following a training programme in the Sool region. In 2025 the government began an iris-based biometric registration of all security forces to remove "ghost" personnel from the payroll.

== History ==
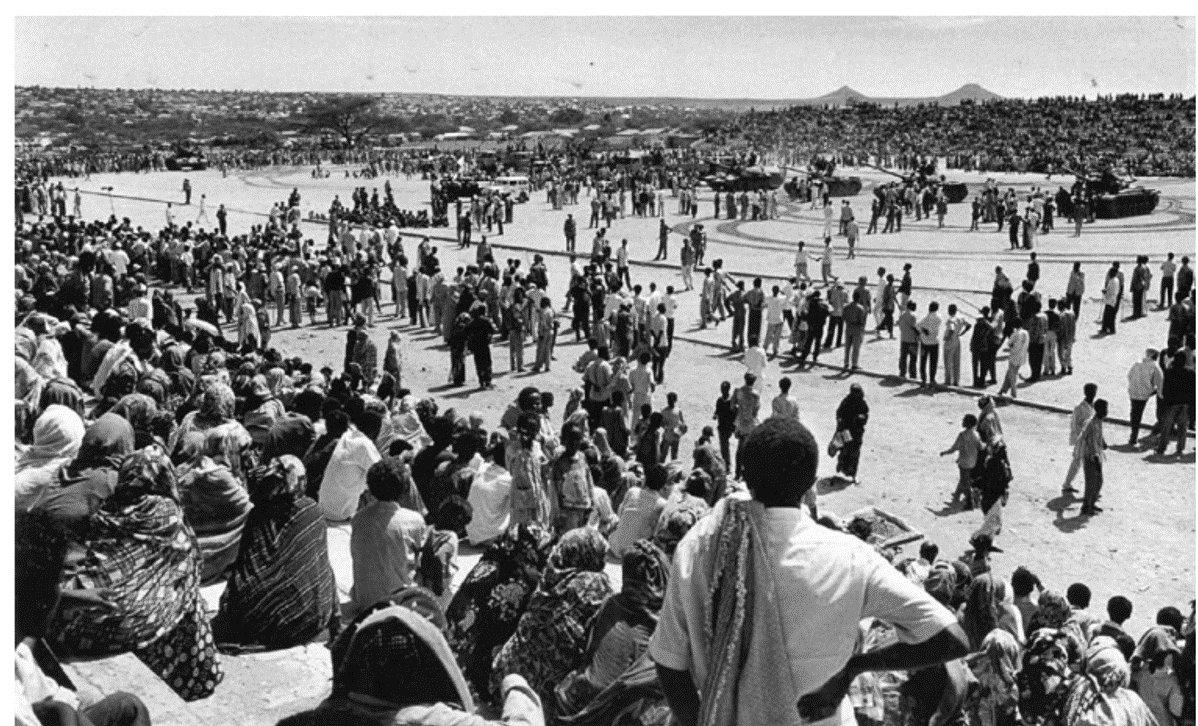
Somaliland Peace Process

The history of the Somaliland army dates back to the Protectorate era, which was founded by the British Army as the Somaliland Camel Corps in the 20th. In 1941 World War II Italy invaded British Somaliland. In December 1941 after the liberation of British Somaliland from Italy. Somaliland Scouts has dissolution of the Somaliland Camel Corps in 1942, which was formerly tasked with the defense of the protectorate.

The Somaliland National Army was established in 1993 and was established by the Somaliland reconciliation.

== Structure ==
The Somaliland Army is governed by the Ministry of Defence, and headquartered in Hargeisa. The Somaliland Armed Forces' Chief of Staff's office is in Hargeisa. He is the Chief of Staff of the Army, as well as the Navy and Air Forces, although the latter two typically report to the Ministry of Defence.

The Army currently operates 5 Divisions across 2 military regions. Each Division is equipped with a mechanised brigade with 3 specifically equipped with artillery batteries.

There were an estimated 8,000 soldiers in the army according to Somaliland Chief of Staff General Nuh Ismail Tani during an interview in 2019. The International Institute for Strategic Studies 2024 global military balance study observed that there were around 12,500 soldiers in the Somaliland army.

Each Division consists of 3 light infantry brigades.

- Army Command HQ- Birjeex (Hargeisa)
  - 31st Division (Qeybta 31aad)
    - JSL 31st Infantry Brigade (Qeyta 31aad Ee Hargeisa)
    - JSL Specialised Infantry Battalion
    - JSL Mechanized Brigade
    - JSL Commandos Regiment (Ciidamada Kamaandowsta)
    - JSL Army Band
    - JSL Tank Brigade
  - 12th Division (Qeybta 12aad) Burco
    - JSL 12th Infantry Brigade (Qeyta 12aad Ee Burco)
    - JSL Mechanized Battalion
    - JSL Field Artillery Corps (Xeerada Gaaska Ee Burco)
  - 3rd Division (Qeybta 3aad) Ceerigaabo
    - JSL 3rd Infantry Brigade (Qeyta 3aad Ee Ceerigaabo)
    - JSL Mechanized Battalion
    - JSL Commandos Regiment ( Ciidamada Kamaandowsta)
  - 7th Division (Qeybta 7aad) Laascaanood – Taliska Guud Ee Aaga Bari Goojacade
    - JSL 7th Infantry Brigade (Qeyta 7aad Ee Laascaanood)
    - JSL Tank Brigade
    - JSL Commandos Regiment (Ciidamada Kamaandowsta)
    - JSL Specialised Infantry Battalion
    - JSL Field Artillery Corps (Xeerada Gaaska Ee Goojacade)
  - 19th Division (Qeybta 19aad) Goroyo Cawl
    - JSL Specialised Infantry Battalion
    - JSL Mechanized Battalion

== Equipment ==
=== Small arms ===
Name	Type	Origin	Notes
Assault rifles and battle rifles
AK-47	Assault rifle	Soviet Union	Imported from Ethiopia and Yemen
AKM	Assault rifle	Soviet Union	Imported from Ethiopia and Yemen
AK-74	Assault rifle	Soviet Union	Imported from Ethiopia and Yemen
AK-103	Assault rifle	Russia	Imported from Ethiopia
CAR 816	Assault rifle	United Arab Emirates	Imported from the UAE
M4	Carbine	United States	Source unknown
FN FNC	Assault rifle	Belgium	Source unknown
FN FAL	Battle rifle	Belgium	Source unknown
Heckler & Koch G3	Battle rifle	Germany	
Sidearms
IWI Masada	Pistol	Israel	Sourced from Ethiopia
TT pistol	Pistol	Soviet Union	Seized after the Somaliland War of Independence
MP-443 Grach	Pistol	Russia	Source unknown
Sniper rifles
Dragunov	Designated marksman rifle	Soviet Union	Seized after the Somaliland War of Independence
Steyr HS .50	Anti-materiel rifle	Austria	Seen at the 2026 HEEGAN Military Excersise
Machine guns
RPK-74	Light machine gun	Soviet Union	Seized after the Somaliland War of Independence
PK	General-purpose machine gun	Soviet Union	Seized after the Somaliland War of Independence
DShK	Heavy machine gun	Soviet Union	Seized after the Somaliland War of Independence
NSV	Heavy machine gun	Soviet Union	Seized after the Somaliland War of Independence
Anti-tank weapons
RPG-7	Rocket-propelled grenade	Russia	Seized after the Somaliland War of Independence
RPG-22	Anti-tank rocket	Russia	
Ceremonial
SKS	Drill rifle	Soviet Union	Seized after the Somaliland War of Independence

=== Vehicles ===
Name	Type	Origin	Quantity	Notes
Main battle tanks
T-72B	Main battle tank	Soviet Union	Unknown	
T-55A	Main battle tank	Soviet Union	87	42+ operational; 1974–1976 production
T-54B	Main battle tank	Soviet Union	40	31+ operational; 1974–1976 production
Armoured fighting vehicles
Tygor-E2	Armoured vehicle	United Arab Emirates	5+	
Fiat 6614	Armoured personnel carrier	Italy	5+	
Fiat 6616	Armoured car	Italy	4+	1+ with 20 mm turret; 3+ with 20 mm turret and UB-16 rocket pods
Transport and utility vehicles
Toyota Land Cruiser J79	Light utility vehicle	Japan	Unknown	
Toyota Hilux	Pickup truck	Japan	Unknown	
Humvee	Light utility vehicle	United States	Unknown	
M939	Cargo truck	United States	Unknown	6×6
Renault GBC-180	Cargo truck	France	Unknown	6×6
Sinotruk Howo	Troop transport	China	100+	

=== Artillery and air defence ===
Name	Type	Origin	Calibre	Notes
Multiple rocket launchers
BM-21 Grad	Multiple rocket launcher	Soviet Union	122 mm	Estimated 100 in service
Humvee	Multiple rocket launcher	United States	—	
Towed artillery
D-44	Field gun	Soviet Union	85 mm	
M101	Howitzer	United States	105 mm	
D-30	Howitzer	Soviet Union	122 mm	
D-74	Field gun	Soviet Union	122 mm	
M-46	Field gun	Soviet Union	130 mm	
Mortars
M224	Light mortar	United States	60 mm	
M1938	Heavy mortar	Soviet Union	120 mm	
Anti-aircraft guns
ZU-23-2	Twin autocannon	Soviet Union	23 mm	
ZPU-4	Quad heavy machine gun	Soviet Union	14.5 mm	

=== Camouflage ===
Digital camouflage pattern of the Somaliland National Army

The army's primary field uniform uses a locally produced digital camouflage pattern.

== Ranks ==
Rank group	General / flag officers			Senior officers			Junior officers
Somaliland National Army
Somaliland National Army	Sareeye guud	Sareeye gaas	Sareeye guuto	Gashaanle sare	Gashaanle dhexe	Gashaanle	Dhamme	Laba xídígle	Xídígle

Rank group	Senior NCOs					Junior NCOs		Enlisted
Somaliland National Army								No insignia
Somaliland National Army	Chief warrant officer Musharax sarkaal	Warrant officer class 1 Sadex xarígle	Warrant officer class 2 Laba xarígle	Warrant officer class 3 Xarígle	Sergeant; Sadex alífle	Corporal; Laba alífle	Lance corporal Alífle	Private (or equivalent); Dable

== Gallery ==
Wheeled armoured personnel carriers on parade

Truck towing a field gun

Soldiers riding in a pickup truck in digital camouflage

Sinotruk trucks carrying twin-barrelled anti-aircraft guns

Armoured vehicles on parade

Armoured pickup trucks on parade

Soldiers marching past with an officer saluting

Helmeted infantry with goggles and body armour

Red-beret troops marching

== Combat history ==
=== Somaliland War of Independence ===
The Somaliland War of Independence (Somali: Dagaalkii Xoraynta Soomaaliland, lit. 'Somaliland Liberation War') was a rebellion waged by the Somali National Movement against the ruling military junta in Somalia led by General Siad Barre lasting from its founding on 6 April 1981 and ended on 18 May 1991 when the SNM declared what was then northern Somalia independent as the Republic of Somaliland. The conflict served as the main theatre of the larger Somali Rebellion that started in 1978. The conflict was in response to the harsh policies enacted by the Barre regime against the main clan family in Somaliland, the Isaaq, including a declaration of economic warfare on the Isaaq. These harsh policies were put into effect shortly after the conclusion of the disastrous Ogaden war in 1978.

During the ongoing conflict between the forces of the Somali National Movement and the Somali Army, the Somali government's genocidal campaign against the Isaaq took place between May 1988 and March 1989, with explicit aims of handling the "Isaaq problem", Barre ordered the shelling and aerial bombardment of the major cities in the northwest and the systematic destruction of Isaaq dwellings, settlements and water points. The Siad Barre regime targeted civilian members of the Isaaq group specifically, especially in the cities of Hargeisa and Burao and to that end employed the use of indiscriminate artillery shelling and aerial bombardment against civilian populations belonging to the Isaaq clan.

=== Puntland–Somaliland dispute ===
The Puntland–Somaliland dispute is a territorial dispute over the provinces of Sool, Sanaag and the Buuhoodle district of Togdheer region between the self-declared Republic of Somaliland and the Puntland state of Somalia. The territory was historically part of British Somaliland, a British protectorate that granted independence in 1960 and then formed a union with neighboring Italian colony Trust Territory of Somaliland to form the Somali Republic. When the Somaliland War of Independence was concluded and the Somali Civil War broke out, Somaliland declared independence from Somalia in 1991 as a successor state to the British protectorate and declared independence from Somalia.

The dispute started in 1998, when Puntland was formed as an autonomous state of Somalia and declared the region as part of its territory based on tribal affiliation of the locals.

=== Battle of Las Anod ===
The Battle of Las Anod saw Somaliland forces engage Puntland forces in Las Anod, capital of the Sool region. The ensuing battle resulted in Somaliland ousting the Puntland army from the city. Las Anod had until then been controlled by Puntland, who took control of the regional capital in 2002.

Somaliland had however been aiding local clan militias opposed to Puntland presence in the city. The clan militias were loyal to Ahmed Abdi Habsade, a former Puntland minister who later on defected to Somaliland. In October 2007, the conflict mushroomed into a regional conflict over control of the city of Las Anod, as Somaliland regular army forces mobilized from their base in the town of Adhicadeeye, west of the city, and entered the conflict. Puntland was slow to mobilize a counter-attack, as Puntland's weak economy and overstretched military obligations in Mogadishu prevented a rapid response. After assuming control of the city on October 15, Somaliland moved Sool's regional administration into Las Anod. Between 10 and 20 people were reported to be dead.

=== 2010 Ayn clashes ===
The 2010 Ayn clashes saw Somaliland forces engage Dulbahante clan militia in the Buuhoodle district. The battle was prompted by Ethiopian troops seizing a truck belonging to locals in Buuhoodle, sparking a response from residents and Ethiopian retaliatory attack on Buuhoodle and a Somaliland attack upon Widhwidh. More clashes were reported to have occurred near Widhwidh on 19 July 2010.

=== Battle of Tukaraq (2018) ===
In 2018, the Battle of Tukaraq saw Somaliland forces engage Puntland forces in Tukaraq, a town in the eastern Sool region, on the road between the regional capitals of Las Anod and Garowe. The ensuing heavy clashes resulted in Somaliland ousting the Puntland army from the town. The battle was significant as it was the first time both forces clashed directly.

=== Las Anod Conflict (2023) ===
The 2023 Las Anod conflict is an ongoing armed conflict between the Somaliland National Army and the militia forces of the Dhulbahante in Las Anod, the capital of the Sool region. Fighting erupted on February 6 after Somaliland security forces held a crackdown on civil protests. On 19 October 2023, the Federal Government in Somalia recognized Las Anod and the greater SSC-Khaatumo region as being independent of Somaliland.

== See also ==
- Somaliland Coast Guard
- Somaliland Police Force
