= Qoorlugud =

Qorilugud
- Town
- Location within Togdheer Location within Somaliland
- Coordinates: 8°33′N 46°14′E
- Country: Somaliland
- Region: Togdheer
- District: Buuhoodle

Government
  - Mayor: Mahamed Omar Farah (Jar-ku-naban)

Population (2019)
  - Total: 3,195
- Time zone: UTC+3 (EAT)

Qorilugud is a sizeable town in Togdheer region of Somaliland, located north by road from Buuhoodle. It is the second-largest town in Buuhoodle District after the district capital Buuhoodle.

== Demographics ==
In June 2006 Qorilugud had an estimated population of 3,183. The main inhabitants are the Solomadow branch of the Habr Je’lo.

== District commissioner ==
- District commissioner (Gudoomiyaha degmadda Qorilugud)
  - Maxamed Cumar Faarax (Jar-kunaban) 2015 -

In September 2014, a captain in the Somaliland army was killed by soldiers in Qorilugud military camp.

In February 2015, three people died in a dispute between Buuhoodle and Qorilugud.

In April 2015, a unit of Ethiopian armed police visited Odanleh and Qorilugud and abducted 15 residents.

In April 2015, a meeting was held in Aadan-waal to end the dispute between Buuhoodle and Qorilugud, and an agreement was reached.

In November 2015, a soldier was killed in a landmine explosion.

In October 2016, Kulmiye party opened offices in Qorilugud and Bali-alanle.

In March 2018, a settlement agreement for the clan struggle that began in 2011 was reached in Qorilugud, and construction of the suspended road resumed.

In August 2018, a meeting of the Solomadow clan was held.

In September 2018, the urban redevelopment process began.

In April 2021, two men were gunned down by an armed group while visiting to collect voting card.

In November 2021, the mayor of Buuhoodle held a groundbreaking ceremony for a new school building in Qorilugud.

== Related persons ==
- Cismaan Maxamed Cabdikariim Gacanlaw - Singer, born in Qorilugud in the early 1940s.
