= Adhi'adeye =

Town in Somalia

Ade Adeye عدي عديي
- Town
- Location in Somalia
- Coordinates: 8.6742°N 47.1569°E
- Country: Somalia
- Regional State: Khatumo
- District: Las Anod

Population (2019)
  - Total: 640
- Time zone: UTC+3 (EAT)

Adhi'adeye or Ade Adeeye (Somali: Adhi Cadeeye) is a town in the Sool region of Somalia currently under the control of Khatumo State forces. It is around 30 miles northwest of Las Anod, the regional capital of Sool.

== History ==
In October 2014, the Cilmi Naaleeye branch of the Dhulbahante clan held a clan meeting in Adhi'adeye.

In May 2016, Mustafe Maxamuud Awseed was appointed Sultan of the Fiqi-shini, a segment of the Habr Gedir, in Adhi'adeye.

In December 2020, a quarter century of clan warfare ended in Adhi'adeye.

Adhi'adeye was captured on August 25, 2023, by Khatumo State forces after successfully displacing Somaliland forces from Las Anod.

== Demographics ==
The city of Adhi'adeye is a Dhulbahante town created in the 20th century and was founded by the Naleye Ahmed, a sub-subsection of the Mohamoud Garad branch of the Dhulbahante. The city is primarily inhabited by the Reer Cilmi (Elmi Naleye) sub-clan of the Naleye Ahmed. Other Mohamoud Garad residents of the city include the Jama Siad. There is a segment of the Hawiye, called Fiqishini, who are also present in the city.

== See also ==
- Administrative divisions of Somalia
- Regions of Somalia
- Districts of Somalia
- Somalia–Somaliland border
