= Goryasan =

- ruin/vestige
- Location in Somalia
- Coordinates: 9°12′00″N 48°28′00″E
- Country: Somalia
- Region: Sool
- District: Taleh
- Time zone: UTC+3 (EAT)

Goryasan, also known as Goriasan, was the headquarters of the Dervish movement in 1910, and is contemporarily a ruin and vestige located seven kilometers to the northeast of the town of Taleh. It was the former location of the Xarun (Dervish government) in 1910 after it moved from Gaulo, which is also in the Taleh District. There are also other Darawiish heritage sites immediately to the east of Taleh such as Halin, and Dhummay which is halfway between Taleh and Halin, both of which used to have Darawiish fortifications. The year when the Darawiish xarun was settled at Goryasan was known as the Xaaraamacune (Eater of Forbidden Food) era.

== See also ==
- Administrative divisions of Somaliland
- Regions of Somaliland
- Districts of Somaliland
- Somalia–Somaliland border
