= Northeastern Somalia =

State in northern Somalia

Northeastern Somalia: Gobolka Waqooyi Bari ee Soomaaliya (Somali)
- Flag Coat of arms

- Areas claimed by SSC-Khaatumo / Northeastern Somalia
- Capital and largest city: Las Anod; 9°8′N 48°00′E
- Government: Federated state
  - President: Abdikhadir Ahmed Aw-Ali
  - Vice President: Abdirashid Yusuf Jibril
  - Speaker of the Parliament: Adan Abdullahi Aw-Hassan
- Legislature: Legislative Assembly Council
- Historical era: Modern era; Somali Civil War (2009–present)
  - Established as SSC: 2009
  - Collapsed: 2011
  - Reestablished as Khatumo State: 2012
  - Annexed into Somaliland: 2017
  - Recognized by the Federal Government of Somalia as a federal member state: April 2025
  - Renamed North Eastern State: July 2025

Area
  - Total: 24,642 km^{2} (9,514 sq mi)
- Website https://ne.so

Northeastern Somalia (Somali: Maamul-goboleedka Waqooyi Bari ee Soomaaliya), previously known as Khatumo State until July 2025 and then as North East State or Northeastern State of Somalia, is a federal member state in northern Somalia with its capital in Las Anod. It includes parts of the Sool, Sanaag and Togdheer regions (combined under the acronym "SSC"). The name Khaatumo means a positive or final decision.

It was bordered to the west by the self-declared Republic of Somaliland, which claims, but does not control, the entirety of SSC-Khaatumo. To the east, it borders Puntland, a fellow federal member, which does not recognize the existence of SSC-Khaatumo as it considers all Dhulbahante-inhabited areas to be an integral part of its territory. To the south, it borders Ethiopia's Somali Region.

Several months into the Las Anod conflict that erupted in early 2023, SSC-Khatumo forces effectively took over those regions, securing most of their claimed area and establishing a new front line about 170km from Las Anod between the villages of Oog and Guumays in western Sool.

SSC-Khaatumo was acknowledged as an interim administration by the Federal Government of Somalia on 19 October 2023, following its re-establishment on 6 February 2023, as SSC-Khaatumo after a period of mass civil unrest in Las Anod. On 30 July 2025, delegates meeting in the city of Las Anod officially announced the reconstitution of Khatumo as the North Eastern State of Somalia, "Waqooyi Bari".

== History ==
=== First iteration (SSC) ===
The territory claimed by SSC-Khatumo has long been disputed between the self-declared Republic of Somaliland and the Puntland. From the 1990s through most of the 2000s, the Dhulbahante in the area were torn between supporting Somaliland, Puntland, or the formation of an independent entity. Several clan conferences were held during this period, but none succeeded in resolving the issue. According to Markus Virgil Hoehne, the idea of establishing an administration independent from both Somaliland and Puntland already existed as early as 2003, with many Dhulbahante interviewed by him in the disputed regions advocating for it, as aid organizations were prevented from working in the area by Somaliland and Puntland. Some proposed the name of "Dervishland", alluding to the Dervish movement.

The movement for a SSC (Sool, Sanaag, and Cayn) administration emerged in 2009 within the Somali diaspora, cumulating in a conference held in Nairobi in October. Participants included Ali Khalif Galaydh, former prime minister of the Transitional Federal Government of Somalia, Mohamed Abdi Hashi, former prime minister of Puntland, and various diaspora organizations. Here, the formation of SSC as a regional government of Somalia was declared, with Suleiman Haglotosiye "Xaglo Toosiye" and Cali Xasan "Saberi" elected as president and vice-president respectively. The terms were set for two and a half years. The ultimate goal was recognition as a federal member state and the establishment of partnerships with the international community.

The idea of SSC appealed to Dhulbahante in the borderlands, as well as several prominent clan leaders, including Garad Jama Garad Ali, Garad Jama Garad Ismail Duale, and Garad Mukhtar Garad Ali, the three of whom had backgrounds in the diaspora. Its capital was Las Anod, but as the city was controlled by Somaliland, Dharkayn Geenyo acted as the transitional capital. Another center of operations was Buuhoodle. To these irredentist SSC activists, Dhulbahante lands extended beyond current realities, encompassing territory lost to other clans in conflicts and demographic changes during the 1900s, stretching from east of Burao (Isaaq/Habar Jeclo) to north of Erigavo (Habar Jeclo and Habar Yoonis). In practice, SSC exercised control only over the area between Las Anod and Buuhoodle.

From its inception, the SSC was economically weak, despite diaspora support, and had to deal with a divided Dhulbahante. Although the government sought to represent all Dhulbahante clans, the majority of manpower, weaponry, and funding came from the Farah Garad, while other clans tended to favor Puntland. SSC officials operated without salaries, there was little visible administrative infrastructure in the areas it claimed, and it lacked a formal army, relying instead on poorly organized and under-equipped militias.

On 21 May 2010, SSC forces launched an attack on Somaliland positions south of Widhwidh. Skirmishes continued until July, culminating in another clash at Kalabaydh. Xaglo Toosiye would later claim that Somaliland had initiated the conflict and that SSC was not seeking war but rather "good neighbourhood". This escalation occurred during the campaign for the 2010 Somaliland presidential election. Ahmed Mohamed Mohamoud "Silanyo", who as a Habar Jeclo claimed he better understood the challenges facing eastern Somaliland than his Gadabuursi opponent, defeated incumbent President Dahir Riyale Kahin. On 2 November, Silanyo sent a delegation to meet with Garaad Abshir Saalax, the highest-ranking traditional leader from Widhwidh, and other local leaders. The agreement they reached was quickly denounced by Saalax, who had left for Sweden, where he had a home.

On 9 November 2010, an SSC delegation met with officials of the federal government to brief them on the situation in the SSC regions and confirm the SSC's allegiance to the rest of Somalia. Xaglo Toosiye claimed he did not request financial or military assistance as "weapons do not build Somalia". While Xaglo Toosiye insisted SSC had no direct relationship with the Ethiopian government, he acknowledged that some of the SSC's leadership had met Ethiopian officials, and that SSC and Ethiopian officials met frequently in Buuhoodle.

On 9 January 2011, following deaths in the Kalshaale area from a land dispute, Somaliland declared the area a military zone and ordered all clan militias to vacate. This move was widely viewed by Dhulbahante communities as another illegal occupation of their land, allowing the SSC to coordinate armed resistance with lineages around Buuhoodle. On 30 January, SSC and Somaliland forces clashed near Hagoogane, followed by anti-Somaliland demonstrations in Las Anod the next day.

On 7 February, better equipped SSC forces clashed with Somaliland troops in the Kalshaale area. Fighting between the two sides continued into mid-February. On 21 February, Puntland President Abdirahman Farole declared he would not stand by and watch "his people" being "massacred", before backing down after meeting with Ethiopian Prime Minister Meles Zenawi. Unofficially, he tolerated some assistance to the SSC, including the movement of several dozen technicals. The SSC failed to secure territory during the fighting that year. Throughout the rest of 2011, the SSC collapsed due to internal conflict, with its leaders retreating abroad or to the countryside.

=== Second iteration (Khatumo state) ===
Flag of Khatumo State (2012–2025)

An effort to rectify the shortcomings of the earlier attempt at an independent administration was undertaken at a ten-day conference held in Taleh, known as Khatumo II, coming after Khaatumo I held in London in April 2011. On 12 January 2012, approximately 2,300 representatives of the Dhulbahante, encompassing all major sub-clans, formally declared the establishment of the "Khatumo State of Somalia", claiming the same territory previously claimed by the SSC. The new government included a rotating presidential council composed of Ahmed Elmi Osman "Karaash", Mohamed Yusuf Jama "Indhosheel", and Abdinuur Biindhe, with each leader serving a six-month term. Karaash was the first president. The outcome of the conference was broadly supported by the Dhulbahante population, both within the region and in the diaspora, but was rejected by both Somaliland and Puntland.

Two days after the declaration of Khatumo, clashes broke out between Dhulbahante militias and Somaliland forces near Buuhoodle. On 15 January, Somaliland launched an attack against Buuhoodle, temporarily occupying parts of the town. A subsequent assault on 26 January was repelled by local forces. During these confrontations, Somaliland deployed tanks and heavy artillery, leading to civilian casualties. Images of the dead and wounded circulated online, sparking pro-Khatumo demonstrations in Las Anod, Sarmaanyo, and other areas of Sool. In Las Anod, Somaliland troops opened fire on demonstrators, resulting in several deaths and the arrest of over 70 individuals. Skirmishes continued through early February in the vicinity of Buuhoodle and south of Las Anod.

Khatumo prioritized the "liberation" of Las Anod, considered the most important city for the Dhulbahante. At the time, an estimated 3,000 Somaliland troops were stationed around the city. By the end of March, Khatumo had assembled a force of 500–1,000 men and around 50 technicals, positioning themselves to the east and south of the city. On 1 April, fighting erupted between the two, with heavy weapons being used on both sides. Ultimately, the Khatumo forces were forced to retreat to areas around Taleh, Hudun, and Bo'ame. On the same day, clashes occurred near Buuhoodle.

Khatumo forces had also captured Tukaraq from Puntland troops. On 16 June, Somaliland and Puntland coordinated a counteroffensive to recapture the town. As Somaliland troops moved in, Khatumo forces withdrew, and control of Tukaraq was handed over to Puntland. In August, a delegation led by Xaglo Toosiye began negotiations with the Somaliland government. The talks led to the withdrawal of Somaliland forces from the Buuhoodle area to their prior positions around Qoorlugud, where they had been before the Kalshaale fighting in 2010, a prisoner exchange, and Xaglo Toosiye's appointment as a minister in the Somaliland government. From September to July 2014, no significant fighting occurred between Dhulbahante militias and Somaliland forces around Buuhoodle. In the town, a war memorial was created for those killed by Somaliland between January 2011 and February 2012, featuring an armoured troop carrier captured by Khatumo forces, mimicking the Hargeisa War Memorial.

With the absence of any tangible success, Khatumo was already crumbling within a year of its founding, only exacerbated by defections to Puntland. By 2015, the proto-state had practically ceased to function.

In August 2016, Khatumo commenced peace talks with Somaliland. The talks, however, caused a major disagreement between the president and vice-president of the administration, Ali Khalif Galaydh and Abdulle Agalule respectively, which eventually produced two separate administrations that both claimed to be the legitimate government. The group led by Ali Khalif reached an agreement with Somaliland, at the town of Aynabo in October 2017, which stipulated that under the condition of changing the constitution of Somaliland, the organization would become integrated within the Somaliland government.

The agreement made by Ali Khalif Galaydh and Silanyo in October 2017 could not be implemented because of the civil unrest in the Sool region. This marked the end of the Khatumo until its reestablishment in 2023 during the 2023 Las Anod conflict.

=== 2023 conflict and establishment of SSC-Khaatumo ===
Map of the Khatumo-Somaliland conflict

On 6 February 2023, the Dhulbahante clan elders declared their intent to form a state government named "SSC-Khatumo" within Somalia. On 19 March, the traditional leaders met with a delegation of MPs from Federal Government of Somalia.

After mass protests continuing from December into January 2023, the retreat of the Somaliland troops paved the way for the return of the supreme Garad of Dhulbahante, Garad Jama Garad Ali – a community leader exiled from Las Anod since 2007. Rumor spread of a grand meeting of all Dhulbahante clan elders, followed by speculation that the elders would vote to exile Somaliland security forces from the city. On 6 February 2023, the Dhulbahante clan elders declared their intent to form a state government named "SSC-Khatumo" within the Federal Government of Somalia. Fighting broke out earlier on the same day in Las Anod between Somaliland troops and Dhulbahante militias in the Sayadka Hill suburb (reportedly home to two committee members), with shots heard in the streets surrounding Hamd Hotel where Somaliland dignitaries were staying.

On 8 February, the supreme Garad of Dhulbahante, Garad Jama Garad Ali, accused the Somaliland government of genocide, called for peace and declared Las Anod's intent to be governed from Mogadishu under the Federal Government of Somalia. Within the same week of February, fighting and civilian bombardments had killed at least 82 people in total and displaced 90% of the residents. The region had produced 185,000 internally displaced people and 60,000 refugees in February. On 2 March, the mayor of Las Anod reported that Somaliland forces were bombing public buildings from the surrounding countryside including government institutions and hospitals. The UN also reported a casualty count of over 200 deaths.

On 7 June, the UN Security Council released a statement reaffirming its "full respect for the sovereignty, territorial integrity, political independence, and unity of Somalia." They also stated, "The members of the Security Council called for the immediate withdrawal of 'Somaliland' security forces and urged all parties to exercise restraint, refrain from provocative actions, incitement to violence, and inflammatory rhetoric. This is in order to de-escalate the situation on the ground, rebuild trust, and create the conditions for peace." The following day, the Somaliland Ministry of Foreign Affairs released a statement expressing their view that the UNSC "appears to be misinformed about the facts on the ground", stating that they took care to rigorously avoid civilian casualties, only firing to protect their defensive positions against the militia forces.

On 25 August, the SSC administration overran two strongholds of the Somaliland National Army in Maraaga and Goja’adde, claiming to have captured numerous towns, weapons, vehicles. On the same day, the Somaliland Ministry of Defense released a statement saying, "The National Army is in the midst of reorganization and serious preparation to confront the enemy."

Following the capture of the Goojacade army base, in Fall 2023 the frontline shifted to western Sool, emerging between the villages of Oog and Guumays. According to the Crisis Group, this division roughly corresponded to boundaries between Isaaq and Dhulbahante clans.

As of August 2024, the front line lies about 100km away from the city of Las Anod, where a military stalemate presently holds, and the carrying of weapons is strictly prohibited within the city.

=== Federal recognition and conflict with Puntland ===
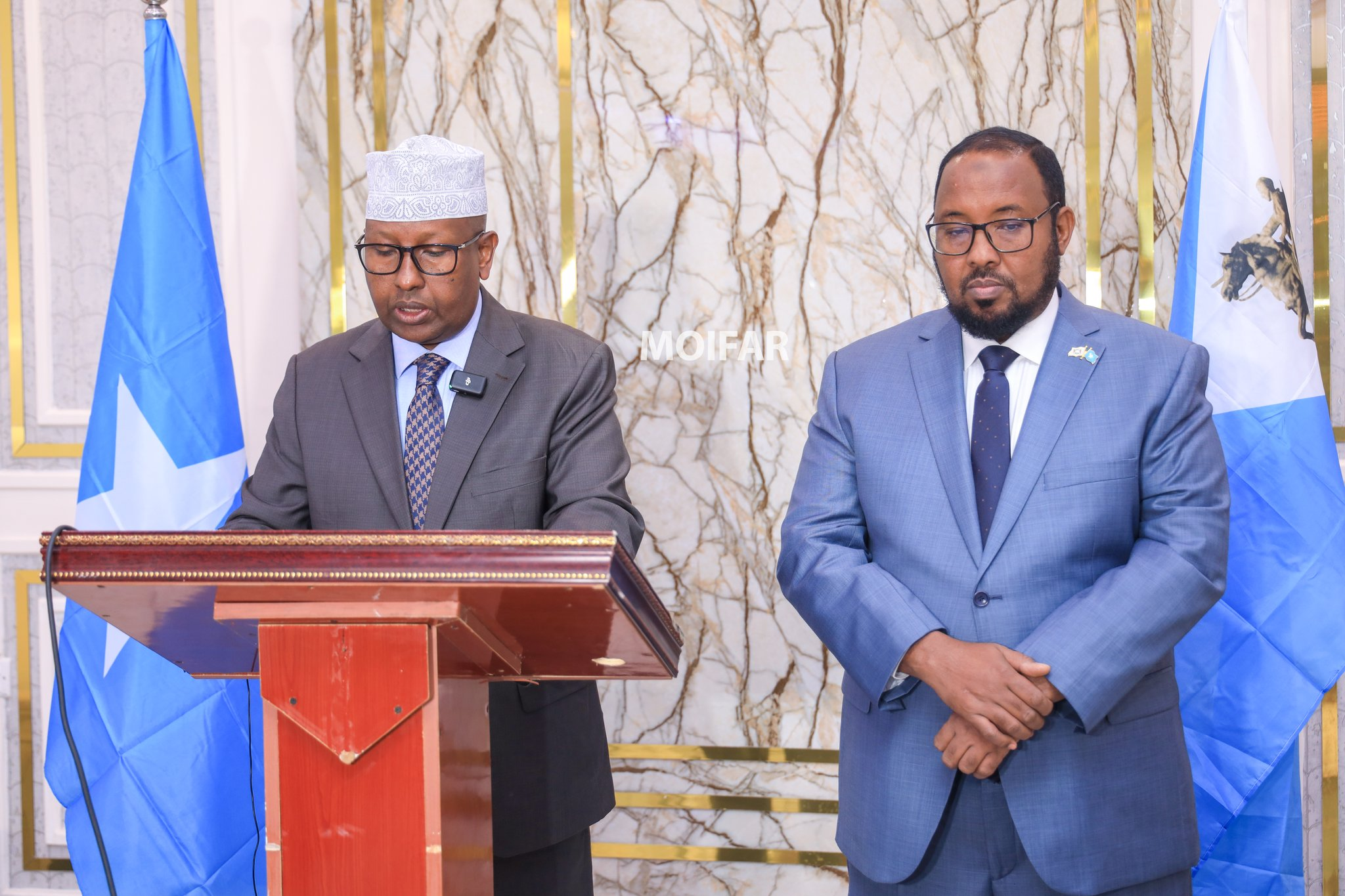
Interior Minister Fiqi (left) with Firdhiye (right)

In accordance with a joint press release, Abdulqadir Firdhiye, the President of the newly formed SSC-Khatumo interim administration, was invited, along with a delegation, to Mogadishu. During a 10-day period, extensive discussions were held on the political, security, and humanitarian situation in the disputed region.

Ultimately, on 19 October 2023, the Federal Government agreed to endorse the statement by traditional elders during their conference in Las Anod on 6 February 2023, which stated that SSC-Khatumo was not under the authorities of Puntland or Somaliland, but under the Federal Government. Additionally, the Federal Government called on Somaliland authorities and SSC-Khatumo to halt hostilities and release prisoners, expressing readiness to facilitate associated activities.

This recognition brought SSC-Khatumo in conflict with neighboring Puntland (which claims the territory of Khatumo), who condemned its establishment as unconstitutional. These tensions aided in Puntland's decision to withdrawal recognition of the Somali federal government in March 2024.

On May 24, 2025, Khatumo-associated militias seized the border village of Shahda, prompting Puntland to deploy troops before clan elders negotiated a temporary withdrawal. Puntland's Minister of Information, Mahmoud Aydiid Dirir, publicly condemned SSC-Khaatumo's actions. On July 9, elders from Sanaag and Haylaan rejected SSC-Khatumo affiliation, declaring their regions "historically and constitutionally part of Puntland" and demanding an end to federal interference. On July 15, heavy fighting broke out in Dhahar between Puntland Maritime Police Force and Khatumo militias after the PMPF occupied the town.

=== North Eastern State ===
On 30 July 2025, delegates meeting in the city of Las Anod officially announced the reconstitution of Khatumo as the North Eastern State, "Waqooyi Bari". The administration of the North Eastern State was integrated into the Somali federal system by September 2025, with the establishment of an 83 member parliament on 17 August, the election of parliament Speakers on 23 August, and the presidential election on 30 August. Abdikhadir Ahmed Aw-Ali and Abdirashid Yusuf Jibril were elected as the first President and Vice President of the North Eastern State.

== Government ==
Khaatumo's government structure comprises a legislative body and an executive body, with ongoing initiatives to establish a judicial body.

The Legislative Assembly Council of the SSC-Khaatumo administration commenced its term on 7 July 2023, with the swearing-in of 45 members. These members were selected by regional Garaads and Sultans on 6 July 2023.

The SSC-Khatumo Legislative Assembly Council assembly convened on 1 August 2023, in Las Anod to select its leadership. Jama Yasin Warsame secured the position of Speaker, garnering 25 votes out of the available 45, while Jama Adan Osman was elected as the Vice Speaker.

Abdiqadir Ahmed Aw-Ali (Firdhiye) became the President of the SSC-Khatumo Administration on 5 August 2023, receiving 30 out of 45 total votes. Mohamed Abdi Ismail (Shiine) was elected as the Deputy President.

President Abdiqadir Ahmed Aw-Ali announced the appointment of cabinet secretaries on 12 September, each nominated secretary underwent a vote of confidence from the SSC-Khaatumo 45-member committee to ensure their alignment with the administration's objectives.

The Legislative Assembly Council unanimously approved the nine cabinet secretaries appointed by the President on 26 September, officially concluding the formation and assembly of both the executive and legislative bodies of the government.

== Military ==
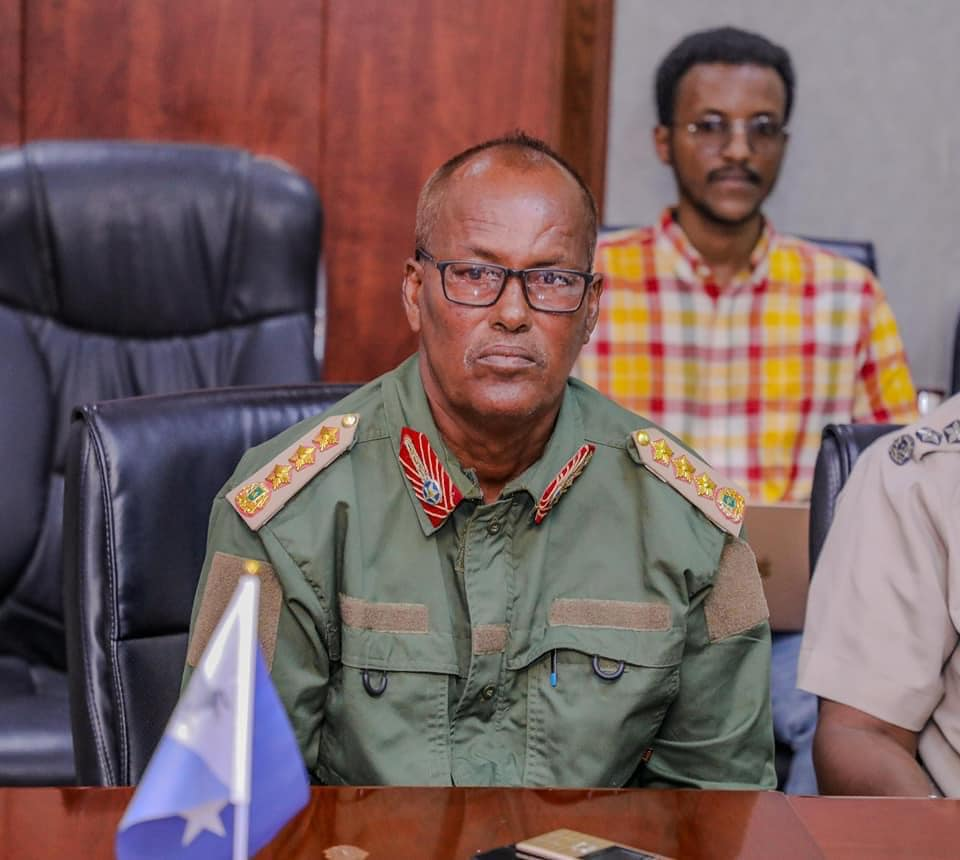
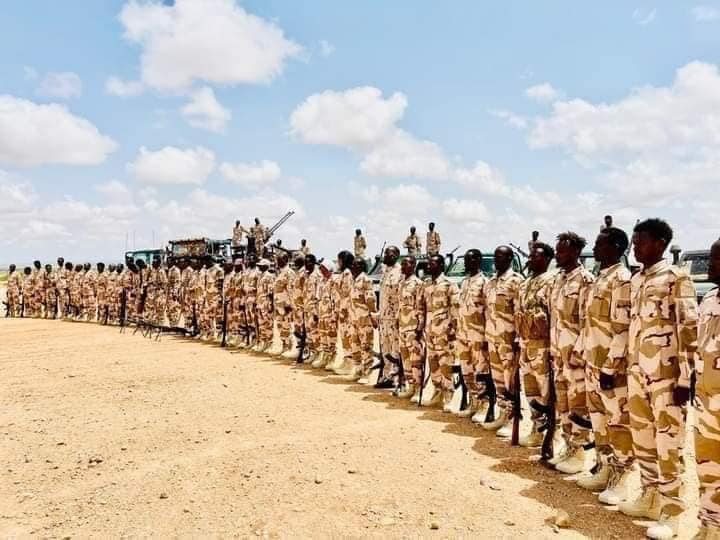
From Left – Chief of Staff, Khatumo Army

Khatumo maintains its own security forces. Exclusively financed by the state administration, they are tasked with assuring local security and defending the region's borders. According to Khatumo President Abdikhadir Ahmed Aw-Ali, the forces are well trained and armed.

Khatumo troops have been deployed in defense positions in Guumays area against Somaliland troops and SSB militia in Oog and other border towns near the frontline.

On 11 February 2024, President Firdhiye appointed General Saleban Barre Hasan to be the head of Khatumo military forces, with Mohamed Saleban Cabbi serving as the official spokesman.

== See also ==
- 2023 Las Anod conflict
- Federal Government of Somalia

== Works cited ==
- Höhne, Markus Virgil (2015). Between Somaliland and Puntland: marginalization, militarization and conflicting political visions. London: Rift Valley Institute. ISBN 978-1-907431-13-5.
