= Karin-gorfood =

- Town
- Location in Somalia Karin-gorfood (Sool)
- Coordinates: 8°07′9.61″N 47°45′24.3″E
- Country: Somalia
- Region: Sool
- District: Las Anod District

Population (2019)
  - Total: 1,200
- Time zone: UTC+3 (EAT)

Karin-gorfood (Karin-garfood, Karin-karfood) is a town in the Sool region of Somalia.

== Education ==
According to the 2007 survey, Karin-gorfood has an integrated school with 90 students. However, this year was severely affected by the drought and the resulting displacement.

== History ==
In June 2008, the International Committee of the Red Cross donated rice, oil, and cowpeas to a poor district in the Sool region including Karin-gorfood.

In September 2012, Minister of Education Puntland inspected the educational situation in Karin-gorfood and other cities.

In June 2014, Khatumo State forces led by Ali Khalif Galaydh rest their troops in Karin-gorfood on their way from Taleh to Sahdheer, pursued by Somaliland forces.

In November 2017, a measles epidemic broke out in the Bo'ame district, and the epidemic was particularly prolonged in Karin-gorfood due to a lack of vaccine and other factors.

In May 2020, a coordinator from the Somaliland Ministry of Health visited a number of towns in the Sool region, including Karin-gorfood.

In January 2021, a conference for peace was held in Karin-gorfood.
