= Northeastern State =

Northeastern State may refer to:

- Northeastern State University, public university in Tahlequah, Oklahoma, US
- North-Eastern State, former state of Nigeria
- Northeastern Somalia, federal state recognized as Northeastern State in 2025 by the Federal Government of Somalia
