= Jama Yassin Warsame =

Somali politician

Jama Yasin Warsame
- Jaamac Yaasiin Warsame

Speaker of Parliament of SSC-Khatumo (Waqooyi Bari)
- In office 1 August 2023 – 23 August 2025
- Preceded by: Position established
- Succeeded by: Adan Abdullahi Aw-Hassan

Personal details
- Born: 1989 (age 36–37) Bo'ame, Somali Democratic Republic

Jama Yassin Warsame (Somali: Jaamac yaasiin Warsame, Arabic: جامع ياسين ورسمي) is a Somali politician and Islamic scholar who has previously served as a community leader. A former university lecturer, he also played a pivotal role in conflict mediation efforts in the Sool region. He served as Speaker of the Parliament of SSC-Khatumo (Waqooyi Bari) from 1 August 2023 to 23 August 2025, when he was succeeded by Adan Abdullahi Aw-Hassan.

== Career ==
Warsame was born in the district of Boocame in the Sool region of northern Somalia. He received his primary and secondary education in Lasanod and obtained a bachelor's degree in Fiqh and Islamic Law from a university in Yemen, followed by a master's degree in public management and conflict resolution. Warsame was heavily involved in local conflict resolution, mediating disputes among local communities. He was also among the young scholars in the region who advocated for education and capacity building for youth to contribute to the wider society. Warsame served as a lecturer at Nugal University and held top management positions at various Islamic institutions, including the Al-Furqan Islamic Institute in Lasanod. Prior to his election, Warsame served as a member of the finance committee, a group working with the 33 committee members established to coordinate the local movement against the Somaliland forces' occupation in Lasanod. This committee later expanded to 45 legislative members, of which Warsame became a member. He was subsequently elected as the Speaker of the House.

On August 1, 2023, Warsame was elected as the Speaker of the Parliament of SSC-Khatumo (Waqooyi Bari). He won the position with 25 votes, while his opponent received 20 votes from a total of 45 parliamentarians. On 23 August 2025, he was succeeded by Adan Abdullahi Aw-Hassan when the Northeastern State parliament convened and elected a new speaker.

== Political involvement and leadership during the Lasanod conflict ==
Warsame was actively involved in the SSC-Khatumo committees assigned to mobilize resources and boost morale during the Lasanod conflict. He was a vocal critic of Somaliland's involvement in various atrocities committed during the eight-month-long shelling of Lasanod. Warsame worked closely with local Islamic scholars and other intellectuals to promote unity and build morale among the newly established local militia. Their efforts were instrumental in driving Somaliland forces out of the city and the entire region. This collaboration and political mobilization paved the way for the successful fall of Goojacadde when SSC-Khatumo forces overwhelmed Somaliland forces in a decisive victory.

== See also ==
- Abdikhadir Ahmed Ali
