= Las Anod Airport =

Airport in Tifafleh, Sool province

Las Anod International Airport
- IATA: none; ICAO: HCMP

Summary
- Airport type: Public
- Owner: Somali Civil Aviation Authority
- Serves: Las Anod, Somalia
- Location: Tifafleh
- Elevation AMSL: 2,077 ft (633 m)
- Coordinates: 8°34′00″N 47°20′35″E

Map
- Location of the airport in Somalia

Runways
Direction	Length		Surface
Direction	m	ft	Surface
07/25	1,800	5,906	Dirt
- Source: GCM Google Maps

Las Anod International Airport (ICAO: HCMP) is an airport serving Las Anod, the administrative centre of North East State and Sool region in Somalia. The airport is located at Tifafleh, approximately 10 km northwest of Las Anod. Its location gives it a potentially important regional role in providing air access to the wider Sool area and neighbouring parts of Sanaag and Togdheer. Las Anod is approximately 250 km by road from Burco (Burao), while the road distance to Hargeisa is approximately 478 km, placing the airport considerably closer to Burco and the eastern part of Togdheer than to Egal International Airport in Hargeisa.

The airport is particularly well positioned geographically as a regional aviation facility because Las Anod lies close to the meeting area of the Sool, Sanaag and Togdheer regions. The wider catchment around Las Anod includes communities and transport routes extending north towards Sanaag, west towards Togdheer and south and east across Sool. This makes the airport a potential air-transport hub for a broad area of northern Somalia, subject to the development of regular commercial services and airport infrastructure.

== History ==
In the mid 1900s decad, Tifafle, where the airport is situated, was an interim western waypoint that was negotiated in a three way agreement between the British and Italian colonial powers on the one hand, and the Dervish State on the other. Its waypoint lay between Hudun and Kalabaydh, Sool, the renamed new name for Baran.

In the 2010s, controversies have occurred at Las Anod airport, including over the importation of Khat, a leaf stimulant, and fighting between Dhulbahante subclans.

== Location ==
The airport is located at the outskirts of the city of Las Anod, roughly 10 kilometres (6.2 mi) in a northwesterly direction in the locality of Tifafleh.

== Regional catchment ==
Although Las Anod Airport is primarily an airport for Las Anod and the surrounding Sool region, its geographic position gives it a potential catchment extending into neighbouring regions.

=== Sool ===
Las Anod is the administrative centre of Sool and is the largest urban centre in the region. An airport immediately northwest of the city provides the most direct air connection for the Las Anod urban area and surrounding settlements. Sool extends around Las Anod towards the Nugaal Valley and the interior of northern Somalia. "Sool". Wikipedia.

=== Sanaag ===
Sool borders Sanaag to the north. Las Anod's position makes the airport potentially useful for communities in southern and western Sanaag, particularly those for whom travelling south to Las Anod may provide a shorter or more practical route than travelling farther west to Hargeisa. Sanaag also has its own airport at Erigavo, but Las Anod is substantially farther west and southwest of Erigavo and can therefore provide a complementary access point for settlements in the southern part of the region. "Sool". Wikipedia. "Erigavo Airport". GeoNames.

=== Togdheer ===
Las Anod is located relatively close to the eastern side of Togdheer. The road distance between Las Anod and Burco is approximately 251 km, while the two cities are connected by the regional road network. This places Las Anod Airport within a practical geographic relationship with eastern and southern parts of Togdheer, while Burco Airport continues to serve Burco itself. "251 Km - Distance from Las Anod to Burao". DistancesFrom. "Burao Airport". Somalia Civil Aviation Authority.

=== Regional significance ===
Taken together, the location of Las Anod Airport gives it the potential to function as a regional aviation gateway for Sool and adjacent parts of Sanaag and Togdheer. Its position is particularly relevant for communities located in the interior, where road journeys to Hargeisa and other major airports can involve substantially greater distances.

This potential regional role is reinforced by the planned development of a new airport at Las Anod. In April 2025, the Federal Government of Somalia announced the launch of construction of a new airport, describing the project as an initiative to improve regional connectivity and promote economic growth.

== Development ==
Plans to develop a new airport at Las Anod have been pursued as part of wider infrastructure development in Waqooyi Bari. In January 2025, the SSC-Khatumo administration announced the laying of the foundation stone for an airport project in Las Anod. The project was described as part of a wider community-funded infrastructure programme and was intended to modernise and improve infrastructure in the region.

On 14 April 2025, Prime Minister Hamza Abdi Barre and a federal government delegation participated in the launch of the construction of a new airport in Las Anod. The Somali National News Agency described the airport as a major infrastructure initiative intended to improve regional connectivity and support economic growth.

The proposed development could significantly expand the airport's role beyond its existing function as an airstrip. Improved runway infrastructure, passenger facilities, aircraft handling and cargo facilities would allow Las Anod to serve a wider regional market and improve connections between Sool and neighbouring areas.

In August 2026, the President of the North East State, Abdiqadir Ahmed Aw-Ali, appointed a high-level committee tasked with the construction, development and modernisation of the airport. The committee consisted of members from both branches of the administration and individuals actively involved in local development. In the same month, the state's Minister of Civil Aviation stated that the Government of China had offered to finance and construct the airport. According to the officials, the proposed Chinese involvement was expected to require a lengthy process before construction could be undertaken. The Waqooyi Bari administration consequently decided to proceed with the project through isku-tashi bulsho (community self-reliance), allowing the airport's development to proceed through locally mobilised resources rather than waiting for the proposed Chinese-funded construction programme.

The decision was presented by the administration as an effort to accelerate construction and enable the airport project to progress without waiting for the longer timeframe associated with the proposed external financing and construction arrangement. The approach forms part of the administration's wider emphasis on community participation and locally financed infrastructure development.

As of August 2026, detailed technical specifications for the planned airport, including the final runway dimensions, pavement type, terminal capacity, navigation equipment and scheduled airline network, had not been publicly established in available aviation documentation.

== See also ==
- Transport in Somalia
- List of airports in Somalia
