= Gaulo, Sool =

Gaulo
- Town
- Location of Gaulo. Gaulo (Somaliland)
- Coordinates: 8°55′42″N 48°17′54″E
- Country: Somaliland/Puntland
- Region: Sool

Population (2007)
  - Total: 1,080
- Time zone: UTC+3 (EAT)

Gaulo (Somali: Qawlo) is a town in the Sool region of Somaliland/Puntland(Somalia).

== History ==
From 1909 until 1910, Gaulo was the capital of the Darawiish. In 1920, the British Army used Gaulo as a forward base for the Taleh offensive against the Darawiish.

A book published in England in 1951 lists the coordinates 8°54′N 48°17′E as QAULO.

In 2009, World Food Programme (WFP) implemented a program to protect internally displaced persons throughout Puntland, as part of which approximately 50 metric tons of various food items were distributed to 2,052 people in Gaulo.

In November 2013, fighting broke out in Taleh and 90 percent of the residents were evacuated to nearby neighborhoods; Gaulo became one of the evacuation centers along with Halin and others.

In May 2017, Gaulo was hit by drought, but heavy spring rains brought it out of a severe situation.
