= Jidbali road =

Jidbali road is a new road which runs from Tifafleh near Las Anod Airport in the south, to Xudun towards the north. It is the main route leading from the Sool province towards Sanaag province. A precursor to the tarmac existed since the nineteenth century when it was a pathway.

== Etymology ==
Its namesake refers to a locality a few miles westwards midway through the road, which is notable for being the deadliest confrontation between the Darwiishes and the British Army. Several of the most senior Darwiish figures died at the site, including Xayd Aaden Gallaydh, three of the sons of Beynax Aaden-Gallaydh, Xirsiwaal Maxamuud Cashuur, and four of the sons of Muuse Taagane. Xudin (or Hudin) was itself briefly the headquarters of the haroun (Darawiish government) in the aftermath of Jidbali, whereupon they later fled to Halin, whilst the nearby hills of Bur Anod had previously been an outpost with small blockhouse fortifications. During the Illig Agreement, the road between Tifafleh and Xudun (Hudin) was regarded as the western border for the grazing of Darawiish livestock.

== See also ==
- Garissa
