= 2025 North Eastern State of Somalia presidential election =

Indirect presidential election in North Eastern State of Somalia

- 30 August 2025
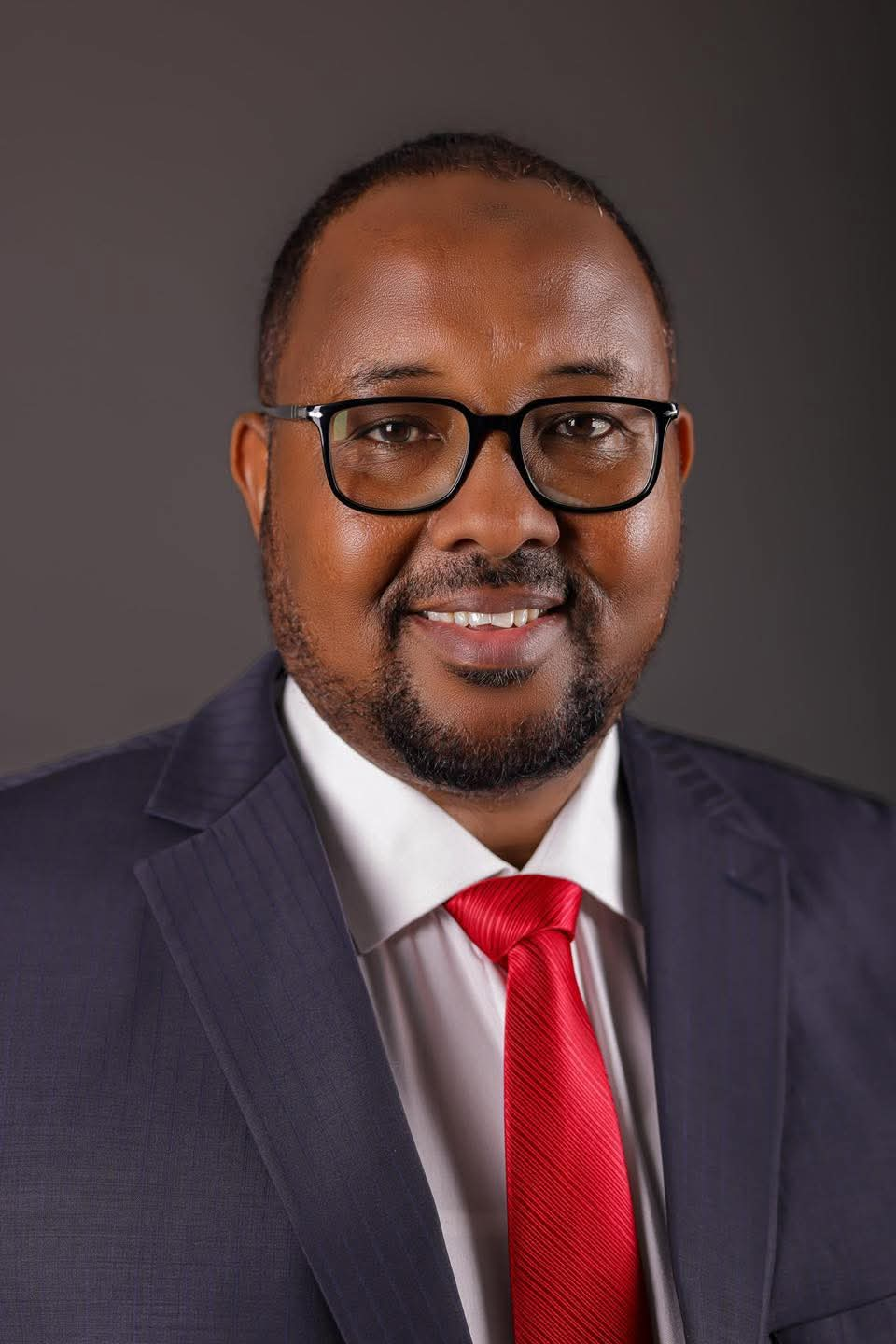
President before election
Office established
Elected President
Abdikhadir Ahmed Aw-Ali

The 2025 North Eastern State of Somalia presidential election was held on 30 August 2025 to elect the president of the North Eastern State of Somalia, also known as Waqooyi Bari. The election was conducted by the 83-member North Eastern State Assembly in Las Anod.

Abdikhadir Ahmed Aw-Ali, commonly known as Firdhiye, led the first round and advanced to the second round alongside Abdirisak Khalif. Khalif withdrew during the second round, after which Firdhiye was elected president.

== Background ==
The election followed the formation of the North Eastern State of Somalia from the former SSC-Khaatumo administration. The Somali federal government announced the formal establishment of the new state in September 2025.

On 17 August 2025, 83 members of the state assembly were sworn in for a five-year term. The assembly elected its speaker and deputy speakers before electing the president and vice president on 30 August.

== Electoral system ==
The president was elected indirectly by members of the North Eastern State Assembly. The election was held in Las Anod, the administrative capital of the North Eastern State of Somalia.

== Inauguration ==
Firdhiye was inaugurated in Las Anod in January 2026. The ceremony was attended by Somali President Hassan Sheikh Mohamud and Prime Minister Hamza Abdi Barre.

== See also ==
- North Eastern State of Somalia
- Politics of Somalia
- Federal Government of Somalia
