= Fardhidin =

- Town
- Location in Somalia
- Coordinates: 8°9′0″N 47°59′0″E
- Country: Somalia
- Region: Sool
- District: Las Anod District
- Time zone: UTC+3 (EAT)

Fardhidin (Somali: Fardhiddin) is a town in the Sool region of somalia. The town is 140 Miles away from Las Anod, the provincial capital.

== History ==
During the Somaliland campaign, the town was the site of a major battle between Dervish troops led by Mohammed Abdullah Hassan and the Somaliland Camel Corps.

In June 2013, an outbreak of acute watery diarrhea occurred in the surrounding villages of Bo'ame, including Fardhidin, infecting many small children.

In November 2017, there was an outbreak of measles that killed children in the surrounding villages of Bo'ame, including Fardhidin. Residents sought help from Bo'ame district head Xayle Xasan Shire, and Shire requested assistance from the Puntland government.

In May 2020, officials from the Somaliland Ministry of Health visited Fardhidin and other areas to deliver COVID-19 vaccine.

In August 2021, a deadly clan war broke out near Fardhidin.

== See also ==
- Administrative divisions of Somaliland
- Regions of Somaliland
- Districts of Somaliland
- Somalia–Somaliland border
