= Saleban Barre Hassan =

Somali commander; former head of the SSC-Khatumo Darawiish

- Somali: Saleebaan Barre Xasan; Arabic: سليمان بري حسن
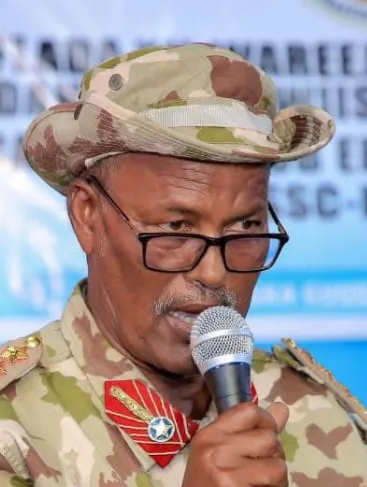

Commander of the SSC-Khatumo Darawiish forces
- In office 11 February 2024 – 28 April 2025
- Appointed by: Abdikhadir Ahmed Aw-Ali
- Preceded by: Office established
- Succeeded by: Abdifatax Mohamed Aden Abdi (interim)

Military service
- Allegiance: SSC-Khatumo (Somalia)

Saleban Barre Hassan (Somali: Saleebaan Barre Xasan; Arabic: سليمان بري حسن) is a Somali military commander who led the SSC-Khatumo Darawiish forces from 11 February 2024 until his resignation on 28 April 2025. He is widely known by the nickname Geesood. The third given-name element Hassan is sometimes rendered as Hasan in reporting.

== Prior career ==
Saleban is from the Dhulbahante’s Mohamoud Garad sub-clan, Ugaadhyahan (Gabboobe) sub-clan/sub-lineage.

On 4 January 2020, while serving as a senior commander in the Somaliland National Army, Saleban appeared at a ceremony in Karin near Daallo Mountain (north of Erigavo) where authorities announced that an initial contingent of 145 fighters from the “Caare” insurgent group had been formally integrated into Somaliland security structures; he was mentioned by name in coverage of the event.

== Defection to SSC-Khatumo ==
On 4 June 2023, Saleban defected from the Somaliland National Army and joined the SSC-Khatumo forces during the fighting around Las Anod. At that time, SSC-Khatumo was consolidating as a self-declared administration in the SSC regions while organising its Darawiish forces; front lines around Las Anod remained fluid and mediation efforts had not succeeded. Subsequent coverage described him as the former deputy chief of staff who had left the Somaliland forces and relocated to Las Anod.

== Commander of SSC-Khatumo Darawiish and resignation ==
On 11 February 2024, President Abdikhadir “Firdhiye” Aw-Ali appointed Saleban as the first overall Commander of the SSC-Khatumo Darawiish forces.

On 27 April 2024 in Las Anod, during a defense-focused consultative meeting chaired by President Firdhiye, Saleban delivered brief remarks urging continued public support for the SSC-Khatumo defense effort.

On 28 April 2025, Saleban resigned as Commander, stating that although he did not provide a formal, detailed reason, he had chosen to step away entirely from the long-held post and expressed gratitude to the President; coverage framed the move as a resignation amid reported disagreements. The same day, President Firdhiye named Abdifatax Mohamed Aden Abdi interim commander of the Darawiish.
