= Mohamed Abdi Ismail =

Somali politician (born 1980)

Mohamed Abdi Ismail Shiine
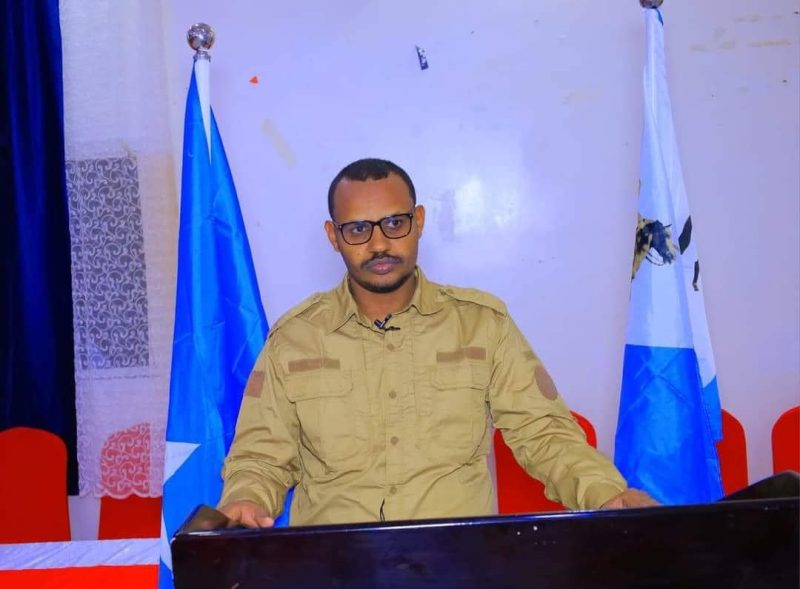
- Shiine in 2024

05 August 2023
- Leader: Vice President of Khatumo State

Mohamed Abdi Ismail Shiine (Somali: Maxamed Cabdi Ismaciil Shiine, born 1980) is a Somali politician who served as the vice president of Khatumo State of Somalia (now North East State of Somalia).

== Biography ==
Shiine was born in Buhodle in 1980. He received his primary and secondary education at Las Anod. He studied Health Science at University of Khartoum in Sudan. In addition, he holds a degree in economics and management science from Nugaal University.

He established Manhal Hospital Lascanod in 2009, he also took role in Health and Economics development in SSC KHATUMO Regions, he took part establishment of East Africa university Buhodle Branch in 2012 where he become dean of health science.

His hospital was partially destroyed and was one of heavily damaged health facility centers during the bombardment of Lascanod in the 2023 Las Anod conflict.

in August 2023 he was elected as Vice president of SSC Khatumo.
