= Bo'ame =

Bo'ame Boocame
- Town
- Location within Somalia
- Coordinates: 8°23′51.58″N 47°56′15.38″E
- Country: Somalia
- Regional State: North Eastern State
- Region: Sool
- District: Las Anod
- Time zone: UTC+3 (EAT)

Bo'ame (Somali: Boocame) is an ancient town in the eastern Sool region. It is the capital of Bo'ame district which includes the small towns of Karin-gorfood, Fardhidin, Dan-Gudban, Caleeli, Buura-wadal and Garaca Dacare and Biriqodayaga.

Until May 2022, Puntland had effective control, then Somaliland forces entered and took over the area. There was a conflict between Puntland and Somaliland in Bo'ame district in August 2022. In early January 2023, the Dhulbahante clan declared Sool and Sanaag regions, including Bo'ame, as SSC-Khatumo state, aligned with Somalia, and requested the Somaliland military to withdraw from the area.

Bo'ame serves as the district’s local market hub for surrounding agro-pastoral communities, with studies citing Bo'ame in market and value-chain assessments; the town is also referenced in national reports for agricultural programming in Sool.

== History ==
=== Before 1980s: Colonial records ===
Bo'ame is listed in the official gazetteer of place names compiled under the British Somaliland Protectorate in the late 1940s, confirming its recognition as a locality at that time.

=== 1990s: Dhulbahante clan councils vs Somaliland ===
In early 1993, the Dhulbahante clan held a reconciliation meeting in Bo'ame (Bo'ame I). Dhulbahante in Kenya participated as well. Many participants opposed the secession of Somaliland, but a 50-member delegation was sent to the 2nd National Somaliland Conference in Borama. After discussions, the Dhulbahante decided to create their own council to provide autonomy. At the end of 1996, a second meeting (Bo'ame II) was held in Bo'ame, and with diaspora support they resolved to oppose Somaliland. This was one of the foundations for the establishment of Puntland.

=== 2012–2018: Khatumo movement and Puntland ===
In January 2012, the Dhulbahante clan declared the establishment of the Khatumo State and sought to capture Las Anod and other areas, but were defeated by Somaliland forces on April 1 and retreated to Taleh, Xudun, and Bo'ame. In October 2012, the Puntland Election Commission visited Bo'ame.

In February 2013, District Director Xayle Hassan Shire said that Al-Shabaab had infiltrated Bo'ame rural areas disguised as clerics, and Puntland forces began guarding roads. In December 2013, elder Ugaas Abdullahi Isse declared that Bo'ame is part of Khatumo.

In May 2015, Puntland's Ministry of Education visited the educational situation in Bo'ame district. In November 2016, a drought affected the Bo'ame district. In January 2018, District Director Shire denied rumors of Somaliland troops arriving in Bo'ame and affirmed it was part of Puntland. In May 2018, Shire said residents were protesting against a perceived Somaliland incursion.

=== 2018–May 2022: Puntland administration ===
In October 2020, some Puntland soldiers reportedly joined Somaliland forces. In November 2020, a delegation led by Puntland’s Aviation Minister visited Bo'ame to inspect water projects. In January 2021, parliamentary voter registration took place across Somaliland, but no registration occurred in Bo'ame. On 26 February 2021, demonstrations supporting Somalia’s then-president Mohamed Abdullahi Farmaajo took place in Bo'ame. In late February 2021, Puntland’s Home Secretary announced that a local council would be established in Bo'ame district. In early August 2021, Bo'ame elders denied reports that the reconciliation agreement between Saax-maygaag and Sange-jebiye had broken down. At the end of August 2021, a deadly battle broke out in Finley village between Birta-Dheer and Bo'ame. In January 2022, Puntland Vice President Ahmed Elmi Osman visited Bo'ame and met with Saax-maygaag elders, stating he would not return to Garowe until the conflict was resolved.

=== May–Dec 2022: Somaliland incursion ===
On 18 May 2022, the Somaliland National Army reportedly captured Bo'ame. In June 2022, the Somaliland government accused Puntland of promoting war in the Bo'ame region. On 22 June 2022, Somaliland’s Minister of Information stated that Puntland troops were stationed in Galalab, Bo'ame district. On 23 June 2022, Puntland elevated Bo'ame's administrative classification from “C” to “B”. On 1 November 2022, Somaliland forces reportedly established a presence in the Bo'ame area with heavy vehicles.

=== 2023–present: Contested control between SSC-Khatumo and Puntland ===
In early January 2023, the Dhulbahante clan declared SSC-Khatumo state and requested Somaliland forces to withdraw, aligning the area with the Federal Government of Somalia. On 9 March 2023, the Somalia Health Cluster reported mobile health teams deployed to Karin-gorfood and Fardhidin in Bo'ame district during the Las Anod conflict. In August 2023, SSC-Khatumo forces captured the key Goojacade military base near Las Anod, after which multiple reports describe that Somaliland forces withdrew from frontline positions around Las Anod. According to ACLED-based reporting, Bo'ame was among Sool localities with security incidents in 2024. In September 2025, Hiiraan Online reported that Puntland deployed troops to Bo'ame District and Falariyale to block voter registration organized by SSC-Khatumo and the Federal Government of Somalia.

== Demographics ==
The town is primarily inhabited by the Dhulbahante clan, with the Hassan Ugaas and other Ugaasyo lineages well represented.

== Notable people ==
- Ilyas Osman Lugator – born in Bo'ame, he has served as Vice President of Puntland since January 2024.
- Abdinuur Biindhe – born in Bo'ame, he became President of Khatumo State in 2012.
- Jama Yassin Warsame – born in Bo'ame, he served as Speaker of the Parliament of SSC-Khatumo between 2023 and 2025.
