= Adan Abdullahi Aw-Hassan =

Speaker of the North Eastern State Parliament of Somalia

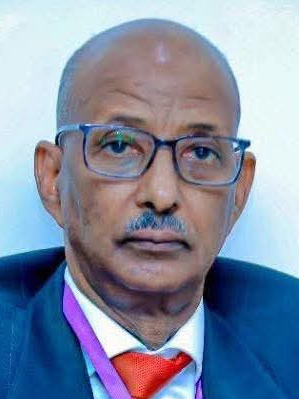

Speaker of the North Eastern State Parliament of Somalia
- Incumbent
- Assumed office 23 August 2025
- President: Abdikhadir Ahmed Aw Ali
- Preceded by: Jama Yassin Warsame

Personal details
- Born: December 31, 1954 (age 71) Las Anod, Somalia
- Education: Somali National University (B.Sc., 1982) / Utah State University (M.S.) / Oklahoma State University (Ph.D., 1992)

Adan Abdullahi Aw-Hassan (Somali: Aadan Cabdullaahi Aw-Xasan, Arabic: آدم عبد الله أو حسن) is a Somali politician, and is a former agriculture minster, currently serving as the Speaker of the Northeastern State House of Representatives since August 2025.

== Early life and education ==
The Aw in his name is an honorific borne by his grandfather Hassan. Adan hails from the Fiqishini community of the Ayr (Habar Gidir) branch of the Hawiye clan.

Adan was born in Las Anod on 31 December 1954; his parents are Abdullahi Aw-Hassan and Ardo Jama. He began his early schooling—primary, middle, and secondary—in the cities of Las Anod and Burao in Somaliland, completing secondary education at Sheikh-Bashir Secondary School in Burao in June 1977. He earned a B.Sc. in Agricultural Science from Somali National University in July 1982, an M.S. in Agricultural Economics from Utah State University in July 1988, and—after a year of service back in Somalia—a Ph.D. in Agricultural Economics from Oklahoma State University in December 1992.

== Career before speakership ==
From October 1982 to August 1989, Adan worked with Somalia’s National Agricultural Extension Service; during this period he completed his M.S. in 1988 and then returned for a year of service (1988–1989). After finishing his Ph.D. in December 1992, he joined the ICARDA, where he served for more than twenty-five years, retiring in December 2017 as Director of the Social, Economic and Policy Research Program. He later served as Minister of Livestock in the provisional SSC-Khatumo administration, and in 2023 stood as a candidate for the vice presidency of the SSC administration.

== Speakership ==
Adan was elected and sworn in as Speaker of the Northeastern State (formerly SSC-Khatumo) parliament on 23 August 2025, succeeding Jama Yassin Warsame.

== See also ==
- Politics of Somalia
- Federal Member States of Somalia
