= Halin, Sool =

Halin
- Town
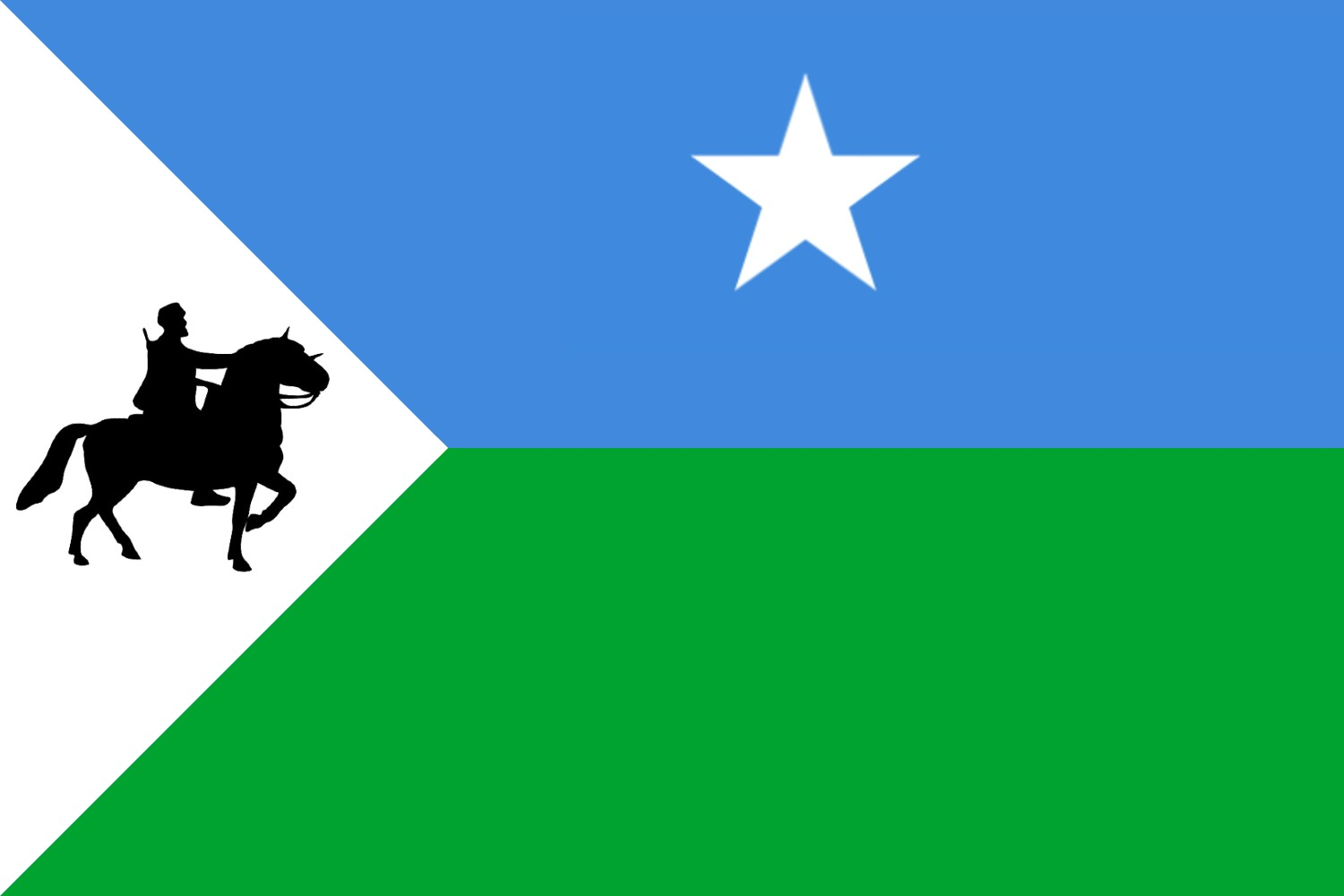
- Flag

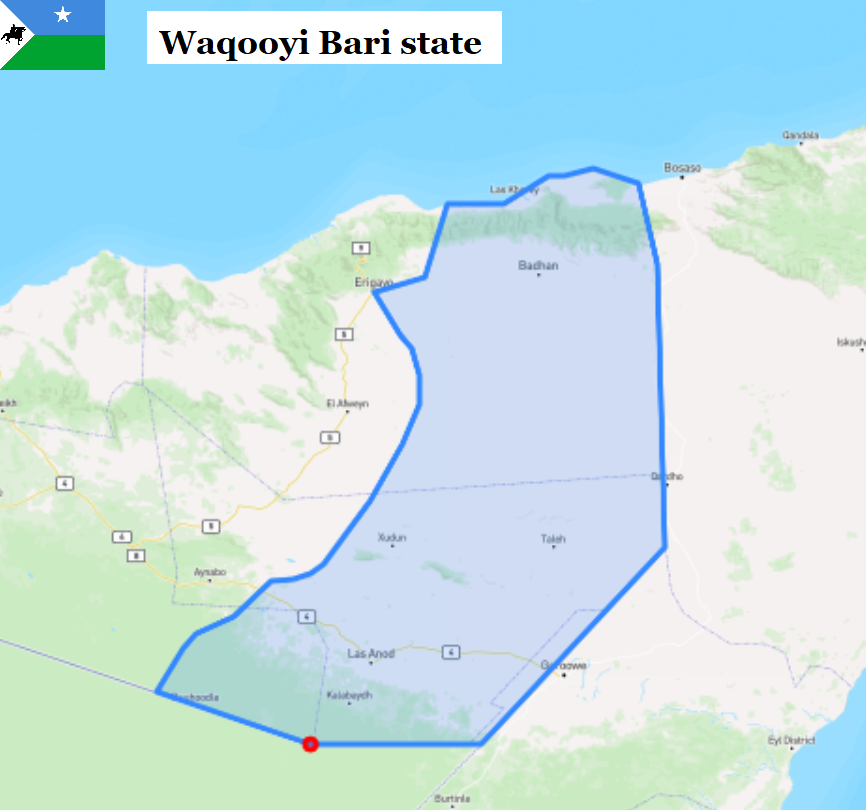

- Location in Somalia. Halin (Somalia)
- Coordinates: 9°05′10″N 48°37′14″E
- Country: Somalia
- Region: Sool
- District: Taleh

Population (2007)
  - Total: 540
- Time zone: UTC+3 (EAT)

Halin (Somali: Xalin) is a town in the Sool region of Somalia. Due to its proximity to Taleh, it functioned as one of Taleh's satellite outposts within the Taleh satellite system, thereby earmarking the Halin satellite outpost of Taleh as the only 19th century Dervish State fortification that preceded colonial belligerence, as well as a headquarters for the Dervish haroun of the Dervish State during 1903–1904.

== Government ==
Traditional councils of elders and village assemblies are responsible for administration, and village chiefs are also nominated by councils of elders and assemblies. No elections are held.

The legal system is customary law based on Sharia.

== Demographics ==
The town is inhabited by the Dhulbahante clan of the Harti sub-division of Darod. It is primarily settled by the Nur Ahmed sub-lineage of the Ugadhyahan Siyad-Mohamoud Garad sub-division of the Dhulbahante.

== Environment ==
Unusually for the Sool region, Halin has a year-round river.

Annual precipitation is around 100 to 200 millimeters and is subject to frequent droughts.

A legume called Garanwaa, Prosopis juliflora, is under threat as an invasive species.

== Economic ==
In the past, date palm, sugarcane, and other crops were cultivated and cattle were raised, but the legume Garanwaa, an invasive species, has become a weed, and both crops and pastures have suffered greatly.

Mainly shipped to Qardho, Garowe and other cities in Puntland, as well as to Somaliland and central Somalia.

According to 2019 reports, tomatoes, onions, peppers, lettuce, and cabbage are grown. Residents responding to the report had a monthly income of $160.

== Education ==
The village has a primary and intermediate school, where about 40 percent of the students are women. It is funded by the diaspora. There is no secondary school in the village, and most families complete their education in intermediate school because they do not have the money to send their children to secondary school in the city.

== Medical ==
There are no medical facilities in the village, the closest being the hospital in Las Anod. Pregnant women in particular are often at risk.

== History ==
Harin is an old settlement and was one of the strongholds of Mohammed Abdullah Hassan when he revolted against the British in the early 20th century.

From 1963 until the beginning of the Somali Civil War (c. 1990), there was a date palm agricultural cooperative and the administrative structure was more developed than in surrounding pastoral villages. 800-100 kg of sugar was produced annually in the 1980s.

In December 2013, residents of Halin were evacuated to avoid fighting between the Khatumo State and Somaliland.

The drought that occurred from 2015 to 2017 caused significant damage.

In August 2017, Somaliland election officials were injured during a visit to the Halin district.

In May 2019, heavy rains caused extensive damage to the Harin district.
