= Abdinuur Biindhe =

President of Khatumo State in 2012

Abdinuur Cilmi Qaaji
- Somali
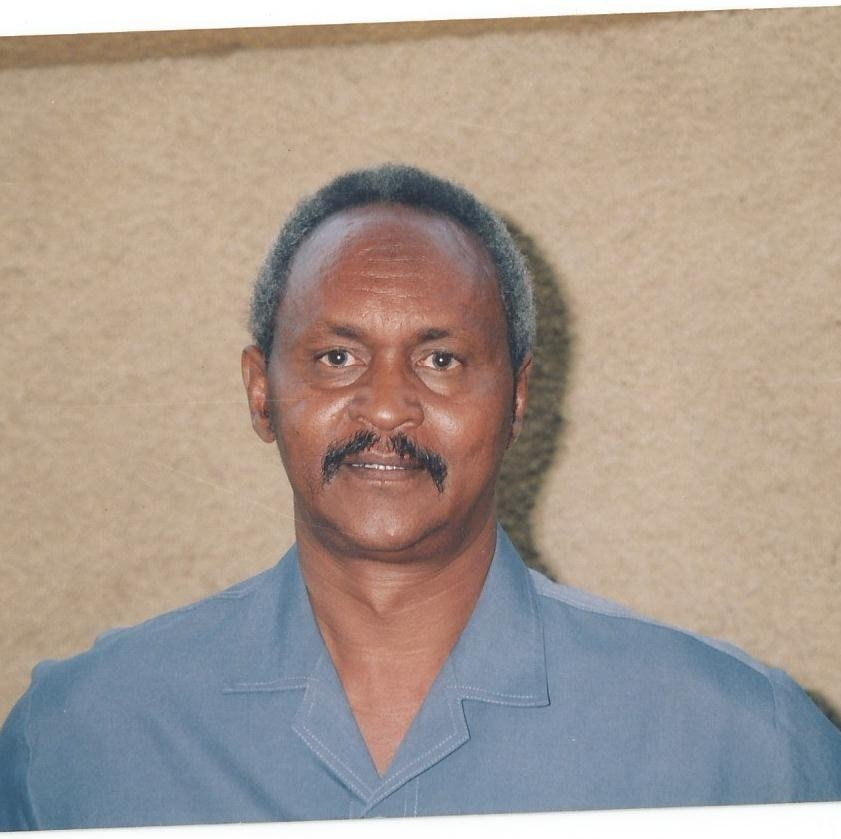

President of Khatumo
- In office 2012–2012

Personal details
- Born: September 15, 1952 Bo'ame, Sool, British Somaliland
- Died: January 26, 2018 (aged 65) Mogadishu
- Spouse: Fadumo Bile Noor
- Children: Mohamed, Mustafa, Bashir, Haroun, Omar, Amirah, Elmi "Majed", Ahmed

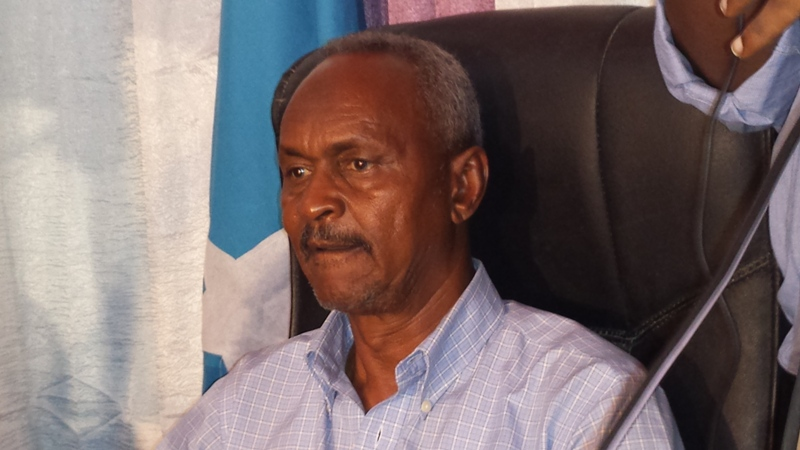
Biindhe

Abdinuur Cilmi Qaaji, commonly known as Biindhe, was the president of Khatumo State in Northern Somalia in 2012.

== Flag ==
It was during Biindhe's reign as Khatumo president that the flag for Khatumo was designed. Rooda Xassan, the flag's designer, said the cavalryman on its design features an anonymous Darawiish; the cavalry during the Dervish era being referred to as Dooxato:

Calanka Khaatumo wuxuu muujinayaa darwiish gaadh ka haya qaran-nimada iyo midnimada ummadda Soomaaliyeed

Translation:

the flag of Khatumo features a Darwiish person who stands for the nationalism and cohesion of the Somali nation

== See also ==
- Politics of Somalia
