= Taleh District =

Taleh District (Somali: Degmada Taleex) is a district in the eastern Sool region of Somaliland. Its capital lies at Taleh, the former headquarters of the Dervish State centered in the city of Taleh.

== Education ==
There are 6 schools operating in Taleh serving 600 students.

== See also ==
- Administrative divisions of Somalia
- Regions of Somaliland
- Districts of Somaliland
