= Abdikhadir Ahmed Aw-Ali =

Somali politician (born 1972

Abdikhadir Ahmed Aw-Ali Firdhiye
- Cabdiqaadir Axmed Aw-Cali
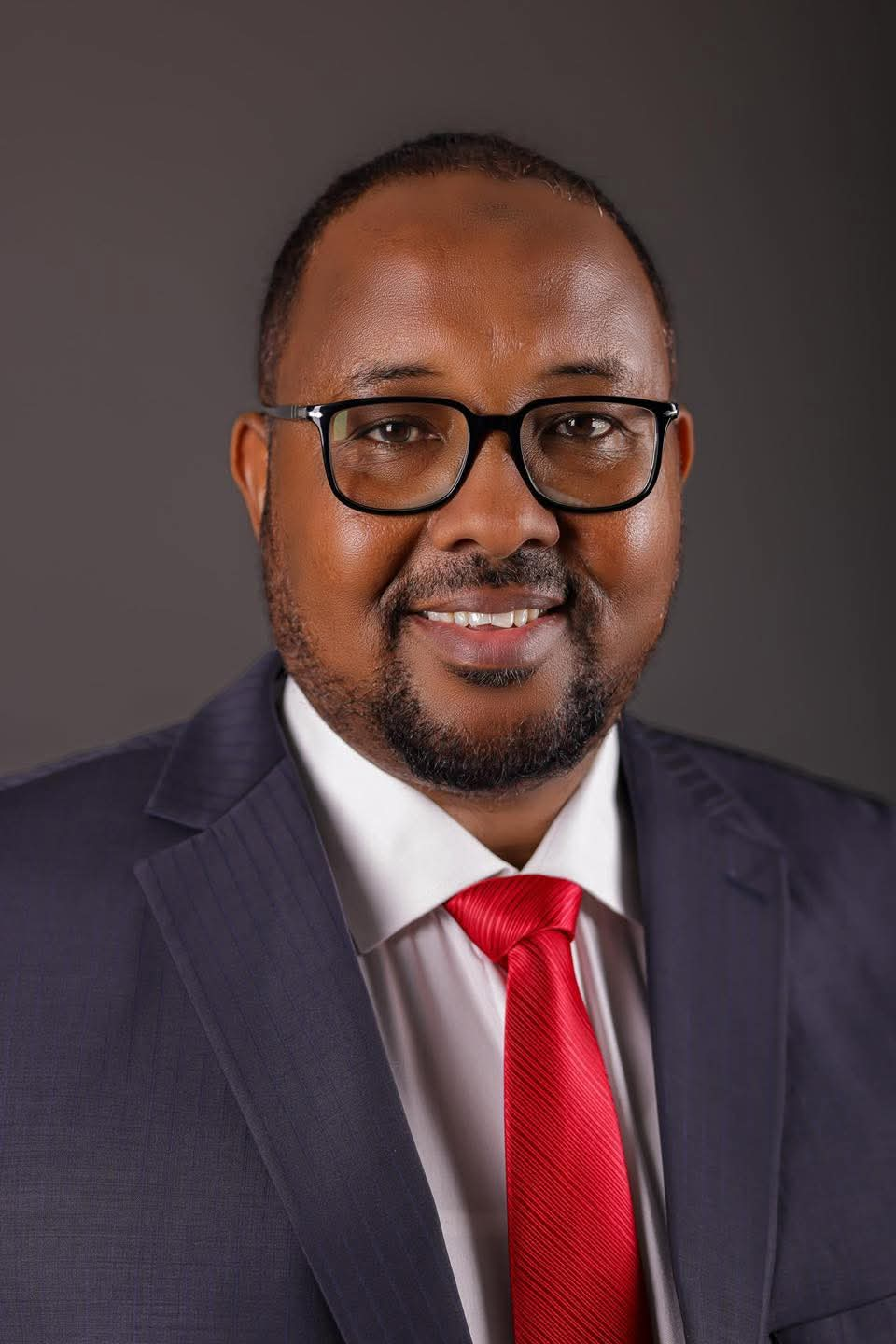

President of North East State of Somalia
- Incumbent
- Assumed office 30 August 2025

Personal details
- Born: 1972 (age 53–54) Taleh, Somali Democratic Republic
- Nickname: Firdhiye

Abdikhadir Ahmed Aw-Ali (Somali: Cabdiqaadir Axmed Aw-Cali, born 1972), nicknamed Firdhiye, is a Somali politician who serves as the current president of North-East State of Somalia.

== Biography ==
Firdhiye was born in Taleh in 1972. He received his primary and secondary education at Las Anod. He studied Islamic Studies at Umma University in Kenya. In addition, he holds a degree in Business Administration from the University of Nairobi.

He lived in Nairobi as assistant manager of Amal company in Nairobi. Since 2009, he has had the idea to make Khatumo independent, which affected his work and he was temporarily laid off from the company, but was reinstated shortly after.

=== Governor representing SSC Khaatumo of Somalia ===
On August 5, 2023, he became the President of the SSC-Khatumo with 30 votes out of 45 on the Central Council. He was 51 years old at the time.

On August 25, he visited a hospital in Yagori and delivered a speech. At the speech, he reported that SSC-Khatumo had taken over the Somaliland Force's Gooja-Adde base east of Las Anod. On August 26, he mentioned the exchange of prisoners of war with Somaliland. On August 27, Firdhiye asked the Somaliland government not to attack Las Anod.

On August 29, Firdhiye visited Guumays, welcomed Vice President of Puntland.

On September 15, Firdhiye demanded that the Federal Government of Somalia recognize that SSC-Khatumo belongs to Somalia.

On 6 October 2023, an SSC delegation led by Firdhiye was invited by Somalia Prime Minister Hamza Abdi Barre to visit the Somalia capital Mogadishu. In response, Faysal Ali Warabe, Chairperson of the Somaliland Opposition Party UCID, said, "Firdhiye does not represent Las Anod and the town will eventually be returned to Somaliland." In December 2023, Fidhiye criticized the UK for undermining the autonomy of the SSC (Sool, Sanaag, Cayn) regions.

On May 18, 2024 Firdhiye met with Silvia Fernández de Gurmendi, former president president of the International Criminal Court, on the sidelines of a high level conference on Peace and justice in Italy.

== Writing ==
On 19 February 2025, Abdikhadir Ahmed Aw-Ali published an Op-Ed on Wardheer News titled: A One-Clan Enclave in Somalia Cannot Be A Nation: The Case Against Somaliland’s Recognition.
