= Taleh =

Taleh تليح
- Town
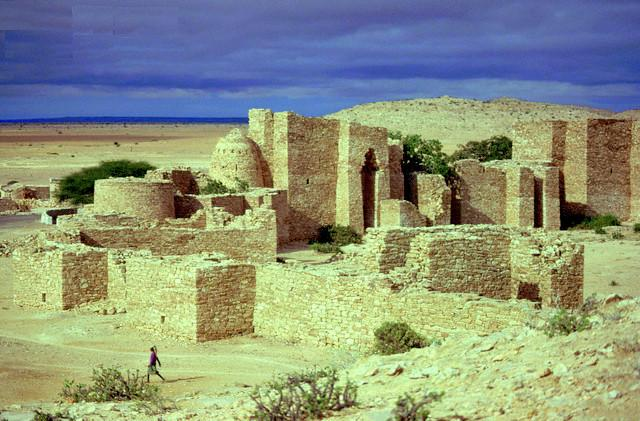
- Historical site in Taleh

- Location in Somalia
- Coordinates: 9°8′51″N 48°25′15″E
- Country: Somalia
- Regional State: North Eastern State of Somalia
- Region: Sool
- District: Taleh

Population (2007)
  - Total: 43,740
- Time zone: UTC+3 (EAT)

Taleh (Somali: Taleex, Arabic: تليح) is a historical town in North East State of Somalia (Waqooyi Bari) in eastern Sool province. The town served as the capital of the pre-independence Dervish.

The Dalyare fort and the Taleh complex built between 1909 and 1910 are among the least disfigured Dervish era structures that remain in Sool province, whom altogether comprise 27 Dervish era structures.

Taleh's satellite fort in adjacent Halin was first and the only 19th century Dervish fortress, although it was destroyed in 1902 in the second expedition. As such Taleh and the Taleh satellite complex was ultimately the administrative heartland of the Dervish State, hosting the grand fortress complex of Silsilad as well as the it's earliest recorded fortification at adjacent Halin. According to the concurrent London Gazette, Taleh and Jidali were the two main Dhulbahante garesas inhabited by the Dervish at the conclusion of hostilities.

== History ==
=== Dervish State ===
==== Dhulbahante garesa ====
In the Dervish-written letter's description of the fall of Taleh in February 1920, in an April 1920 letter transcribed from the original Arabic script into Italian by the incumbent Governatori della Somaliland, the various Dervish-built installations are described as garesas taken from the Dhulbahante clan by the British:

i Dulbohanta nella maggior parte si sono arresi agli inglesi e han loro consegnato ventisette garese (case) ricolme di fucili, munizioni e danaro.

Translation:

the Dhulbahante surrendered for the most part to the British and handed twenty-seven garesas (houses) full of guns, ammunition and money over to them.

The Mogadishu governor was later inspired to similarly refer to his resident mansion as a garesa.

==== Choice as capital ====
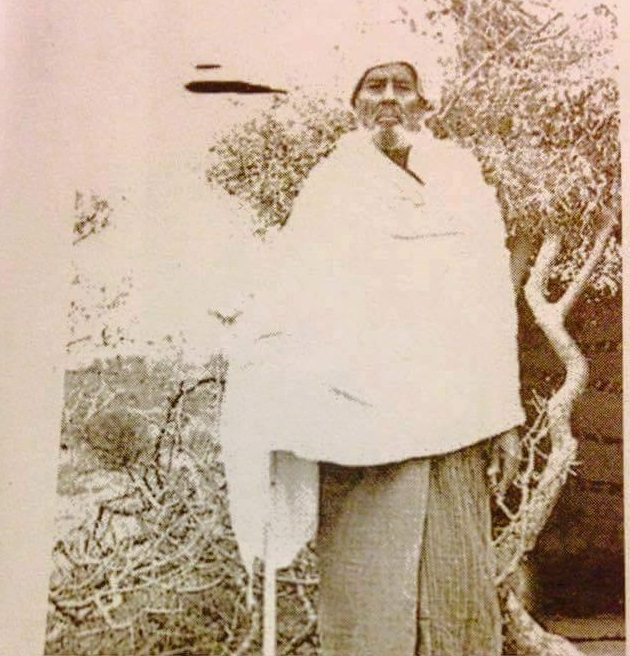
The last residents of the Silsilad fort were Haji Yusuf Barre, the singlehanded defender of Taleh, Mohamud Hosh (pictured), the last castellan of Taleh and Jama Biixi Kidin, an abandoned Dervish child prisoner.

According to Dervish veteran Ciise Faarax Fikad, Taleh was chosen as the Dervish capital because the Nugaal Valley lies at the heartland of Dhulbahante territory, its distance from colonial administrative centers and to generate geographical distance from the hostile bodies such as Rayid signatories to British treaties, the Majeerteen, those under Mohamoud Ali Shire and the Ogaden who were in general opposed to the Dervish:

Iyadoo nimankii dalka waagii hore degi jirey ( Dhulbahante ) ay Sayidka ku dirqiyeen in Nugaal la dego ... Ingiriis iyo dadka raacsan iyo Daraawiish waxa ka dhexeeya colaad guun ah oo aan damihayn ... Maxamuud Cali Shire waynu dagaallannay ... Boqor Cismaan iyo raggiisii Talyaani baa dab ku afuufay oo iyaguna horeynu u collownay ... Cali Yuusuf ... Ogaadeen in yar mooyee Xabashi baa dabada ka wadda oo dagaalkii Gurdumi bay inooku dudayaan iyana waa inoo col.

Translation:

The native inhabitants of the Nugaal Valley, i.e. the Dhulbahante are those whom insisted it be made the Darawiish capital ... There was enmity and antagonism between Darawiish and the Somali signatories of British treaties ... we've fought Mahamoud Ali Shire ... The Majeerteen kings Cismaan and Ali Yusuf have been armed by the Italians in order to harm Darawiish and we've clashed before ... the vast majority of Ogaden are allied with the Abbysinians and the Ogaden showed their true colors during the Gurdumi incident when they became overt foes.

Colonial sources concur with Somali sources that non-Dhulbahante clans were hostile towards the Dervish:

The coast tribes, viz ., the Habr Toljaala, the Habr Gerhajis, the Warsangli of our own Protectorate, and the Mijjarten tribes of the Italian Protectorate were all professedly hostile to the Mullah.

— Charles Egerton (Indian Army officer)

===== Dervish forts/Dhulbahante garesas =====
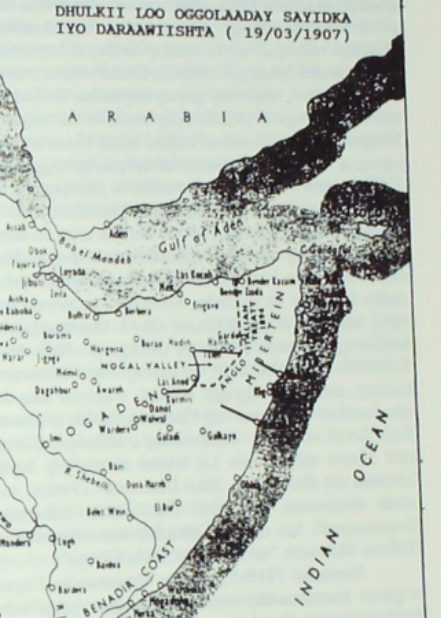
Territory of Dervish sultan Diiriye Guure in 1907 (marked out in black ink delineation), according to Somali historian Muxamed Ibraahim Muxamed, consisted of the Ciid-Nugaal regions of Nugaal province, Las Anod District, Xudun District, Taleh District, Boocame District and Bookh District.

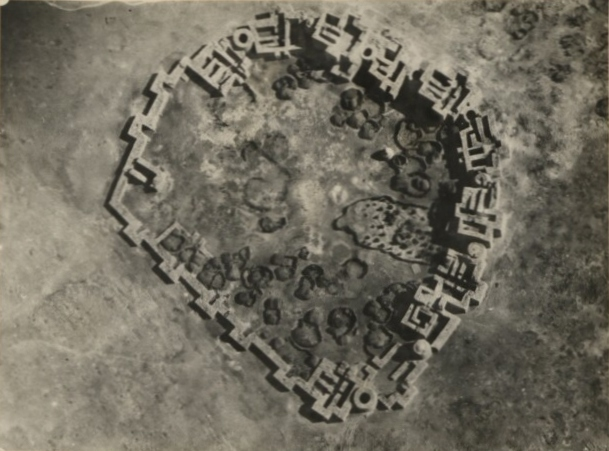
Aerial photograph of the largest Dhulbahante fort in Taleh

Taleh is home to several historic structures dating to the Dervish era. Of these, there are five forts erected by Mohammed Abdullah Hassan's former Dervish movement in present-day Sool and Sanaag. Constructed between 1901 and 1915, most of the edifices are concentrated in the Sanaag & Sool region, including Dalyare fort, Jidali fort, Midhisho, Shimbir Bariis and Badhan. Taleh/Taleex is the largest of the structures. According to Cabdi-Yaar Cali Guuleed, a Dervish veteran, the largest Dhulbahante fort from the Dervish era is the Dhulbahante fort of Taleh which according to him was built between 1909 and 1910 and he said the following:

Waa xaruntii Daraawiisheed, waxayna ku taal bartamaha Nugaaleed, dhinaca waqooyi. Waxaa la dhisay 1909-1910.

Translation:

It was the headquarters of the Darawiish, and it is situated in the center of the Nugaal Valley, in a northern direction. It was built between 1909 to 1910

It was built around a collection of Dervish tombs, the earliest of which belongs to Sultan Nur Ahmed Aman and Carro Seed Magan, the mother of the emir of Diiriye Guure, i.e. the Sayid. From 1909 to 1910, the Dervish constructed the main fort around the older tombs. They spent the next two years in the mountainous regions of Sanaag building three more smaller forts.

Maxamuud Xoosh Cigaal was the last Dervish man to be resident at the Taleh fort, whilst the six-year old Jaamac Biixi Kidin was the last Dervish person in the fort overall.

A 1931 diary-book by former governor of Italian Somaliland Francesco Caroselli notes an April 1920 letter by the Sayid to the then Italian-Somalia governor which states the Taleh fort was one of 27 forts built by Dervish and that they're called Dhulbahante garesas.

Gl’Inglesi che sapevano questo ci son piombati addosso con tutta la gente e con sei volatili (aeroplani). Per tal fatto ci siamo sabandati e non c’e’ stato piu’ accordo fra di noi: i Dulbohanta nella maggior parte si sono arresi agli inglesi c han loro consegnato ventisette garese (case) ricolme di fucili, munizioni e danaro ... E ora diciamo ... desideriamo tu faccia qualcosa per noi nel senso di intervenire fra noi e gli inglesi per restituirci le nostre famiglie, figili, beni, terrtori. E cosi c’impegnamo sopra la nostra anima di stare in pace, tranquilli e di non disturbare mai piu’ le altre genti ee prenderemo la te la bandiera ... Saluti

Translation:

The English knew about our situation and yet pounced upon us with all their men and with six birds (airplanes). Because of this, we scattered and dispersed as there was no longer an agreement between us: most of the Dhulbahante tribe surrendered to the English who confiscated from them twenty-seven garesas (houses) full of rifles, ammunition and money... As such... we want you to become mediators between ourselves and the English, as we aspire that they restore to us our families, children, wealth, and territory; in this way we may enter into equitable cooperation of peace and tranquility, such that we remain quiescent, and that we take your flag. Greetings.

==== Fall of Taleh ====
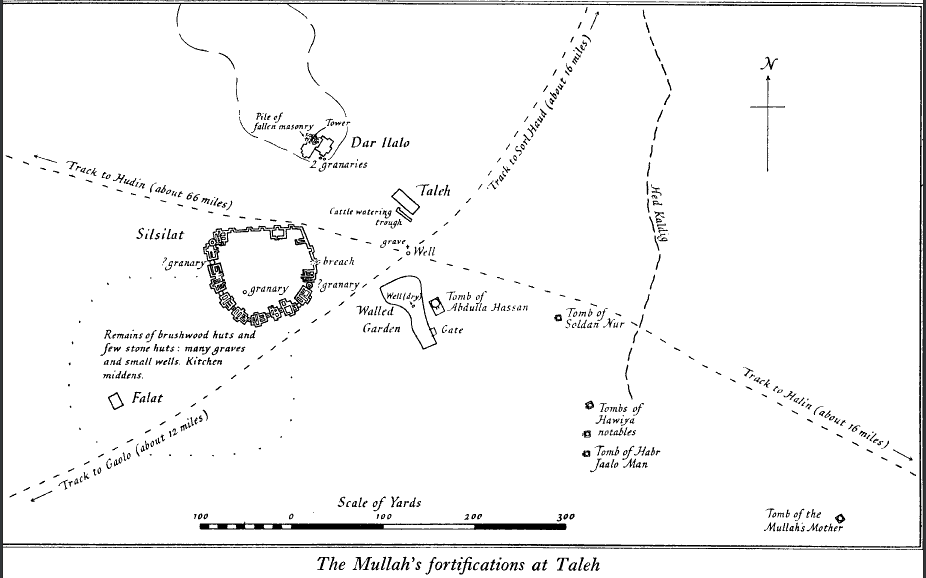
'The Mullah's fortifications at Taleh'. The tombs of Mohammed Abdullah Hassan[ empty ], Sultan Nur and Haji Osman Abdallah head of Kob Fardod Rashiidiya-Ahmediya tariqa and brother in-law of Sheikh Abdullahi Hassan senior . The 2 Hawiye Mullaha's unnamed along Haji Osman were the head mullahs and founders of Kob Fardod late 1860s.

In 1919–1920, the British Royal Air Force (RAF) bombarded the Sanaag forts, where most of the Dervish had operated since 1913. Having destroyed the structures and driven out Mohammed Abdullah Hassan's men to Taleh in 1920, they finally attacked the town, assisted by horsemen and Somali personalities. The settlement was bombarded by the Royal Air Force on 4 February and taken days later, with the British having defeated the last pockets of Dervish resistance. Among the casualties at Taleh were commander ismail mire and Artan Boos, two of the closest men to the Mullah and both being of the Dhulbaahante sub-division of the Harti. The former was the commander of the Dervish at Taleh, and the latter was a long-standing member of the movement according to Douglas Jardin (1923) and Henry Rayne (1921). Another Dervish leader, Muuse dheere, was captured alive and later executed by former Dervish Abdi Dhere, who had defected to the opposition in 1919. Muhammad Abdullah Hassan himself managed to escape to the Ogaden, where his Dervishes were later routed in a 1921 raid led by the clan leader Khadar Taagane.

=== After the Somali civil war ===
At the beginning of the Somali civil war, the Sool region was in a drought, and the area around Taleh was particularly affected. Local nomads lost much of their assets and migrated to nearby cities such as Las Anod.

In 2009, women reportedly have no voting or suffrage rights in Taleh at this time.

In March 2011, elders of Taleh resolved to call for the withdrawal of Somaliland troops from Sool. On December 26, 2011, an SSC meeting was held in Taleh, attended by elder Haji Abdikarim Hussein and others.

In August 2011, fighting between Somaliland and Puntland forces occurred in Taleh, with at least 3 killed and 7 wounded.

In January 2012, Somaliland police arrested a reporter from Universal TV in Las Anod who broadcast news about the Taleh clan meeting for allegedly distorting the content of the meeting.

=== Conflict between Somaliland and Khatumo ===
In January 2012, the Dhulbahante clan proclaimed the independence of Khatumo State with Taleh as its capital. However, this was not recognized internationally, nor by neighboring states Somaliland and Puntland.

In November 2012, Somaliland municipal elections were held, but voting did not take place in Taleh for security reasons.

In November 2013, there were clashes between Puntland and Khatumo forces, which also killed several civilians. Many of Taleh's residents were evacuated to nearby neighborhoods. Epidemics of diarrhea, pneumonia, and other diseases occurred in evacuated areas.

In mid-April 2014, Somaliland sent hundreds of troops to occupy Taleh, the main town in Khatumo. The Special Representative of the UN Secretary-General for Somali Affairs, Nicholas Kay, expressed concern about the conflict between Somaliland and Puntland and urged mediation by the United Nations Assistance Mission in Somalia (UNSOM). Somaliland troops withdrew one day after occupation.

In June 2014, Somaliland also temporarily occupied Taleh.

In April 2015, five people were injured in a confrontation between the Samakab Ali and Farah Ali clans in Taleh.

In December 2015, the Somaliland government granted a foreign company a permit to conduct oil exploration in the Sool region, and when that company conducted oil exploration in Taleh and Hudun, Puntland condemned this as a provocation by Somaliland.

In May 2016, Puntland's Minister of Insurance visited Taleh to lay the cornerstone for the birth center.

In December 2016, the region was in drought and a delegation, including Somaliland's Interior Minister, has visited several towns in the Sool region, including Taleh, to survey the drought situation.

In 2017, the Puntland President Abdiweli Gaas appointed Mohamed Roble Isse as Taleh District Commissioner.

The 2017 Somaliland presidential election saw Taleh become a constituency for the first time.

In June 2018, a SOMNEWS TV reporter was arrested by Somaliland police for reporting on a press conference held by elders in the Taleh district.

In April 2019, Somaliland forces and pro-Somaliland militias took control of the Taleh district. Khatumo forces withdrew without fighting.

In April 2019, diarrhea symptoms caused by water shortage occurred in Taleh. Taleh has no hospital and is coping with traditional home remedies, with some patients being taken to Las Anod, which is dominated by Somaliland, and others to Garoowe, the capital of Puntland.

In December 2019, Somaliland's Minister of Information visited Taleh.

=== SSC-Khatumo and Waqooyi-Bari emergence ===
In January 2023, the Khaatumo government begins voter registration for municipal elections and parliamentary election in Sool region, including Taleh. One polling station was set up in the Taleh area, and the distribution of ballots was scheduled for three days until March 15, but a one-week postponement was announced. In June, preliminary results from the regional parliaments were announced and Jamaahirta 6, Qalas 3, Maqawir 0 are selected in Taleh.

On 20 July 2025, it was announced that SSC-Khatumo would morph into Waqooyi Bari, a federal state that was officially acknowledged by the Somal Federal Government, and that would merge the preexisting SSC-Khatumo and Maakhir regions into a unified federal member state.

== Silsilad ==
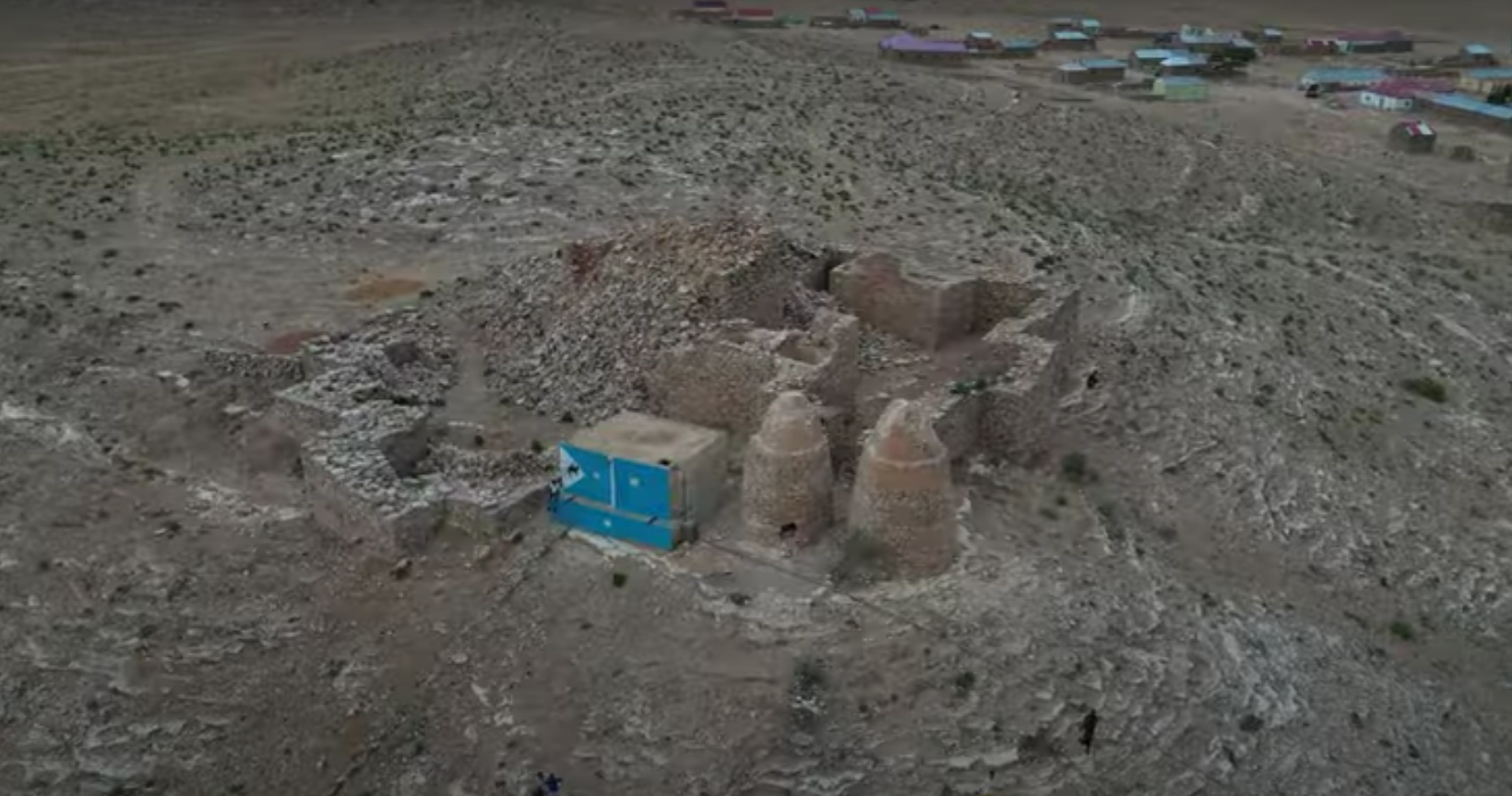
SSC-Khatumo flag adorned on the Silsilad fort

=== Conception ===
The notion of the building of fortresses for Dervish inhabitation pre-existed the expeditions as Eric Swayne encountered a fort at Halin during the second expedition in 1902, as such, arguably timeframing the building of Taleh's satellite fort of Halin to the 19th century. The British War Office stated that Eric Swayne destroyed the fort in 1902, and that it was inhabited by the Ugaadhyahan Dhulbahante subclans of Naleye Ahmed and Nur Ahmed:

a detached force proceeded the same night to Biyu Gudud and attacked the Naliya Ahmed and Nur Ahmed, the pursuit being carried into the plain of the Northern Hand as far as Kol Dorran. Some guns and ammunition were captured and the tribes fled northward towards some wells about 60 miles from the sea. The whole force then returned to Biyu Gudud on 1 August, and the dervish fort at Halin (9 miles (14 km) north-northease of Lower Halin) was destroyed.

According to the British War Office, the Dervish temporarily formed a government-in-exile; the condition of the Dervish State at Eyl / Illig was one of them seeking sanctuary as refugees, viewing Italian protectorate territory as a "safe line of retreat" and as a place of "refuge in their midst":

The Mullah, with practically only his Ali Gheri kinsmen, is a discredited refugee in the Mijjarten territory, at the mercy of Osman Mahmud. His actual capture by the field force is, under present conditions, in my opinion impracticable ... the operations already ordered for the capture of lllig and dealing a last blow at the Mullah are to be carried out

Taleh's satellite fort in adjacent Halin was first and the only 19th century Dervish fortress, although it was destrowyed in 1902 in the second expedition. As such Taleh and the Taleh satellite complex was ultimately the administrative heartland of the Dervish State, hosting the grand fortress complex of Silsilad as well as the it's earliest recorded fortification at adjacent Halin. According to the concurrent London Gazette, Taleh and Jidali were the two main Dhulbahante garesas inhabited by the Dervish at the conclusion of hostilities.

=== Human habitation ===
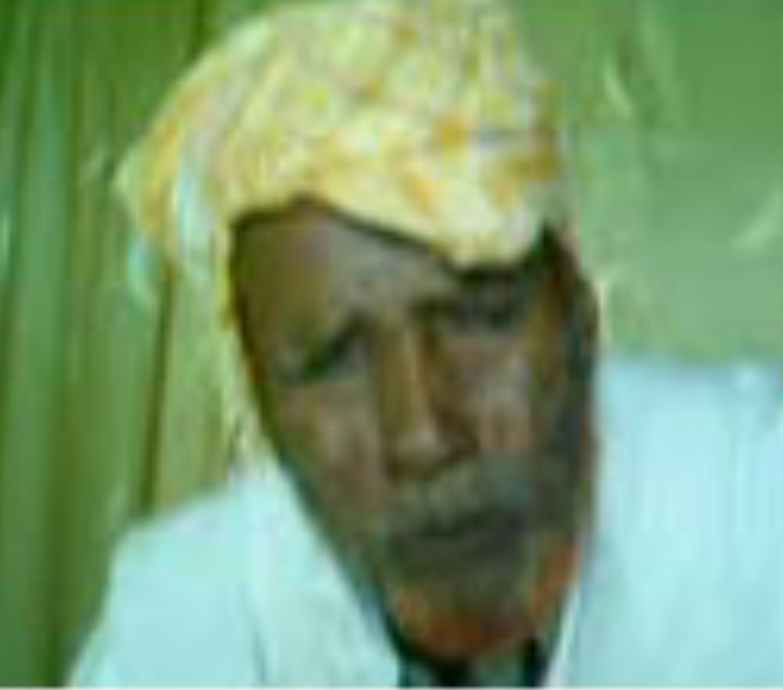
Jama Biixi Kidin, last resident of Silsilad

Although the term Taleh or Taleex is often used to describe the entire Dervish fort complex in the town, it more strictly applies to only one of the structures in a four-part compound. The latter complex includes Falat, Silsilad, Dar Ilaalo and Taleh.

The main fortress, Silsilat, is about 350 feet long by 300 feet broad. The two buildings next in importance are Dar llalo, the look-out tower, some 50 feet high, built on the top of a hillock close behind Silsilat, and Taleh (in a restricted sense) of similar height, built on lower ground to the east.

=== Horse stable ===
Besides the human habitation, Silsilad also had a horse stable whose substance commonly features in Somali popular culture:

Xamar weeye oo midab fardood, kala xiriir roone
Xawaar iyo kabtiyo raaxo iyo, xawli iyo jeefag
Xaggii loo eryaba waa, gammaan xulashadiisiye
Xubno toosanlow neefku waa, xaalad gooniya e
Goortaan xusuus ula noqdaa, xiiso ii qabane
Waxaan xarafka diimeed ahayn, igaga xeel dheere

Translation:

It is beige, and the horse's color contrasts revel outdoing (one another)
His walk, trot, canter, lope, gallop and back-gait
Wherever you turn (on him), he has no peer
Hey, vertical person, this mammal is peerless
Whenever I remember him, reminiscence hits me?
The only thing I like more than him, is my love for faith

Like other poems, horses as a symbol of love can also eruptly turn to belligerence:

Xiniinyaha ku goo baan lahaa, gaalka xaylka lehe
Xayskaa da'ayaan lahaa, Xalin ka doodeeye

Translation:

(whilst on his back) I pondered to cut off the testicles; from the (thus) menstruating colonialist
During the Xays rains, I planned to ensnare him from (the town of) Halin

One Dervish war tactic was hit-and-run, exemplified by dispersion in all directions:

... some 500 horsemen, was encountered, and at first it seemed that he would attack the column's rear-guard, but, when the mounted troops were withdrawn from the front to oppose him, his horse-men broke into groups and, when pursued, adopted the tactics which were subsequently to become so familiar to us, and split up into small parties which made off through a score of practicable passes in the stony hills.

Counter-tactics used by colonial forces were dehydrating when blocking Dervish horses' access to wells:

On June 15th, 238 rifles and 300 spearmen, under the command of Major A. G. Sharp, Leinster Regi-ment, were established in the fort of Bohotle to guard the reserve of supplies and to prevent the Dervish horsemen from watering at the wells

— Douglas Jardine

Dervish subdivided their horses into Barroor, a beige color, and Xamar, a chest-nut colored horse, alternating each depending on the intensity of the sun or heat. The largest Dervish horse stableyard outside Taleh was arguably Damot, also called Docmo, with large assemblages reported between 1900 and 1903.

Notable horses included Shan-maray, owned by Gaanni Gaalleef Cali Xaad which was the fastest horse in the Nugaal, Isxal was the main stallion used for breeding Dervish-owned horses,

== Demographics ==
The town of Taleh has a total population of 4,374 residents.

== Climate ==
Climate data for Taleh
Month	Jan	Feb	Mar	Apr	May	Jun	Jul	Aug	Sep	Oct	Nov	Dec	Year
Mean daily maximum °C (°F)	29.5 (85.1)	30.3 (86.5)	31.9 (89.4)	33.2 (91.8)	34.0 (93.2)	32.9 (91.2)	31.9 (89.4)	32.6 (90.7)	34.0 (93.2)	32.7 (90.9)	31.1 (88.0)	29.7 (85.5)	32.0 (89.6)
Mean daily minimum °C (°F)	14.0 (57.2)	15.1 (59.2)	16.2 (61.2)	19.1 (66.4)	20.8 (69.4)	21.4 (70.5)	21.4 (70.5)	21.1 (70.0)	21.0 (69.8)	18.6 (65.5)	15.6 (60.1)	14.9 (58.8)	18.3 (64.9)
Average precipitation mm (inches)	1 (0.0)	1 (0.0)	3 (0.1)	19 (0.7)	39 (1.5)	3 (0.1)	1 (0.0)	1 (0.0)	10 (0.4)	24 (0.9)	7 (0.3)	2 (0.1)	111 (4.1)
Source: Climate-Data.org

== Education ==
Taleh has a number of academic institutions. According to the Somaliland Ministry of Education, there are eight primary schools in the Taleh District. Among these are Kalad, Labas, Aroley and Halin.

== Notable people ==
- Sheikh Bashir - Somali religious leader, born at Taleh in 1905.
- Nur Ahmed Aman - One of the leaders behind the Somali Dervish movement, died at Taleh in 1907.
- Haji Sudi - One of the leaders behind the Somali Dervish movement, died at Taleh in 1920.
- Ibrahim Boghol - a member of the Dervish council, died at Taleh in 1920.
- Abdisamad Ali Shire - former Vice President of Puntland, born at Taleh.
- Abdikhadir Ahmed Aw-Ali - president of SSC-Khatumo State of Somalia, born at Taleh in 1972.
