= Ogaden (disambiguation) =

Ogaden is one of the historic names for the Somali Region of Ethiopia.

Ogaden may also refer to:

- Ogaden Basin, area in the Ogaden region that may hold reserves of crude oil and natural gas
- Ogaden (clan), Somali sub-clan of the larger Darod tribe
- Ogaden horse, horse breed of the Somali Region Ethiopia
- Ogaden War, 1977–1978 war between Ethiopia and Somalia over the Ogaden region

== See also ==
- 2007–2008 Ethiopian crackdown in Ogaden, military campaign of the Ethiopian Army against the Ogaden National Liberation Front
- Insurgency in Ogaden, conflict for self-determination in Ethiopia from 1992 to 2018
- Ogaden Anbassa, football club based in Harar, Ethiopia
- Ogaden National Liberation Front, social and political movement in the Horn of Africa
