= Insurgency in Ogaden =

Conflict in Somali Region, Ethiopia (1992–2018)

- Part of the conflicts in the Horn of Africa
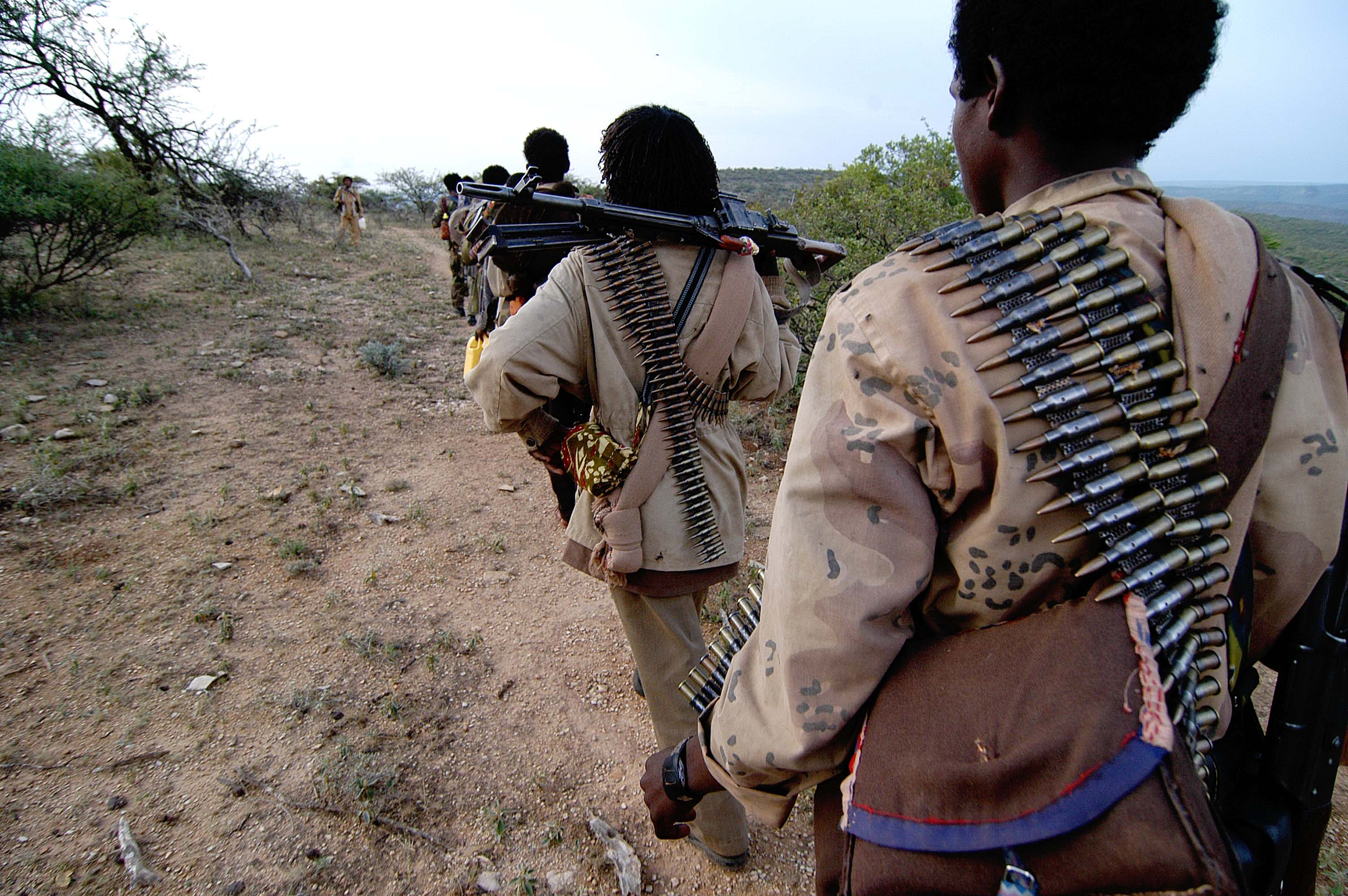
- A column of ONLF insurgents
Date	11 August 1992 – 12 August 2018 (26 years and 1 day)
Location	Somali Region, Ethiopia
Result	Peace agreement reached
Territorial changes	Status quo ante bellum

Belligerents
Ethiopia; Supported by: Somaliland	ONLF; Supported by: Eritrea; Egypt (alleged by Ethiopia) al-Itihaad al-Islamiya (1992–97)

Commanders and leaders
Meles Zenawi (1994–2012); Hailemariam Desalegn (2012–18); Samora Yunis (2001–18); Tsadkan Gebretensae (1994–2001); Abdi Illey (2010–18)	Abdirahman Mahdi; Mohamed Sirad Dolal †; Mohammed Omar Osman; Abdulahi Mohamed Sa'adi Hassan Turki; Hassan Dahir Aweys; Gouled Hassan Dourad; Adan Ayrow

Units involved
(Somali Region) Liyu Police	Unknown

Strength
182,500 (2011)	2,000–3,000 1,000

Casualties and losses
1,300 killed	1,430 killed 248 killed

The Insurgency in Ogaden was an armed conflict that took place from 1992 to 2018. It was waged by nationalist and Islamist Somali insurgent groups seeking self-determination for the region, primarily the Ogaden National Liberation Front (ONLF) and Al-Itihaad Al-Islamiya (AIAI). The war in the region began in 1992, when the Ethiopian government attacked AIAI in an attempt to suppress the growth of the organization. In 1994, the ONLF commenced its armed struggle and began publicly calling for a sovereign and independent "Ogadenia" state.

Following the Ethiopian invasion of Somalia in late 2006, the insurgency in the Ogaden significantly escalated after a decade of low-intensity conflict. The military occupation in Somalia coincided with the large-scale 2007–08 Ethiopian crackdown in Ogaden. The Ethiopian National Defence Force (ENDF) perpetrated grave human rights abuses against the civilian population in the region, including the widespread burning of villages, extensive wartime sexual violence, and mass murder of civilians. International agencies such as the Red Cross were expelled from the Somali region by the Ethiopian government. Human Rights Watch reported the ENDF engaged in scorched-earth tactics to fight the ONLF. The war resulted in the establishment of the Ethiopian Regional Special Forces in the mid-2000s, which soon proliferated across the country.

After raging for over 25 years, the conflict ended in a peace agreement in 2018 as part of Ethiopian Prime Minister Abiy Ahmed's reforms. During October 2024, the ONLF announced it is reassessing the 2018 agreement, citing a lack of progress on key provisions.

== Background ==
Map of the Somali Region.

Coinciding with the European colonial advances in the Horn of Africa during the late 1880s, Ethiopian Emperor Menelik II launched invasions into the Somali inhabited territory. The Ogaden region faced the brunt of the imperial military campaigns, during which the Ethiopian Empire imported a significant amount of firearms from European powers. The large-scale importation of European arms completely upset the balance of power between the Somalis and the Ethiopian Empire, as the colonial powers blocked the Somalis from receiving firearms.

The Ethiopian administration of the Ogaden was "sketchy in the extreme." Sporadic tax raids into the region often failed, and Ethiopian administrators and military personnel only resided in the major cities of Jijiga and Harar. Attempts at taxation in the region were called off following the massacre of 150 Ethiopian troops in January 1915.

In the years leading up to the Second Italo-Ethiopian War in 1935, the Ethiopian hold on the Ogaden remained tenuous. Due to native hostility, the region had nearly no Ethiopian presence until the Anglo-Ethiopian boundary commission in 1934 and the Wal Wal incident in 1935. The Ogaden region was formally incorporated into Ethiopia after World War II. It was ceded by the British to Ethiopia by 1955 despite protests of the Somalis, who saw the region as a geographical and political continuation of a Greater Somalia. Hopes of a unified Somali state were not realized as Ogaden was gradually incorporated into Ethiopia.

An independent Somalia later supported the Western Somali Liberation Front (WSLF), an armed separatist group formed out of the 1963–1965 Ogaden rebellion. In 1977, the Somali Democratic Republic invaded the Ogaden to support the WSLF and unify the region with the Somali state. After the Somali defeat in 1978, the Ogaden was turned into a militarized zone where population transfers were conducted in order to quell any signs of sedition.

=== Post-Ogaden War (1978–1991) ===
Following the Ogaden War, many supporters of the Western Somali Liberation Front (WSLF) became disillusioned with the organization's increasing reliance on Mogadishu, as well as growing frustrated by international portrayals of the struggle in the Ogaden as merely a border matter between Ethiopia and Somalia. Eventually, a new organization, the Ogaden National Liberation Front (ONLF), was founded in 1984 by six disaffected members of the WSLF; however the organization was immediately banned by the government of Siad Barre. During the 1980s, the newly formed Somali Islamist group Al-Itihaad Al-Islamiya (AIAI) focused on providing welfare to refugee camps housing Somalis displaced from the Ogaden region following the 1977–1978 war with Ethiopia. While the organization had initially begun as a relief organization among Ogaden Somali populations, its ultimate goal was to free the Ogaden region from what Al-Itihaad and other Somali factions, such as the WSLF and ONLF, perceived to be Ethiopian colonial rule. AIAI began establishing Islamic schools across refugee camps, alongside widespread mobilization of youth. Consequently, the organization gained a significant following in the Ogaden region.

=== Collapse of the Derg regime (1991) ===
In the meantime, the Eritrean People's Liberation Front and the Tigrayan People's Liberation Front overthrew the Ethiopian Derg dictatorship, leading to a period of political instability. The Ethiopian People's Revolutionary Democratic Front assumed power by establishing a coalition of ethno-nationalist movements from across the country, choosing the previously marginalised Ogaden National Liberation Front (ONLF) as its ally in Ogaden. ONLF's previously exiled leadership returned from exile, gaining the support of the local population. Eritrea attained independence in the aftermath of the Eritrean War of Independence, inspiring ONLF to pursue a similar goal for Ogaden.

== Timeline ==
During June 1991, the first general conference of Al-Itihaad Al-Islamiya was held in the Ogaden region, publicly establishing the organization and leadership in the territory. While AIAI had never renounced the use of violence, it first took a policy of cooperating with the directives of the newly formed post-Ethiopian Civil War government. In October 1991, Al-Itihaad formally registered as an Ethiopian political party. The organization also revealed the existence of its military wing to the government and delivered documents describing its political programme.

On 17 January 1992, at Garigo'an near Garbo, the Ogaden National Liberation Front central committee, led by Sheikh Ibrahim Abdallah, was elected. This would lay the foundation for an organized and cohesive organization.

=== Outbreak of insurgency (1992) ===
On 11 August 1992, Ethiopian government forces ambushed Al-Itihaad, killing the organization's top leaders and two dozen other high-ranking figures. Recent success in curbing the rise of organizations like the Oromo Liberation Front encouraged the Ethiopian government to eradicate Al-Itihaad before it had grown firm roots in the region. Following the killings, AIAI quickly regrouped and elected Sheikh Abdulsalam Osman to replace Sheikh Abdulahi Bade, who had been assassinated in the ambush. This marked the beginning of a conflict lasting several months in 1992 that would see a total of nine battles between AIAI and the Ethiopian military, ending in a ceasefire by the end of the year. The ceasefire would hold in the region until 1994.

==== Rise of ONLF (1993–2000) ====
Since 1992, the Tigray People's Liberation Front (TPLF), which dominated EPRDF, sought to curb Somali demands for self-determination by influencing politics in the region. In January 1993, ONLF candidate Abdillahi Mohammed Sadi was elected president of the Somali Region, having received 70% of the votes. Sadi was, however, sacked by TPLF officials seven months later, creating a power vacuum. Tensions between the TPLF and ONLF escalated in 1994.

In 1994, fighting between Ethiopian forces and the ONLF began at Werder, resulting in several days of clashes. Following 1995, armed conflict in the Ogaden sharply increased. During military confrontations between the ONLF and the military, government forces enacted brutal measures that included summary executions, extensive detentions without prosecution, enforced disappearances, and torture in a bid to crush the insurgency. In response to heavy-handed measures, the ONLF began reaching out to the Oromo Liberation Front (OLF) and the Afar Revolutionary Democratic Unity Front (ARDUF). Agreements to coordinate activities with both groups were signed. In response to this development, the EPRDF intensified operations and began labelling these groups "terrorists." In a bid to gain control of the region, different Somali leaders were imprisoned or assassinated by the central government. AIAI began fighting alongside the ONLF when Addis Ababa banned the party.

Despite an intensive government military campaign against the ONLF from 1994 to 1996, the organization survived and grew in strength. While the ONLF was effectively composed of numerous differing groups, the government's political interference and brutal counterinsurgency measures led many Somalis in the Ogaden to rally behind it. Previous internal fractures within the organization greatly dissipated in this period, resulting in the ONLF becoming a more cohesive force than it had ever previously been.

=== Insurgent build up (2000–2006) ===
Over the early 2000s, the ONLF's military capabilities expanded and the organization began stepping up attacks against Ethiopian military positions in the Ogaden, with a significant escalation in armed conflict occurring during 2005.

On 13 April 2003, ONLF initiated the Operation Mandad, aiming to expel government troops from the districts of Korahey and Dolo. Two days later, a battle took place in the towns of Alen and Garas Qalo. Security forces suffered 60 fatalities and lost 2 army trucks; 41 rebels were also killed in the fighting. Authorities responded by imposing curfews on the towns of Kebri Dehar, Warder, and Shilabo, alongside arresting 36 suspected militants. On 1 October 2005, insurgents launched attacks against government troops stationed in the towns of Hamarro and Fik, killing 4 and injuring 5 soldiers. On 2 October 2005, the town of Gasan and an army base located in the district of Kebri Dehar came under a militant attack; 5 soldiers were slain and 6 wounded. On 19 October 2005, rebels attacked an army encampment in the area of Kudunbur, 11 soldiers were killed and 13 wounded. On 15 November 2005, Ethiopian troops allegedly committed a massacre of 30 civilians and prisoners after the latter demanded better treatment from their captors.

On 21 May 2006, the ONLF entered into an alliance with five different Ethiopian opposition groups in an effort to strengthen the resistance to the TPLF-dominated central government. Included were the Ethiopian People's Patriotic Front, the Oromo Liberation Front, and the Sidama Liberation Front.

=== War in Somalia and escalation of insurgency (2006–07) ===
Direct links between the ONLF and Islamic organizations within Somalia, in particular Al-Itihaad Al-Islamiya, long predates the events of the mid-2000s. The Ethiopian government took advantage of the war on terror to routinely label opposition movements terrorists, and accused the ONLF of being associated with and linked to Al-Qaeda.

The ONLF had a covert relationship with and was supported by the Islamic Courts Union (ICU), which had risen to power in Somalia during 2006. The ICU was seen as a "natural ally." The Ogaden/Somali Region was at the heart of the dispute between the ICU and the Ethiopian government. A high-ranking ICU official had declared, following their rise to power, that, "The land taken by Ethiopia cannot be forgotten because it is attached to our blood ... Ethiopia mistreats the Somalis under their administration." On 23 July 2006, the ONLF announced the downing of an ENDF transport helicopter heading for Somalia and warned that Ethiopian military movements in the region pointed towards an imminent large scale operation. During November 2006, the ONLF declared that it would not allow Ethiopian National Defense Force troops to stage into Somalia from their territories.

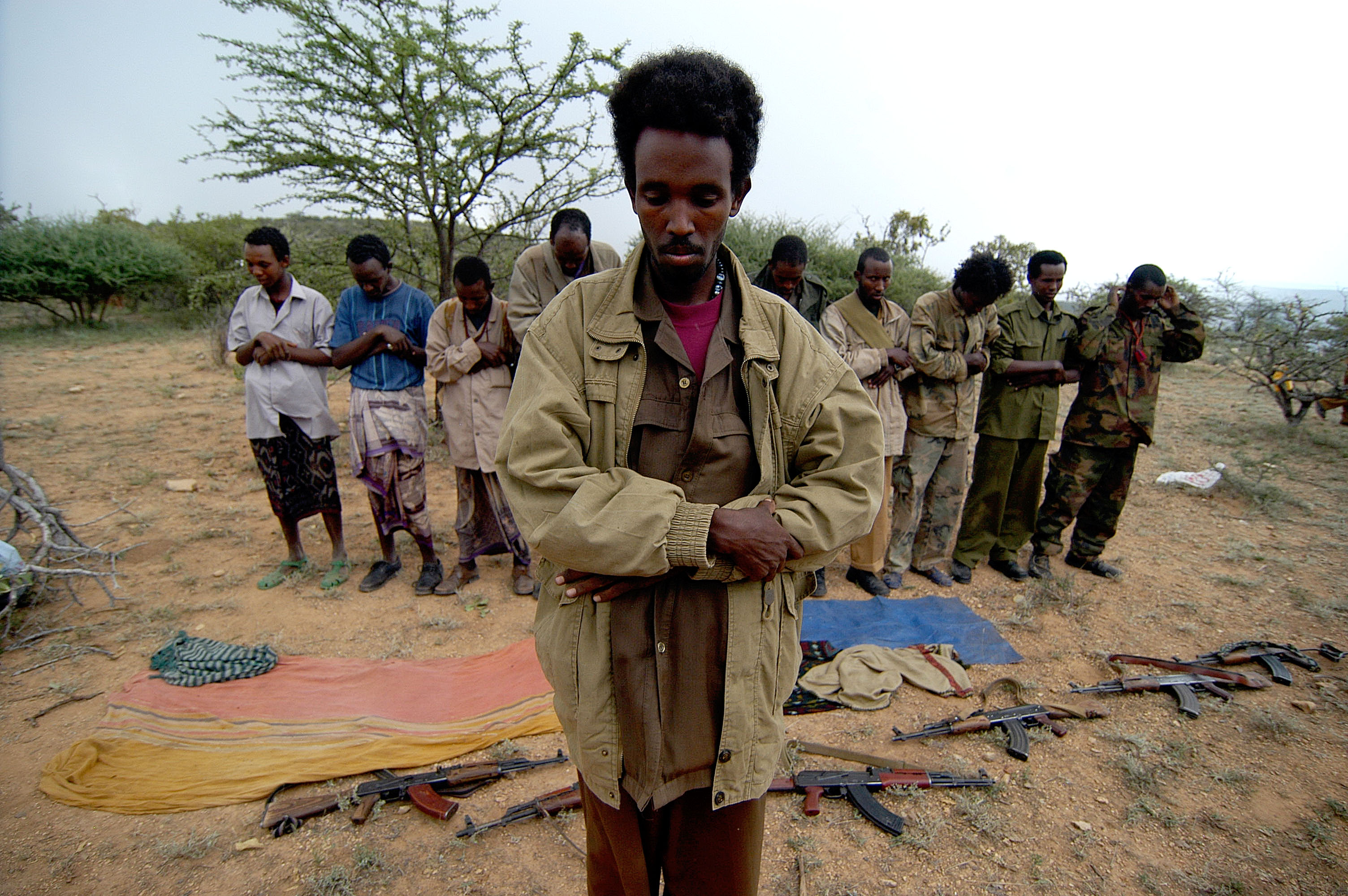
A group of ONLF rebels in 2006 performing Salah prayer.

On 23 December 2006, the ONLF reported attacking an Ethiopian military column that was heading to Somalia, destroying several vehicles, inflicting casualties, and driving the convoy back. At the start of 2007, the group publicly condemned the Ethiopian invasion of Somalia, stating that Meles Zenawi's invasion of Somalia demonstrated that his government had a clear agenda aimed at undermining Somali sovereignty. ONLF forces started escalating their attacks on Ethiopian military forces in early 2007 in reaction to the invasion of Somalia. The collapse of the Islamic Courts Union government was viewed as a significant blow to the ONLF's ambitions for independence.

In mid-January 2007, ONLF rebels attacked Ethiopian soldiers in Kebri Dahar, Gerbo, and Fiq. On 24 April 2007, the ONLF attacked the Abole oil field, killing 74 Ethiopian troops and several Chinese workers. The Ethiopian government claimed Islamic Courts Union fighters fought alongside the ONLF during the attack on the refinery.

=== Crackdown in the Ogaden (2007–08) ===
In response to the April 2007 ONLF attack, Ethiopian security forces initiated a large-scale counter-insurgency campaign against the ONLF. Between June 2007 and May 2008, approximately 1,000 people were killed as the opposing faction engaged in combat and committed human rights abuses. On 3 July 2007, an ONLF ambush outside the town of Shilaabo resulted in the deaths of 43 soldiers, the separatists suffered 5 casualties, and 8 rebels were injured.

On 22 January 2008, a government official announced the death of former top guerrilla commander Mohamed Sirad Dolal, following an operation in the Denan woreda of the Gode zone. By the time of his death, Sirad had left ONLF and operated as a commander of Al-Itihad Al-Islami.

On 3 August 2009, an Ethiopian court convicted Bashir Ahmed Makhtal, an Ethiopian-born Canadian citizen, to life in prison, on charges of belonging to ONLF. Makhtal denied all allegations, stating that the reason behind his prosecution is his relationship to one of ONLF's founding members. On 27 October 2009, an ONLF spokesman accused the governments of Puntland and Somaliland of handing over ONLF rebels to the Ethiopian security forces.

On 11 January 2011, Ethiopian authorities freed 402 previously imprisoned ONLF members as part of a peace deal previously signed with one of ONLF's factions. On 4 July 2011, government troops killed 15 and detained 6 rebels; 2 Swedish journalists accompanying the militants were also wounded during the engagement. On 2 September 2011, a band of ONLF rebels attacked a military convoy escorting Chinese oil workers, outside the city of Jijiga. The insurgents claimed to have killed 25 soldiers while suffering several casualties, but a government spokesman denied that the ambush had taken place.

Between 16 and 17 March 2012, according to a Human Rights Watch report, Ethiopian special police forces executed 10 civilians and looted dozens of shops in the village of Raqda. The attack came as a retaliation for the recent deaths of several policemen.

Between 10 and 24 October 2013, ONLF carried out attacks on 13 military outposts in the Korehey and Nogob zones; the faction claimed to have killed 24 soldiers during the operation. On 6 December 2013, government troops engaged insurgents in the Banbaas, Qolaji, and Hora-hawd villages. A rebel spokesman declared that 45 soldiers were killed in the battle, as rebels captured caches of weaponry and other equipment.

Between 1 June and 9 July 2014, five Ethiopian nationals were gunned down in the city of Garissa, Kenya. Investigations into the murders revealed the victims to be ONLF members or sympathizers. Three Ethiopians and two Kenyans were detained in connection with the murders. The perpetrators allegedly belong to Ethiopian government militias. An ONLF official accused the militias of killing at least 10 Ogadenian refugees between 2010 and 2011.

On 26 February 2015, a Liyuu police unit engaged in a skirmish with ONLF rebels in the Las-Galol village south-east of the city of Harar. A day earlier, clashes erupted in Galalshe, Jigjiga area. The incident took place amidst an escalation in fighting following the death of ONLF commander Mustafe Haybe, two journalists, and allegedly 120 government soldiers in recent engagements.

=== The 2018 peace agreement and post-ceasefire ===
In 2018, the Ethiopian government launched a number of reforms, part of which were removing the ONLF from its list of banned movements and offering the rebels more favorable conditions for a peace deal. Consequently, the ONLF declared a ceasefire in August, while it signed an official peace deal in October, alongside promising to disarm and transform into a political party. About 2,000 fighters were disarmed in the next months and were given lessons as well as offers to either switch to civilian jobs or become part of security forces.

==== Rising tensions (2024–) ====
Despite the peace deal holding and the ONLF being a legally recognized party, in September 2024, Ethiopian military chief Field Marshall Birhanu Jula accused the front of being an "enemy of the state" which had been allegedly created by Egypt. The following month, the ONLF announced it was reassessing the 2018 agreement, citing a lack of progress on key provisions.

In October 2024, leaders of the ONLF claimed that only 20% of the 2018 peace agreement's commitments, such as reintegrating former fighters and resettling displaced communities, have been met. Eventually, the group's spokesperson, Abdiqadir Hassan Hirmooge (Adani), voiced frustration with the Ethiopian government's inaction, declaring, "We maintained peace as agreed, but the government's failure to uphold its obligations raises serious questions about its dedication to lasting reconciliation." The ONLF also claims cultural suppression in the Somali region, alleging that Somali elders face pressure to renounce their identity and expressing concern over rumors that Ethiopia might alter the region's official name and flag, perceiving this as a threat to Somali cultural identity. On 20 October 2024, the ONLF withdrew from the Ethiopian National Dialogue Commission.

On 18 January 2026, in Jigjiga, the ONLF, Congress for Somali Cause (CSC), and the Somali Regional Democratic Alliance (SRDA) announced the formation of the Somali People’s Alliance for Self-Determination (SPAS). The alliance stated its creation was to unify the "Somali political agency" and end the "era of futile negotiation" with the Ethiopian government, which they accuse of repression and policies threatening Somali livelihoods, raising fears of renewed conflict in the region.

== Human rights situation ==
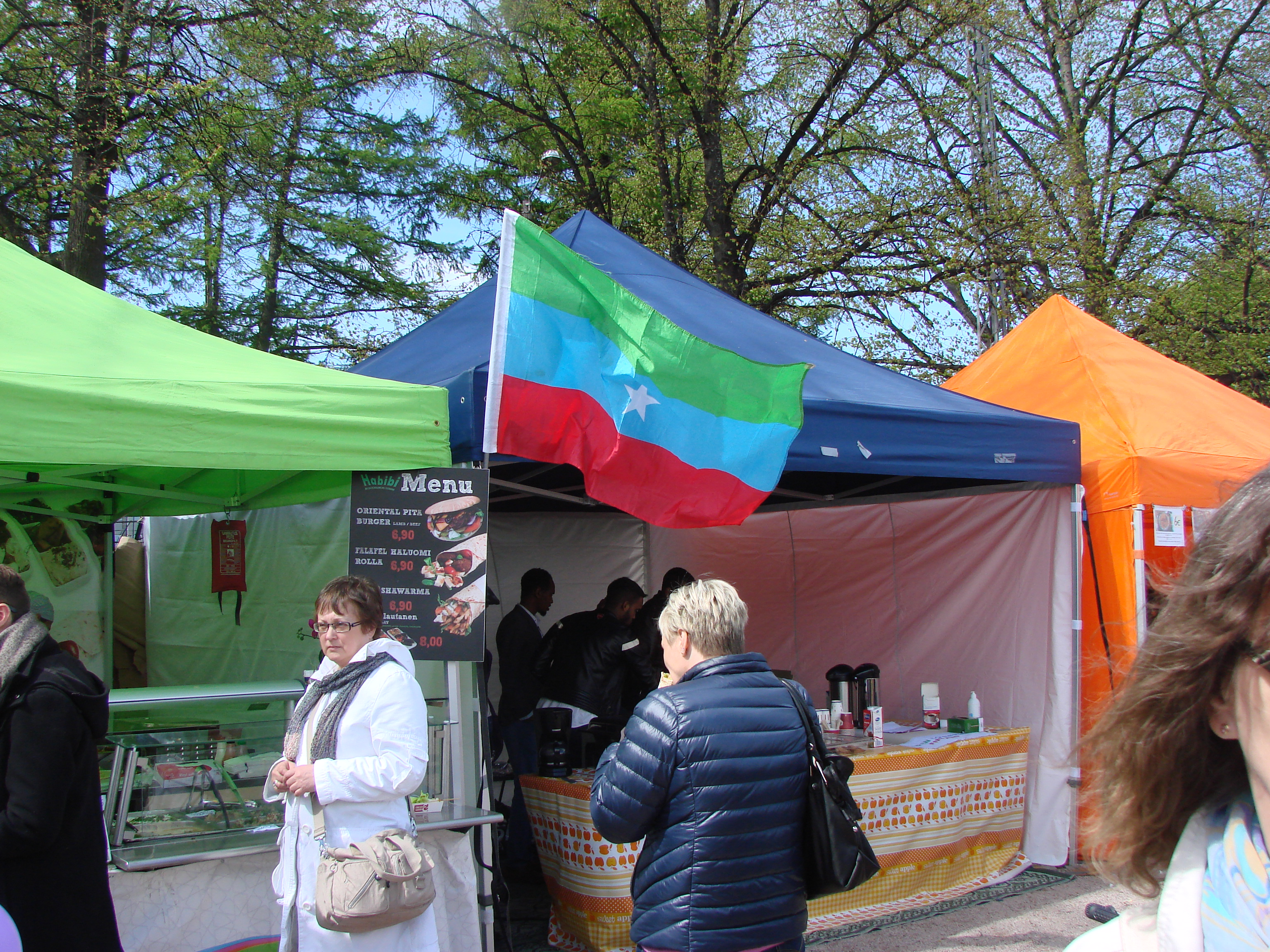
A group of Ogaden self-determination activists during the 2015 World Village Festival.

A number of non-governmental organisations have accused the Ethiopian military and police forces of committing human rights violations. A Human Rights Watch representative compared the actions of Ethiopian security forces to crimes against humanity. Furthermore, Ethiopian soldiers and policemen have reportedly participated in numerous instances of rape, arbitrary detention, selective killings, torture, and vandalism. In 2005, Ethiopian troops allegedly destroyed a village populated by the Armak minority, murdering the denizens with metal bars. New York Times journalists reporting on the story were detained without charges and had their equipment confiscated. Additionally, Ethiopia's tight control on the access of independent journalists into the region has complicated the examination of assertions made by both sides of the conflict. ONLF activists have repeatedly claimed that Ethiopian officials regularly utilize foreign aid as a form of blackmail, purposefully starving thousands of people. The above accusations have been dismissed by the Ethiopian government, which accused NGOs of acting as propaganda tools while completely ignoring abuses committed by the guerrillas.

== See also ==
- Papua conflict
- Ethiopian Civil War
- Red Terror (Ethiopia)
- Ogaden War
- War in Somalia (2006–2009)
