= Abole oil facility raid =

2007 armed attack in Somali Region, Ethiopia

Abole raid
- Part of Insurgency in Ogaden
- Map of Ethiopia highlighting the Somali region.
Date	24 April 2007
Location	Somali Region, Ethiopia

Belligerents
Ethiopia; Chinese oil workers	Ogaden National Liberation Front; Islamic Courts Union (Ethiopian claim)

Strength
Unknown	200 militiamen

Casualties and losses
- 64 Ethiopians killed, 9 Chinese killed

The raid on Abole oil exploration facility occurred in the early morning of 24 April 2007, when insurgents of the Ogaden National Liberation Front (ONLF) attacked the oil facility in the town of Abole, 30 km (19 mi) northwest of Degehabur, in the Somali Region of Ethiopia. The facility was operated by Zhongyuan Petroleum Exploration Bureau (ZPEB), a subsidiary of the China Petroleum & Chemical Corporation (Sinopec) which was contracted on behalf of Malaysian oil and gas multinational Petronas.

== Background ==
Before the raid on Abole oil refinery, the Ogaden National Liberation Front (ONLF) had made explicit threats against foreign companies working with the Ethiopian government to exploit the natural resources of the Ogaden/Somali Region.

Just after the full scale Ethiopian invasion of Somalia began in December 2006, the ONLF issued a statement declaring its solidarity with the anti-Ethiopian insurgency in Somalia, and along with other armed groups in Ethiopia - escalated the insurgency in Ogaden in response to the invasion.

== Raid ==
Chinese oil workers present at the site estimated about 200 fighters participated in the attack. A total of 74 people were reported to be killed in the attack, including 65 Ethiopians and nine Chinese workers who on site at the time. The Ethiopian government claimed several soldiers were wounded, while the ONLF claimed 400 soldiers were killed or wounded in the attack.

The ONLF stated that the attack had been launched to prevent the 'colonialist' Ethiopian government from exploiting the Ogaden region's natural resources. On the day of the attack, a spokesman for the ONLF in London announced:

"We have warned the Chinese government and the Ethiopian government that... they don't have a right to drill there...Unfortunately nobody heeds our warning and we have to defend our territorial integrity."

The Abole attack came just as Ethiopian forces across the border in the Somali capital Mogadishu were involved in fierce fighting with insurgents. The Ethiopian government claimed Islamic Courts Union fighters fought alongside the ONLF during the attack on the refinery.

== See also ==
- Ogaden Basin
- Insurgency in Ogaden
- Ogaden War
