= 2007–2008 Ethiopian crackdown in Ogaden =

Military campaign of Ethiopian Army against the Ogaden National Liberation Front

Ethiopian crackdown in Ogaden
- Part of the Insurgency in Ogaden
- Ogaden rebels filmed in an Al-Jazeera report.
Date	June 2007 – May 2008
Location	Somali Region, Ethiopia
Result	Indecisive; Both sides claim victory

Belligerents
Ethiopia: (Somali Region) Liyu Police	ONLF

Commanders and leaders
(Ethiopia) Girma Wolde-Giorgis (Ethiopia) Meles Zenawi	Unknown

Casualties and losses
375 killed (Ethiopian claim); 950 killed (ONLF claim)	~500 killed (Ethiopian claim)
- Civilian casualties: <1,000 killed

The 2007–2008 Ethiopian crackdown in Ogaden was a military campaign by the Ethiopian Army against the Ogaden National Liberation Front (ONLF). The crackdown against the guerrillas began after they killed over 60 Ethiopian troops and several foreign workers during a raid on a Chinese-run oil exploration field in April 2007.

The main military operations were centered on the towns of Degehabur, Kebri Dahar, Werder and Shilavo in Ogaden, which are in the Ethiopian Somali Region. The area is home to the Ogaden clan, seen as the bedrock of support of the ONLF.

During the crackdown, the Ethiopian government put hundreds of thousands at risk of starvation by blockading food aid to the region. According to Human Rights Watch (HRW), various human rights abuses were committed by the Ethiopian military.

== Background ==
=== Insurgency ===
Ethiopia's eastern Somali Region, whose major part constitutes the Ogaden, has been the site of a long-running, low-intensity armed conflict between the Ethiopian Government and the ONLF. Formed in 1984, many of the ONLF's members had supported Somalia during the Ogaden War with Ethiopia over the region in the 1970s. The group's aims have varied over time from independence to joining a "greater Somalia" or obtaining greater autonomy within Ethiopia.

=== April–May 2007 ONLF attacks ===
List of abbreviations used in this article

ONLF: Ogaden National Liberation Front
TPLF: Tigrayan People's Liberation Front
UN: United Nations
HRW: Human Rights Watch
ICRC: International Committee of the Red Cross
OCHA: Office for the Coordination of Humanitarian Affairs
UIC: Union of Islamic Courts

== Timeline ==
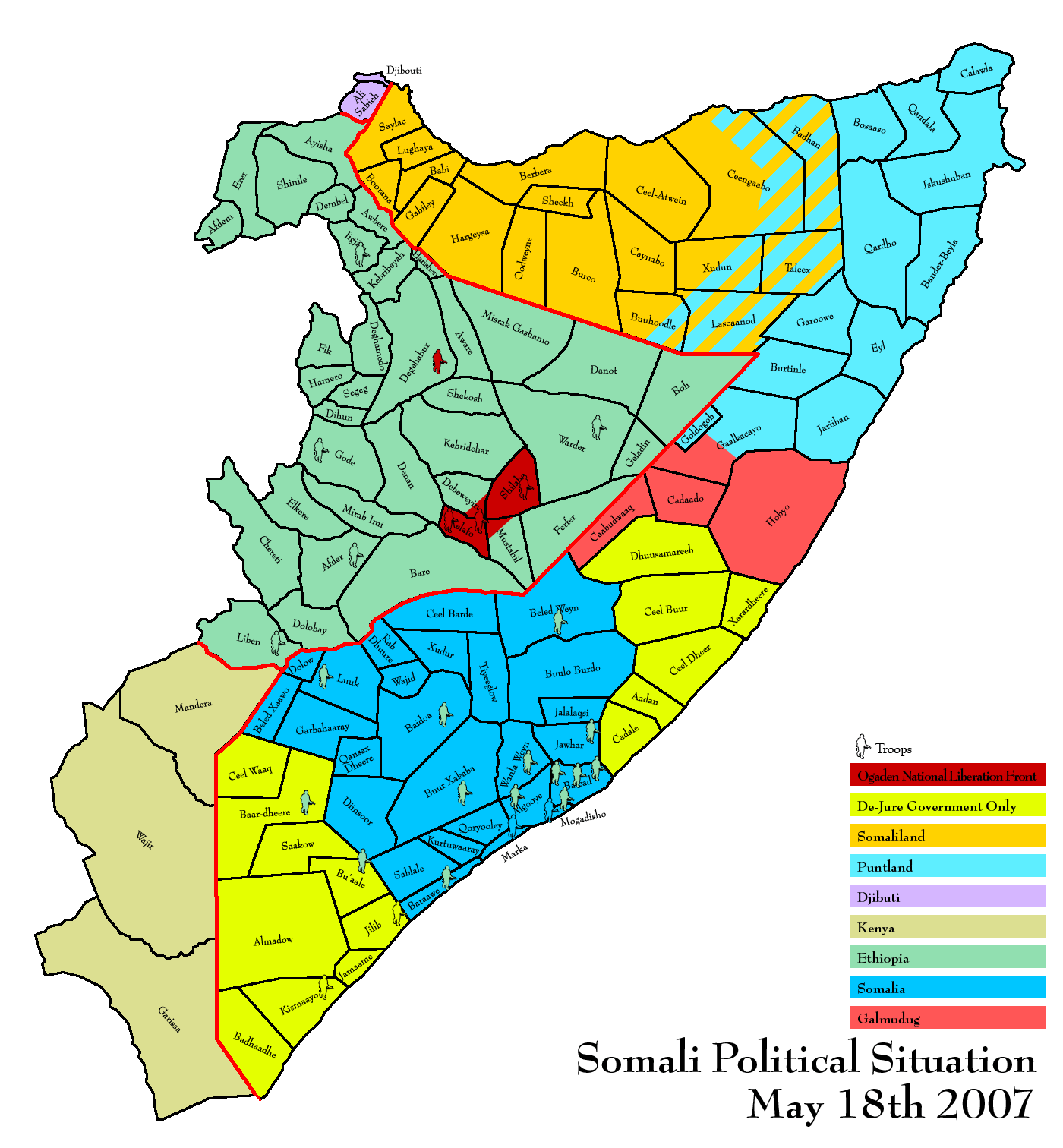
Areas of fighting on 18 May 2007, shown in dark red.

On October 21, 2007, the ONLF stated its forces had killed 250 Ethiopian soldiers during the battle near the town of Werder. There was no confirmation of the attack or the casualty figures either from the Ethiopian Government or from independent sources. On November 4, the ONLF claimed that up to 270 Ethiopian soldiers had been killed in clashes between October 26 and November 1. Once again, the claim could not be independently verified.

On November 16, 2007, the Ethiopian Army claimed to have killed 100 ONLF fighters during the past month, and to have captured hundreds more. On November 18, 2007, the ONLF reported that the Ethiopian Air Force had carpet bombed villages and nomadic settlements the Ogaden region, killing up to a dozen civilians. An ONLF spokesman said that some ONLF fighters were also injured in the air bombardments, but the air force targeted civilian settlements and livestock. The Ethiopian Government denied these reports on November 20. On November 28, 2007, Ogaden residents described continued abuses on the part of the military, but also said that aid delivery had improved. UN humanitarian chief John Holmes said the humanitarian situation in Ogaden was "potentially serious" but not yet catastrophic. Prime Minister Meles Zenawi said that human rights abuses and a humanitarian crisis "didn't exist. Doesn't exist. Will not exist."

In January 2009, the foreign relations chief Mohammed Sirad was killed by Ethiopian security forces at the town of Danan as he met with other ONLF members. Reportedly this has led to the ONLF splitting into two factions, with one group allied to current ONLF chairman Mohammed Omar Osman, and the other led by senior leader Abdiwali Hussein Gas, who appointed Salahudin Ma'ow as the new ONLF chairman and declared that he will "bring Mohammed Omar Osman to court".

== Allegations of human rights abuses ==
=== Abuses perpetrated by the Ethiopian military ===
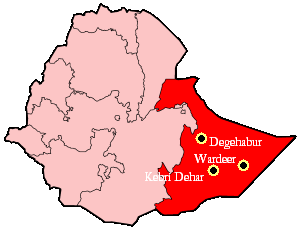
Ethiopian Somali Region and major flashpoints.

Ethiopia's military campaign has triggered a serious humanitarian crisis, according to several humanitarian organisations.

According to Human Rights Watch, civilians in the Somali Region were trapped between the warring parties. HRW learned that dozens of civilians have been killed in what appeared to have been a deliberate effort to mete out collective punishment against a civilian population suspected of sympathizing with the rebels.

Refugees fleeing the crackdown told stories of widespread violence, with entire villages being destroyed along with arbitrary theft, rape and murder by Ethiopian soldiers. In October 2007, The Independent reported that the situation in Ogaden had begun to mirror the Darfur conflict, with refugees stating that government troops had burned villages and raped and killed civilians. Earlier in the month, Human Rights Watch had told the United States House Foreign Affairs Subcommittee on Africa and Global Health that "the Ogaden is not Darfur. But the situation in Ogaden follows a frighteningly familiar pattern", while recognizing that "Ethiopia has legitimate and serious domestic and regional security concerns". Also, the United Nations advocacy director for Human Rights Watch has called Ogaden a "mini-Darfur". Human Rights Watch says it has documented dozens of cases of severe abuse by Ethiopian troops in the Ogaden, including gang rapes, burned villages and what it calls "demonstration killings," like hanging and beheading of populace, meant to terrorize the population.

=== Forceful draft of civilians ===
Several Ethiopian refugees and international organizations reported in December 2007 that the Ethiopian military, strained by its deployment in Somalia, was forcing local civilians (including government employees and health workers) to fight alongside troops against the ONLF rebels. According to the same reports, these under-equipped and poorly trained militias suffered heavy casualties in several battles. One Western aid official said soldiers barged into hospitals to draft recruits and threatened to jail health workers if they did not comply. In other cases, lists of names were posted on public bulletin boards, ordering government employees to report for duty, according to a current member of the regional parliament and two Ethiopian administrators who have fled the country. Many of those who refused were fired, jailed and in some cases tortured, the administrators and parliament member said.

Ethiopian officials denied the charges, claiming that local tribes were willingly forming defense groups against the ONLF. Several United Nations officials and Western diplomats said they were discussing the militia program in private meetings, but contended they could not comment publicly for fear of provoking the ire of the Ethiopian government, resulting in a possible suspension of humanitarian efforts in the region.

=== Blockade of food aid and starvation ===
During the crackdown, the Ethiopian government put hundreds of thousands at risk of starvation by blockading food aid to the region. Western humanitarian officials reported that the government was attempting to starve out the region in order to beat the rebels.

== Expulsions of humanitarian agencies ==
Large segments of the region were inaccessible to outside agencies as Ethiopian troops attempted to suppress the rebel insurgency.

On November 6, the United Nations Office for the Coordination of Humanitarian Affairs (OCHA) announced opening an aid facility in the Ogaden region. The U.N. has also called for an independent investigation into allegations of human rights abuses by Ethiopian forces in the region. Government troops are fighting ONLF rebels who want more autonomy for their region. Médecins Sans Frontières is among the 12 organizations that have received permission to work in Ogaden, while the ICRC is still barred from working in the region.

== The Eritrea and Somalia factors ==
Experts say the ONLF was active in the Somali capital Mogadishu during 2006 while that city was controlled by the Islamic Courts Union, and that some Islamist fighters may have fled to Ogaden after they were ousted from Mogadishu.

== See also ==
- Ogaden War
- Ethiopian Civil War
- War in Somalia (2006–2009)
- List of wars 2003-current
