= Mukhtal Dahir =

Leader of the Ogaden rebellion (1963–1977)

Makhtal Dahir
- Leader of the Nasrullah Movement
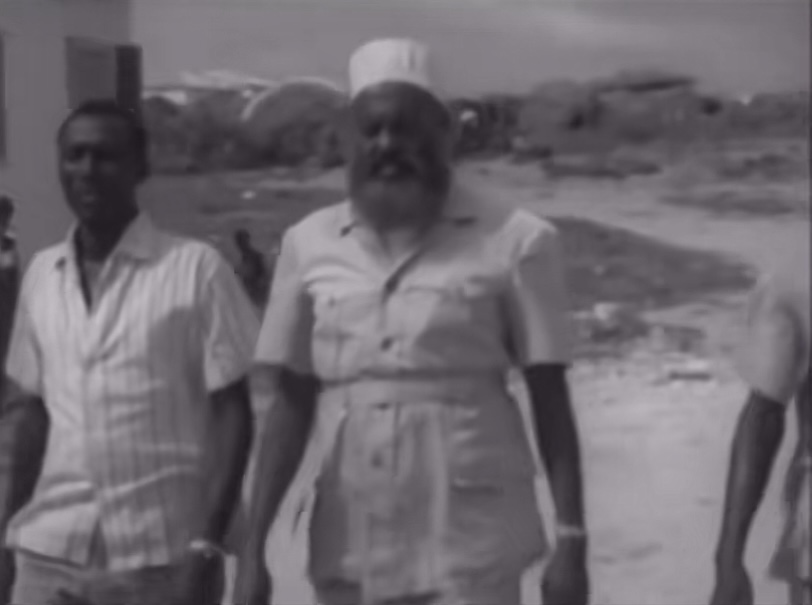
- Dahir in the 1960s
- Born: c. 1894; Ogaden (modern-day Somali Region, Ethiopia)
- Died: 2000
- Issue: Bashir Ahmed Makhtal (grandson)
- Religion: Islam

Mukhtal Dahir (Somali: Makhtal Dahir; Arabic: مختل ظاهر; c. 1894 – 1999) was a Somali traditional leader and nationalist figure from the Ogaden region. He is best known as the founding leader of Nasrullah, an insurgent movement that fought against the rule of the Ethiopian Empire in the Ogaden from 1963 onwards. The movement is regarded as a direct predecessor to the Ogaden National Liberation Front (ONLF) and the Western Somali Liberation Front.

== Early life ==
Mukhtal Dahir was born around 1894 in the Ogaden (Eastern Ethiopia) into a respected Somali family lineage. Oral traditions describe him as a local clan elder with strong influence in the Wardheer–Qabri Dahar area. During the mid-20th century, as Ethiopian central control expanded into the Somali-inhabited territories, Dahir became increasingly involved in anti-colonial and nationalist politics.

== Nasrullah Movement and Ogaden Uprising ==
In June 1963, Somali clans in the Ogaden convened at the settlement of Hodayo, near Werder, and declared a general uprising against Ethiopian rule. Mukhtal Dahir was chosen as the head of the movement, which was named Nasrullah ("Victory of God").

The Nasrullah fighters carried out raids on Ethiopian garrisons and disrupted administrative control in large parts of the Ogaden. The insurgency continued into the 1970s, eventually giving way to the newly formed ONLF.

== Arrest and later years ==
Following the early years of fighting, Dahir was captured by Ethiopian forces and imprisoned for over a decade. Sources report that Emperor Haile Selassie later pardoned him, allowing him to return to his community, where he remained a respected elder until his death in 2000 at an estimated age of 106.

== Legacy ==
Mukhtal Dahir is remembered by Somalis in Ethiopia, Djibouti, and Somalia as one of the earliest leaders of organized resistance against Ethiopian rule in the Ogaden. His leadership of the Nasrullah movement inspired later generations of Somali nationalists and served as a foundation for the ONLF.

His grandson, Bashir Ahmed Makhtal, later became a prominent figure in human rights circles, often citing his grandfather's struggle as an inspiration.

== See also ==
- Ogaden War
- Ogaden National Liberation Front
- Haile Selassie
- Somali nationalism

== Notes ==
- Some historical sources refer to the 1963 rebellion as the "Ogaden Liberation Front" movement, but most primary accounts describe it by its Arabic name Nasrullah.
