= Battle of the Marmar Mountains =

2010 military engagement in Somaliland

Mar-mar Mountains Clash
- Part of Insurgency in Ogaden
Date	September 14, 2010
Location	Mar-mar Mountains, Awdal, Somaliland
Result	Ethio-Somaliland victory
Territorial changes	ONLF forces effectively expelled from Awdal, Somaliland

Belligerents
ONLF	Somaliland; Ethiopia

Commanders and leaders
Hasan Bosaso (POW)	Yonis Awale

Strength
200	Unknown

Casualties and losses
123 rebels Killed	Unknown

The Mar-mar Mountains Clash was a military engagement that occurred on September 14, 2010, between joint Ethiopian and Somaliland forces against the Ogaden National Liberation Front (ONLF) rebels. The clash took place in the Mar-mar mountains in the Awdal region of Somaliland, close to the border with Ethiopia. The clashes reportedly took place after Somaliland authorities found 200 rebels who docked on the Somaliland coast where they chased them down, capturing two and wounding one more.

== Background ==
The Ogaden National Liberation Front (ONLF) is a separatist group based in the Somali region of Ethiopia, fighting for the independence of the Ogaden region. The ONLF has had a long-standing insurgency against the Ethiopian government, and their activities have also brought them into conflict with neighboring Somaliland, which shares a border with Ethiopia. The situation in the region had been tense, with ONLF forces operating in the cross-border areas of Somaliland and Ethiopia, making the region a hotspot for military confrontations.

== Clash ==
On September 14, 2010, Ethiopian military forces engaged ONLF fighters in the Mar-mar mountains of Somaliland. Eyewitnesses reported that the battle began around midday after Ethiopian forces encircled the ONLF rebels. The Somaliland army subsequently intervened and joined the Ethiopian forces in fighting the ONLF from their side of the border.

Both sides shelled the rebel positions, but casualties on either side were not immediately disclosed. There were reports of displacement in the surrounding areas due to the intensity of the clashes. The engagement highlighted the continued instability in the Horn of Africa and the growing tensions between the ONLF, Ethiopia and Somaliland.

== Aftermath ==
The Ethiopian and Somaliland forces reiterated their commitment to eradicating ONLF forces in the region.

The clash resulted in the displacement of civilians in the affected areas, raising concerns over the humanitarian situation in the region. The situation remained volatile, with both the ONLF and regional forces continuing to fight for control of the contested areas.
