= Aleen ambush =

2007 ambush of an Ethiopian military convoy

- Part of Insurgency in Ogaden
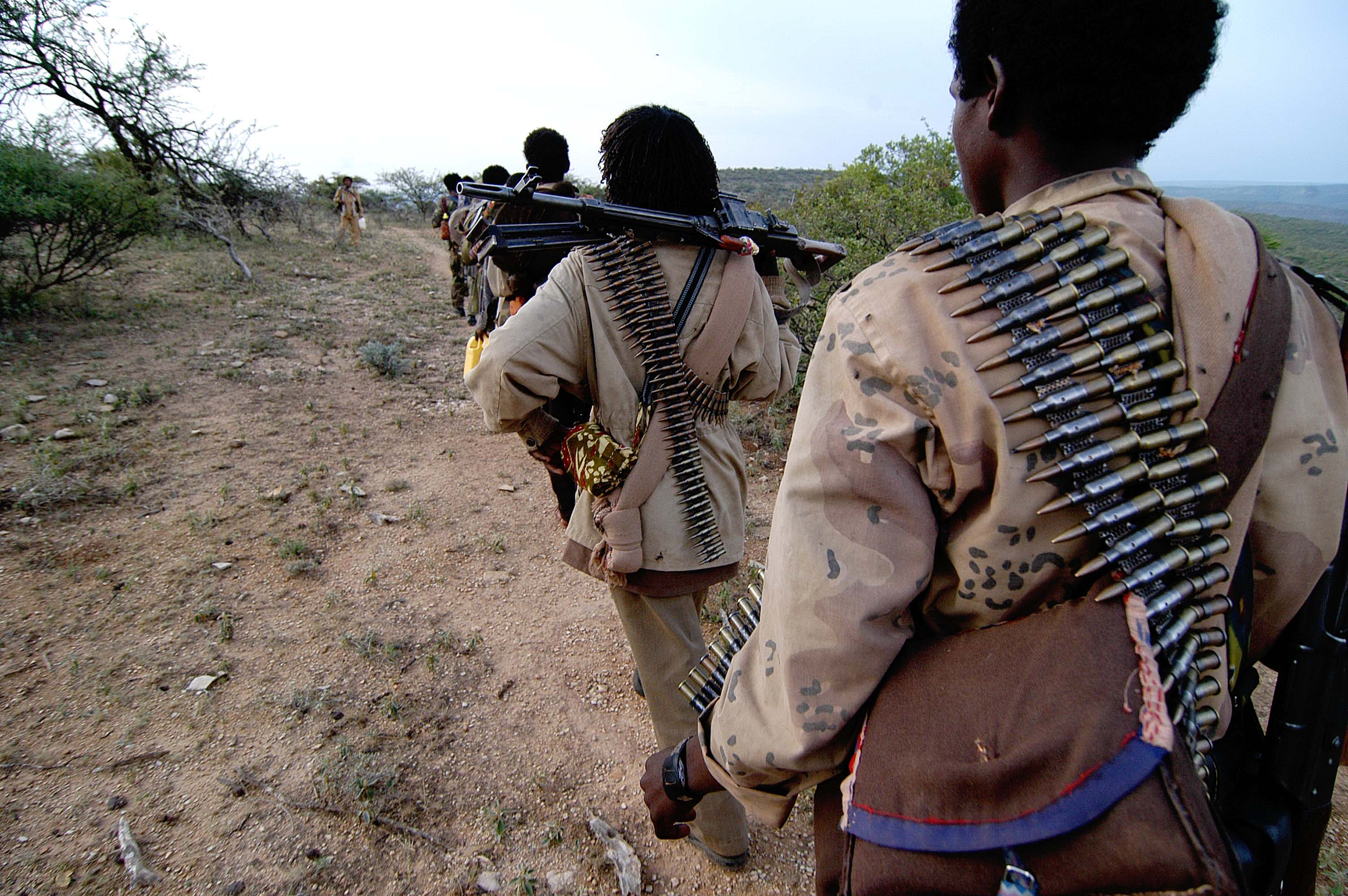
- Column of ONLF rebels
Date	July 2, 2007
Location	Near Shilavo, Ogaden, Ethiopia
Result	ONLF victory

Belligerents
ONLF	Ethiopia

Strength
unknown	"Twenty Armed vehicles and trucks carrying troop reinforcements,fuel and armaments"

Casualties and losses
5 killed, 8 wounded	43 killed, 35 captured

The Aleen ambush was an engagement between the Ogaden National Liberation Front (ONLF) forces and Ethiopian troops on July 2, 2007, during the insurgency in the Somali Region of Ethiopia.

== Background ==
The Ogaden National Liberation Front, a separatist group advocating for the independence of the Ogaden region, had been engaged in an insurgency against the Ethiopian government since 1984. The conflict intensified in 2007 after a major ONLF attack on a Chinese oil installation in Abole earlier that year, resulting in the deaths of several Chinese and Ethiopian workers. The Ethiopian military subsequently launched a crackdown, leading to heightened clashes throughout the region.

== The ambush ==
The Aleen Ambush took place near Shilaabo, in the vicinity of a small village known as Aleen. ONLF fighters set up a carefully planned ambush against an Ethiopian military convoy. According to reports, the ambush resulted in heavy casualties among Ethiopian troops. The ONLF claimed that their forces killed more than 43 Ethiopian soldiers during the engagement.

Ethiopian government sources disputed the ONLF's account, downplaying the scale of their losses. Independent verification of casualty figures was not possible due to restricted access to the region.

== Aftermath ==
The ambush was part of a broader wave of violence in the Ogaden region in 2007. Following this engagement, the Ethiopian government intensified military operations against the ONLF, leading to widespread reports of human rights abuses, including the targeting of civilians in areas suspected of harboring ONLF fighters. Rights groups accused the Ethiopian military of using indiscriminate violence in the region, contributing to a humanitarian crisis.

The ONLF continued its insurgency for several years before entering peace negotiations in the late 2010s.
