= Mohamed Sirad Dolal =

Ethiopian rebel

Mohamed Sirad Dolal Maxamed Siraad Doolaal
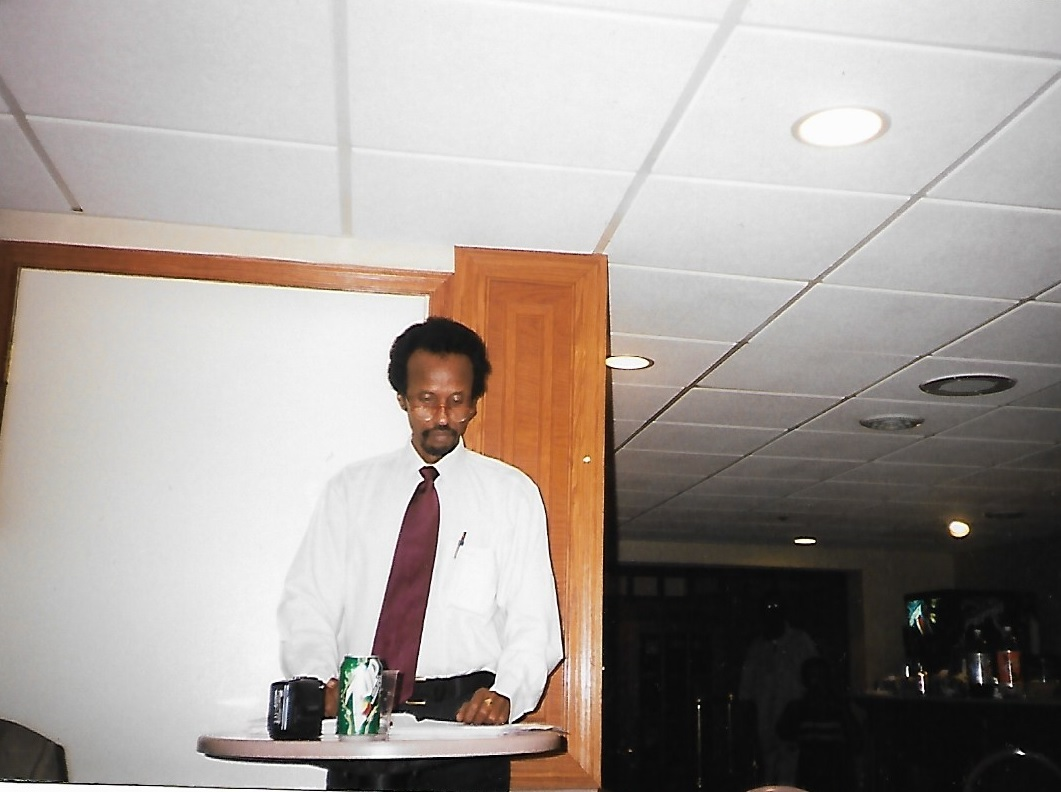

Foreign Affairs Secretary of ONLF
- In office 1998–2006
- Preceded by: Abdirahman Mahdi

Personal details
- Born: 1955 Kebri Dahar, Ethiopian Empire
- Died: January 17, 2009 Danan, Ethiopia
- Education: Somali National University London School of Economics University of Leeds
- Occupation: Academic, political activist

Mohamed Sirad Dolal (Somali: Maxamed Siraad Doolaal) was an academic and a member of the central committee and executive council of the Ogaden National Liberation Front (ONLF), a Somali nationalist organization which seeks self determination for the Somali-inhabited Ogaden.

== Early life and education ==
Dolal was born and raised in Qabri Dahar, Qorahay Province, in the Somali Region of Ethiopia. Mohamed Siraad Dolaal's parents died when he was a child, and he grew up as an orphan, although his uncle, Mohamud Dolaal, took over the responsibility of taking care of him and enrolled him in school a year after his father's death. Mohamed Sirad Dolal was born with three of his sisters and had six daughters and a son. Dr. Dolal's father was killed by the Ethiopian military in a war in 1964 when Dolal was only 9 years old. It is worth mentioning that Dr. Dolal's father's body was not seen as his body was not seen in 2009, when the Ethiopian military killed him in a battle similar to his father's in Ogadenia.

He completed his formative education in his birthplace of Kebri Dehar. He graduated from Medhanealem School in Harar in 1972. He also earned a Bachelor of Arts (BA) degree from his undergraduate studies at the premier Somali National University (SNU) in Lafoole, Afgoye, Somalia. He later went onto graduate school, where he earned a Master of Arts (MA) degree at the London School of Economics (LSE) in England in 1991 and finally received a Doctor of Philosophy (Ph.D.) at the University of Leeds in Leeds, England.

During his school years, he became outspoken and passionate about Ogaden's lack of development and how the region was annexed to Ethiopia.

== Career ==
In 1973, he started his first work at Ethiopian Water Authority Agency. He left the work in June 1977, when the Ogaden War erupted in the region, at which time he joined freedom fighters Western Somali Liberation Front (WSLF). He was wounded in the battle at Goray in 1978, from Harar. Goray is the second village close to Jigjiga after Dhagaxle, where he almost lost his right hand.

During his stay in Somalia, he was regularly involved in campaign efforts to secede away from Ethiopia. He also was a college lecturer and practicing social science researcher, who had frequently undertaken field trips across Somalia from Baidoa to Bosaso, Kismayo to Mogadishu.

In the 1980s, he was an active member of Youth of Western Somali Liberation Front WSLF, which later became Ogaden National Liberation Front ONLF; for the involvement of secret rebellion, he went to prison at Mogadishu.

On January 17, 2009, Dr. Dolal's life ended when he was wounded, captured, and executed along with several of his colleagues by Ethiopian soldiers in Dhanan, Ogaden.

He was based out of London, England, and had been survived by his wife and six children.
