= Islamic nationalism =

View that all Muslims constitution a single nation

Islamic nationalism, also known as Muslim nationalism, is a form of religious nationalism that seeks to advance Muslim interests by combining nationalism with Islamism. It holds the view that all Muslims constitute a single nation, known as the Ummah, by virtue of their adherence to the Islamic religion and should unite under a single universal Islamic state. Critics argue that nationalism is inherently incompatible with Islam, as Islamist ideology rejects the Western notion of nation-states, which usually appeal to unity based on linguistic, cultural, ethnic, and territorial factors.

== Examples ==
=== Pakistan ===
Unlike the secular form of nationalism which is espoused in most other countries, Pakistani nationalism is religious in nature, consisting of Islamic nationalism. Muslim nationalism is an essential part of the creation of Pakistan. Before India's independence, the All India Muslim League first espoused the interests of India's Muslim minority and in the face of the impending independence of India, switched its position to demand freedom from India's Hindu majority in the form of the creation of Pakistan.

While religion was the basis of the Pakistani nationalist narrative the country's creation can easily be seen as the one form of the culmination of Muslim nationalism in South Asia, especially of the kind of Muslim nationalism led by Muhammad Ali Jinnah's All India Muslim League. Pakistani nationalism is closely associated with Muslim heritage, the religion of Islam, and it is also associated with pan-Islamism, as it is described in the Two-nation theory. It also refers to the consciousness and the expression of religious and ethnic influences that help mould the national consciousness. Pakistan has been called a "global center for political Islam."

=== Bosnia and Herzegovina ===
In Bosnia and Herzegovina, Islam plays a significant role in Bosniaks' national identity. Alija Izetbegović, who later became Bosnia and Herzegovina's first independent leader, issued the Islamic Declaration during the Yugoslav era, emphasizing the differences between Muslims and the surrounding South Slavs, who adhered to various Christian denominations.

=== Palestine ===
Hamas views Palestine as a holy land and considers it a primary front for jihad, framing its resistance as an Islamic way of fighting Israeli occupation. The group has sought to fuse Islamism with Palestinian nationalism, presenting itself as a nationalist movement with an Islamic nationalist agenda, distinct from secular nationalist movements. Article 12 of the 1988 Hamas charter asserts that "Nationalism from the point of view of the Islamic Resistance Movement is part and parcel of religious ideology."

=== Somalia & Ethiopia ===
The Western Somali Liberation Front (WSLF) and its predecessor Nasrallah, which fought for the independence of the Ogaden region from Ethiopia, both adopted an ideology of Islamic nationalism. Despite a clear emphasis on Somali liberation, the WSLF found support among Ethiopian Muslim Harari and Oromo populations.

=== Xinjiang/East Turkestan ===
The Turkestan Islamic Party is an Uyghur nationalist, pan-Turkist, and jihadist organization seeking to create an Islamic state based around Sharia law called "East Turkestan" which would immediately include all of the Chinese province of Xinjiang, with the gradual goal of including parts of Turkey and Pakistan and all of Kazakhstan, Kyrgyzstan, Uzbekistan, and Afghanistan. TIP also has a branch in Syria which has been aligned with the al-Nusra, and more recently with the new Syrian transitional government.

=== Iran ===
The Islamic Revolutionary Guard Corps of Iran has been considered as having an ideology similar to Islamic nationalism.
