= Ogaden Basin =

Basin in Ogaden region that reserves crude oil and natural gas

The Ogaden Basin is an area of Huwan that may hold significant reserves of crude oil and natural gas. The basin covers an area of some 350,000 square kilometres (135,000 square miles) and is formed from sedimentary rocks up to 10,000 meters (6 miles) thick. It has geological similarities to other hydrocarbon-rich basins in the Middle East.

== Hydrocarbon exploration and development (Ogadenia) ==
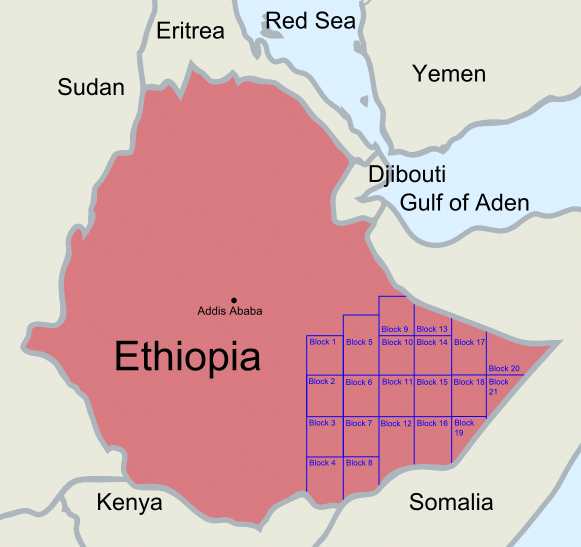
Exploration blocks in the Ogaden Basin and Kismayo Coast

The first exploration in the basin was undertaken by Standard Oil in 1920 More recent exploration by Tenneco resulted in the discovery of an estimated 68 million cubic metres (2.4 billion cubic feet) of gas in 1974. Development of the reserves in the basin's Jeexdin and Elale gas fields is being carried out by the Gazoil Ethiopia Project, a joint-venture partnership between the government of Ethiopia and Texas-based Sicor announced in December 1999.

The basin has been divided into 21 blocks, and exploration rights have been awarded for many of them. Companies with concessions in the basin include Netherlands registered Pexco Exploration, Petronas (Malaysia), Lundin East Africa (Sweden), SouthWest Energy Ltd. (Hong Kong), and Afar Explorer (USA).

== Political instability and armed conflict ==
The Ogaden War between Ethiopia and Somalia took place for the control of the region between 1977 and 1978, with a further clash in 1988. In recent years the armed wing of the Ogaden National Liberation Front (ONLF) has been active, and the rebel group has stated that they will not allow the resources of the region to be exploited, urging international oil companies not to sign agreements with the Ethiopian government.

On April 24, 2007, members of the ONLF attacked and destroyed an oil exploration facility within the basin near Obala and Abole, killing approximately 65 Ethiopians and 9 Chinese nationals in the Abole raid. The facility was being operated by the Chinese Zhongyuan Petroleum Exploration Bureau, a subsidiary of Sinopec, on behalf of the Malaysian oil multinational Petronas.

== See also ==
- Economy of Ethiopia
- Energy in Ethiopia
