= 1963–1965 Ogaden rebellion =

Failed revolt in Ethiopia

Ogaden rebellion
- Part of Ethiopian–Somali conflict and Opposition to Haile Selassie
Date	13 June 1963–1965
Location	Ogaden, Ethiopian Empire
Result	Revolt suppressed

Belligerents
Ethiopian Empire	(Somalia) Nasrallah Front

Commanders and leaders
(Ethiopian Empire) Haile Selassie (Ethiopian Empire) Merid Mengesha (Ethiopian Empire) Aklilu Habte-Wold	(Somalia) Mukhtal Dahir

Casualties and losses
Unknown	Unknown, likely several thousand

The 1963–1965 Ogaden rebellion was an uprising and insurgency by the Somali population of the Ogaden region in the Ethiopian Empire against attempts at taxation and cultural assimilation by the government of Emperor Haile Selassie. Somali leader Mukhtal Dahir, a founding member of the Somali Youth League, led the insurgency after demands for self-determination by regional leaders were consistently ignored. The rebellion, which at its peak controlled nearly 70% of the Ogaden region, originated from long-standing tensions between the Somali and Ethiopian populations, exacerbated by harsh military crackdowns and punitive expeditions by Ethiopian forces.

Despite the rebels receiving material support from the Somali government, they operated independently of Mogadishu. The Ethiopian government's attempts to regain control over the region were impeded by the challenging terrain for the army and the rebels' effective guerrilla tactics. However, the Ethiopian Imperial Army's 3rd Division, after an air campaign and regrouping, managed to regain significant portions of the territory, though the insurgency persisted.

Emperor Haile Selassie's response to the rebellion involved repressive measures and collective punishment against the Somali population, leading to severe deterioration in Ethio–Somali relations and laying the groundwork for the 1964 Ethiopian-Somali Border War. The war resulted in a decrease in insurgent activity, but the rebellion's impact continued. Despite the armistice between the Ethiopian Empire and the Somali Republic, the Ogaden rebels, seeing their fight as separate, vowed to continue their resistance. By 1965 the rebellion had mostly subsided, though insurgent elements remained active until the formation of the Western Somali Liberation Front (WSLF) in 1973.

== Background ==
In the aftermath of World War II, Somali leaders in the Ogaden region of the Ethiopian Empire persistently advocated for self-determination. Despite their efforts, both the Ethiopian government and the United Nations consistently disregarded their demands. The 1950s saw Somali leaders begin covertly recruiting followers for an anticipated rebellion under the umbrella of two organizations: Nasrallah, an Arabic term meaning "sacrifice for Allah's cause," and the Ogaden Company for Trade and Industry (OCTI). Mukhtal Dahir, one of these leaders, was a founder of the Somali Youth League's (SYL) branch in Harar in 1946 and played a key role in the 1949 Jijiga revolt. After the revolt, he sought refuge in Somalia, but was arrested by the British Military Administration in charge of Somalia post-WWII and then turned over to the Ethiopian government. Dahir received a death sentence but was subsequently pardoned and spent the next 10 years in prison in Addis Ababa.

In the mid-1950s, Ethiopia for the first time controlled the Ogaden and began incorporating it into the empire. Hardly a single paved road, electrical line, school or hospital was built by the central government. The Ethiopian presence in the region was always colonial in nature, primarily consisting of soldiers and tax collectors. The Somalis were never treated as equals by the Amhara invaders and were scarcely integrated into the Ethiopian Empire. In his first post-war visit to the region, Ethiopian Emperor Halie Selassie announced on 25 August 1956 that the Somali people were, "...by race, colour, blood and customs members of the great Ethiopian family". He advised Ogaden residents to accept cultural assimilation by learning the Amharic language, dismissed the possibility of the Ogaden Somalis joining a future independent Somali state and finally invited all Somali people to join Ethiopia.

In April 1961 a group of nearly 100 Somali refugees arriving in Hargeisa from the city of Degehabur in the Ogaden reported that the Ethiopian army had surrounded the city and then machine gunned residents. Referring to the incident as a massacre, the refugees claimed the attacked resulted in the deaths of over 150 Somalis. The reprisal had been in response to a petition created by Somali leaders in the region requesting independence from Ethiopia. The following year, Mukthal Dahir would be released and appointed the district commissioner of Degehabur.

== Outbreak ==
On 16 June 1963, the Ethiopian government began its first attempts to collect taxes in the Ogaden region, greatly incensing the already discontent Somali population, as they had lived without taxation for centuries. At Hodayo, a watering place north of Werder, 300 men of Nasrallah picked Mukhtal Dahir to lead an insurgency against the Ethiopians under the banner of the al-Jaysh ( الجيش in Arabic) or Jabhada (the front). The group was most commonly referred to as Nasrallah, though often referred to by foreigners as the Ogaden Liberation Front. The organization would form the foundation of the future Western Somali Liberation Front. Some of the guerrillas were equipped by the Somali government, though Dahir would later allege that the only substantial support that they had received from Somalia had been related to treating wounded and taking in refugees.

== The Nasrallah insurgency ==
For several months the insurgency fought against the Ethiopian army, swelling from just 300 to an estimated 3,000 to 12,000 insurgents (estimates greatly vary) and eventually forming a "liberation government". Many neutral Ogaden Somalis had been alienated by the loss of relatives, herds and homes in Ethiopian reprisal raids on their border villages, inflaming the resistance. At its peak, the combined forces of the insurgents controlled nearly 70 percent of the Ogaden region. Primarily, their operations were conducted in the lowland Hararghe and Bale provinces of Ethiopia. In a bid to control the largely nomadic population of the region during 1963, an Ethiopian Imperial Army division based out of Harar torched Somali villages and carried out mass killings of livestock. Watering holes were machine gunned by aircraft in order to control the Somalis by denying them access to water. Thousands of residents were driven from the Ogaden into Somalia as refugees.

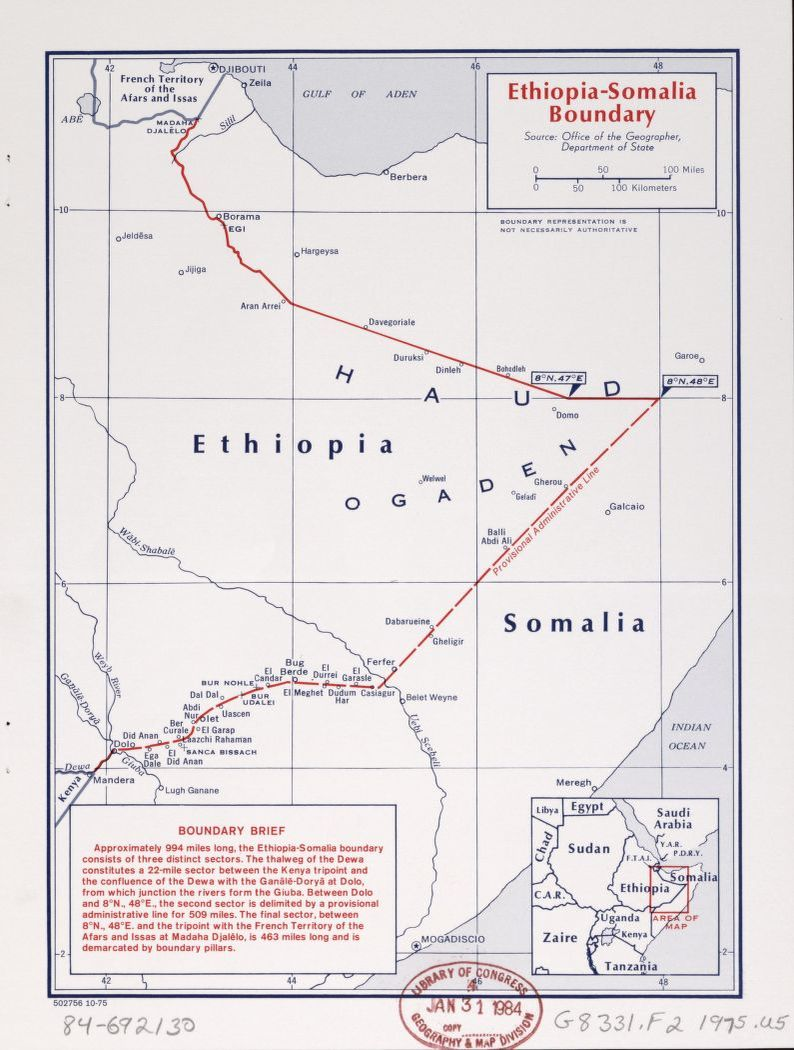
Ogaden region and Ethiopian-Somalia border

The insurgencies surprising early success is attributed to the terrain advantage the Ogaden offered, ideal for traditional guerrilla hit-and-run tactics, placing the mechanized troops at a large disadvantage. The insurgents honed their skills in ambushing military convoys, leading the Ethiopian army to restrict its operations to administrative centers. In response these centers were reinforced and deployed motor patrols, which were repeatedly ambushed by rebels seeking to obtain arms. The Ethiopian army's lackluster performance against the insurgents bolstered their confidence, encouraging them to expand their activities. However, their hit-and-run tactics ultimately proved insufficient to weaken the strategic control of the Ethiopian Empire.

According to the Central Intelligence Agency, Ethiopian Defense Minister General Merid Mengesha would come under fire for the poor showing of the military against the Ogaden rebels.

The Ethiopian government argued that the conflict was a result of armed bandits being sent across the border by Somalia to harass the country into ceding a large slice of Ethiopian territory, to which the Somali government repeatedly denied that the it either inspired or fomented the troubles in Ogaden. Despite the Ethiopian government's allegations, it was widely recognized that the Somali government could assert no real control over the Ogaden insurgents, as the rebels had made it clear that they were not willing to take orders from Mogadishu, despite desiring its recognition. A CIA report submitted to U.S. President Lyndon B. Johnson would conclude, "Somali authorities show no ability to control the tribesmen whose depredations so infuriate the Ethiopians."

=== Suppression of insurgency and first border clashes ===
In August 1963 Ethiopian forces regrouped and the 3rd Division of the Imperial Army swept back through the Ogaden with relative ease, aided an eight-week-long air campaign against Somali targets on both sides of the border and the inexperience of the guerrillas. Despite regaining control of large portions of the region the 3rd Division was unable to stamp out the insurgency.

By September 1963 the insurgents were reported to have some 3000 members. The rebels were severely hampered by the lack of an integrated command structure and weaponry needed to combat the 3rd Division. That fall insurgents were noted to be active in Degehabur, Wardheer, Qabridahare, Fiq, Godey, and Kelafo, where they overran police stations and ambushed army convoys.

Ethiopian Emperor Haile Selassie responded to the insurrection with brutal and repressive crackdowns against the Somalis in the Ogaden region. The Ethiopian government began mounting punitive expeditions on Somali nomads, which consisted of the total destruction or confiscation of livestock in the Somali nomadic pastoral communities. Most infamous of these reprisals was on the town of Degehabur in what became known locally as the "Kanone Massacre". Degehabur was bombarded by artillery from nearby high ground, which was followed by a killing spree when army troops later entered the settlement. In another notable incident following rebel activity in the town of Shilabo, the Ethiopian army blockaded and shelled the city to punish the inhabitants. The news of these crackdowns exacerbated the already deteriorating relations between Somalia and Ethiopia, and clashes between their forces began to break out in late 1963 and early 1964. Though the newly formed Somali government and army was weak, it had felt pressured and obliged to respond to what Somali citizens widely perceived as oppression of its brethren by an Ethiopian military occupation.

== 1964 Border War and decline ==
During the 1964 war most insurgent activity in the Ogaden halted as rebels went to bolster the Somali border. Following the war the insurgency declined under military pressure from Ethiopia and diplomatic pressure from Somalia.

=== Postwar ===
It was widely recognized during the Khartoum negotiations that any peace accord with the Somali government would not halt the Ogaden insurgency and numerous international observers professed the belief that no genuine lasting progress could be made unless a degree of recognition was given to the nature of the Ogaden liberation movement, which many regarded by many as a genuine independence movement. These concerns were confirmed following signing of the peace accord between Somalia and Ethiopia, when leader of the Ogaden insurgency Muktal Dalhir declared he would ignore the truce, stating:

"My people are under no one's jurisdiction and take orders from no one but me. We have no intention of observing any cease-fire. Our fight with Ethiopia has nothing to do with Somalia. We are indifferent to the government position, though we still expect and hope our movement will be recognized both by Somalia and by the world."

After the war the Ethiopian military once again began taking punitive measures against the Somalis of the Ogaden. In May and July 1964, over 22,000 domestic animals were either killed or confiscated by Ethiopian troops, devastating Somali nomads' most precious source of income, resulting in what amounted to economic warfare on the nomadic way of life. The Ethiopian government also introduced a new policy of land registration to encourage Amhara farmers to resettle in the valuable pastureland's in and around the Ogaden that were used by Somali nomads' herds as grazing areas. Under the new laws, nomads had no recognized claim to these territory and were harassed by the military as a result. Wells frequented by Somali nomads were poisoned, and new ones were created for the incoming migration of Amhara farmers.

For nearly a year after the war, most major Somali towns in the Ogaden were under military administration and curfew.

In 1965, a delegation from the "provisional revolutionary government of the Ogaden" visited Syria to protest Ethiopian aggression. By 1965, the insurgents ran out of ammunition, and were being chased out of the region by the imperial army, although insurgent elements remained active until the formation of the Western Somali Liberation Front (WSLF) in 1973.
