= Abdulahi Mohamed Sa'adi =

Abdullahi Mohamed Sa’adi

founder of the Somali region of Ethiopia

Abdullahi Mohamed Sa’adi (born 1934) was a Somali politician from the Somali Regional State of Ethiopia. He served as the first president of the region from January to July 1993.[1][2]

Early life and education

Abdullahi Mohamed Sa’adi was born in 1934 in Fik, the main town of the Nogob region in the Ogaden, Ethiopia. At the age of 14, he moved with his family to Harar, where he attended primary school. He later continued his intermediate and high school studies in Addis Ababa.[1]

Career

In 1956, Sa’adi moved to Somalia, where he began his political career. In December 1964, he addressed the United Nations General Assembly, speaking about the Ogaden conflict.

Later in 1964, he emigrated to Kenya, where he started a business. In early 1976, he returned to Somalia to continue his political activities and participated in the Ogaden War of 1977.[1]

That same year, he was appointed as the representative to Kuwait for the Western Somali Liberation Front (WSLF). He later joined the newly formed Ogaden National Liberation Front (ONLF).

The Somali government later called for his return, but fearing prosecution, he applied for political asylum at the Swedish embassy in Kuwait, after which he moved to Sweden.[1]

In 1992, Sa’adi became one of the 45 founding members of the ONLF central committee. On 23 January 1993, he was elected as the first president of the Somali Regional State of Ethiopia. However, he was removed from office in July 1993 and was succeeded by Hassan Jire Kalinle.

== Career ==
In early 1956, Sa'adi went to Somalia, where he started his political career. He addressed the United Nations General Assembly in December 1964 about the Ogaden War. In 1964 he emigrated to Kenya, where he started a business. In early 1976, he returned to Somalia to carry on his political career, and he participated in the Ogaden war in 1977.

In 1977, Sa'adi was appointed as representative to Kuwait of the Western Somali Liberation Front. Later, he joined the newly formed Ogaden National Liberation Front. Later, the Somali government called for his return, but, fearing prosecution, he applied for political asylum at the Swedish embassy in Kuwait, and he then moved to Sweden.

Sa'adi was among the 45 members of the central committee of the liberation front, which was established in 1992. He was elected president of the newly established state of Somali on January 23, 1993, but he was removed from office in July 1993, succeeded by Hassan Jire Kalinle.
