= Abole =

Coordinates: 10.95°N 39.5°E

Abole (also known as Obole) is a town 30 km (19 mi) northwest of Degehabur, in the Somali Region (also known as Ogaden) of Ethiopia. On April 24, 2007 an attack on an oil facility in the town by the rebel ONLF group left 74 people dead, including Chinese nationals.
