= Bashir Makhtal =

Canadian terrorist (born 1977)

- Born: 1977 (age 48–49); Ethiopia
- Status: Freed

Bashir Ahmed Makhtal (Somali: Bashiir Axmed Makhtal; born 1977) is a Canadian citizen formerly held in an Ethiopian prison, where he was accused of terrorism and faced the death penalty. The Canadian government was criticized by several groups for its initial inaction on demanding Makhal's release, including Amnesty International.

== Biography ==
Makhtal was born in Ethiopia to Somali parents, who had fled war-torn Somalia in 1972. His grandfather was a founder of the rebel group Ogaden National Liberation Front (ONLF), which is classified as a terrorist organization by Ethiopia. In 1991, Bashir immigrated to Toronto, Canada, where he studied computer science at the DeVry Institute of Technology, later completing his bachelor's degree in Texas. In 1994 he was granted Canadian citizenship, and was employed as a computer programmer by the Bank of Montreal and CIBC.

In 2002, Makhtal travelled to the United Arab Emirates, from which he travelled to Djibouti, Kenya, Eritrea, and Somalia, selling clothing to support himself. In 2006, after Ethiopia's militarily intervention in Somalia, Canadian Foreign Affairs advised Canadians in Somalia to flee the impending conflict. Makhtal flew to neighboring Kenya, but was arrested during the flight. After spending three weeks in Nairobi jail, Makhtal was extraordinarily renditioned to the Ethiopian-backed government in Somalia, which extradited him to Ethiopia. Makhtal was accused of being a member of the ONLF based on the prior membership of his grandfather, as well as collaborating with the Somali terrorist group al-Shabab. The Ethiopian government denied Makhtal representation in court by his Canadian lawyer, saying that Makhtal was already being represented by an Ethiopian lawyer. The Ethiopian court found Makhtal guilty of being a member of the ONLF and working with the Eritrean government to organize the financing, recruiting, and training of ONLF militants. Several reports claimed that Makhtal was tortured by interrogators while in prison, though the Ethiopian government denied this. In June 2007 he was able to have a letter delivered to his family.

Throughout Makhtal's imprisonment, many people in Canada, including Makhal's family, called for his release. Makhtal's wife, Aziza Osman, campaigned for both his release and that of her uncle, who faced a similar renditioning. In August 2009, Makhtal's Canadian lawyer announced that he would sue the Canadian government to force it to halt aid to Ethiopia unless Makhtal was released. In December 2009, after the Ethiopian Supreme Court rejected Makhtal's appeal, his relatives in Canada asked Canadian Prime Minister Stephen Harper to directly intervene in the case.

On April 18, 2018, Makhtal was released from prison, and returned to Canada on April 21.

== Reactions ==
=== Canada ===
At the time of Maktal's imprisonment, the ruling Conservative Party was accused by the NDP and the Liberal party of not aiding non-white Canadians imprisoned in foreign countries. After being assured of Maktal's well-being in March 2008, the Canadian government sent Deepak Obhrai, Parliamentary Secretary to the Minister of Foreign Affairs, to Ethiopia in June to inquire about Maktal's situation. In February 2009, the Canadian government announced that it would seek Makhtal's release.

=== Ethiopia ===
Responding to accusations of human rights violations, the Ethiopian government accused Western countries of not condemning the attacks of the Ogaden National Liberation Front.

== See also ==
- Human rights in Ethiopia
- Ogaden National Liberation Front
