= Abdirahman Mahdi =

One of the founders of the Ogaden National Liberation Front

Leader of the Ogaden National Liberation Front
- Incumbent
- Assumed office 2019
- Preceded by: Mohammed Omar Osman

Personal details
- Born: Ethiopia
- Military career
- Allegiance: Ogaden National Liberation Front
- Service years: 1984–present
- Conflicts: Ethiopian civil conflict

Abdirahman Mahdi is a Somali nationalist politician in Ethiopia who is the leader of the Ogaden National Liberation Front (ONLF), a political movement determined to allow the people of Ogaden to exercise their right to self-determination in the Horn of Africa and its current Chairman since November 12, 2019. The ONLF was formerly considered a terrorist organisation by the government of Ethiopia until the Ethiopian Parliament unanimously removed the ONLF from its list of terrorist organisations as part of a political reconciliation and peace process in July 2018.

In addition, Mahdi is also a member of the central committee and executive council, highest decision-making bodies, of the ONLF. Furthermore, he is the current vice president. of the Unrepresented Nations and Peoples Organization (UNPO), elected at its XII General Assembly held at the Flemish Parliament in Brussels on 4 July 2015.

== Early life ==
During his youth, Mahdi would be displaced from his home during the 1964 war.

== Career ==
Mahdi founded the ONLF on August 15, 1984, along with five other prominent Ogadeni activists: Mohamed Ismail Omar, current vice chairman of the ONLF; Sheikh Ibrahim Abdalla Mohamed, former chairman of the ONLF (1991–1998); Abdi Ibrahim Ghehleh, former trade unionist; Abdirahman Yusuf Magan, former WSLF member; and Abdullahi Muhammed Sa'adi, former WSLF representative in Kuwait. The ONLF is currently led by Chairman Abdirahman Mahdi, who was elected to the post at a 2019 national convention.
