= Danan, Ethiopia =

Danan
- Location within Ethiopia
- Coordinates: 6°30′N 43°30′E
- Country: Ethiopia
- Region: Somali
- Zone: Gode

Population (2018)
  - Total: 87,380
- Time zone: UTC+3 (EAT)

Danan (Somali: Dhanaan) (or "Denan") is a town in the eastern part of Ethiopia known as the Ogaden. Located in the Gode Zone of the Somali Region (or kilil), and it is located the main road between Gode and Kebri Dahar (Qabridahare) the nearest towns with electricity. This town was settled in 1911, and took the name of the district in 1935 during Emperor Haile-silase's rule of Ethiopia. This town has a latitude and longitude of 6°30′N 43°30′E.

== Overview ==
Danan has a camp for refugees and internally displaced persons. The Ogaden region is populated mostly by ethnic Somalis and has been devastated by drought, famine and an armed separatist movement. Temperatures in Danan soar daily to well over 110 degrees creating some of the most unbearable living conditions in all of Africa. The Denan Project, the only humanitarian organization in the town, was founded to provide qualified medical care to the people of Danan. Its hospital is the only free acute medical care in the Ogaden region which is populated by 5 million people.

The Ethiopian Roads Authority announced in November 2007 a construction project to connect Danan with Kebri Dahar with 95 kilometers of paved road and construction of six large and medium bridges.

== History ==
Danan fell to the Italians in January, 1936 as part of the Second Italo-Abyssinian War. As part of the reprisals for the attempted assassination of General Rodolfo Graziani (19 February 1937), it was used as a prison camp for hundreds of people arrested as part of the reprisals. While Ethiopian sources state of 6500 internees held there 3175 died, contemporary Italian reports claim that much fewer were ill and only a handful died. Alberto Sbacchi concludes from these conflicting reports that while "the occurrence of illness and death is difficult to determine, but we can assume that many suffered and died. Graziani's order to supply them with only enough food to live strongly suggests it, as do the conditions under which the Ethiopians were confined. Poor facilities, including latrines, the humid climate, malaria, stomach infections, and venereal disease took many lives, especially among those compelled to work on the irrigation canal or on the banana and sugar-cane plantation."

In January 2009, the foreign relations chief of the Ogaden National Liberation Front, Mohammed Sirad, was killed by the Ethiopian Army at Danan where he was meeting with other ONLF members.

== Demographics ==
Based on figures from the Central Statistical Agency in 2018 projection, Danan has an estimated total population of 87,380, of whom 49,703 are men and 37,677 are women. The 1997 census reported this town had a total population of 34,428, of whom 20,038 were men and 14,390 women. The largest ethnic group reported in this town was the Somali (99.96%). It is the largest settlement in Danan woreda.
