= ZPEB =

The Zhongyuan Petroleum Exploration Bureau (or ZPEB) is a Chinese oilfield services company. It is a subsidiary of Sinopec, one of China's national oil companies.

== Ogaden attack ==
The company was operating in 2007 in the volatile, predominantly Somali Ogaden region of Ethiopia in 2007. At the time the Ogaden National Liberation Front waged an insurgency against the Ethiopian government. The company and its employees suffered grievously as collateral damage in the war at 4:30 AM on April 24, 2007 when 200 ONLF militants attacked the company's camp in Abole, Somali Region. A firefight raged for 50 minutes between the attackers and 100 Ethiopian troops guarding the camp. The attack left 9 Chinese and 65 Ethiopians dead and 9 Chinese were taken as hostage.

== Projects ==
- Sudan: The company was an early Chinese pioneer in performing geophysical surveying and drilling in Sudan.
- Ethiopia Petronas, the Malaysian national oil company, contracted the company to conduct seismic survey in Ethiopia in Gambella and Ogaden around 2006. South West Energy, an oil exploration company, also contracted the company to do seismic surveying in Ogaden at around the same time.
