= Kebri Dahar =

City in the Somali Region of Ethiopia

Kebri Dahar ከብሪ ደሃር
- City
- Location within Ethiopia
- Coordinates: 6°44′N 44°16′E
- Country: Ethiopia
- Region: Somali Region
- Zone: Korahey

Government
  - Type: City administration
  - Mayor: Eng Abdirisak Awil
  - City manager: Eng Ahmednour Tayib mohamed

Area
  - Total: 280 km^{2} (109 sq mi)
  - Land: 48.4313 km^{2} (18.6994 sq mi)
- Elevation: 1,609 m (5,279 ft)
- Time zone: UTC+3 (EAT)
- zip code: 3060
- Area code: +251

Kebri Dahar (Amharic: ከብሪደሃር, Somali: Qabridahare) is a city in the eastern Somali Region of Ethiopia. Located in the Korahe Zone, the town has a latitude and longitude of 6°44′N 44°16′E and an elevation of 1609 meters above sea level. Qabridahare is served by Qabridahare International Airport (ICAO code HAKD, IATA: ABK).

== History ==
The earliest mention of Kebri Dehar is in 1931, when it was described as "a soldier's camp" that suffered from malaria; although the settlement was 500 meters above the river, the scrub had not been cleared and provided the mosquitoes sufficient cover to reach their victims. According to Margery Perham, Kebri Dehar was first established as a garrison fort sometime prior to the Italo-Abyssinian War.

A hospital for the town was under construction in 1958 when Emperor Haile Selassie inspected it during a tour of the Ogaden. In 1966 a road was built connecting Kebri Dehar and the new town of Gode. The Ethiopian Road Authority announced a construction project to connect Kebri Dehar with neighbouring towns. One road, to include 113.5 kilometres of paved road and five bridges will connect Kebri Dehar with Shekosh, while a second, which will include the creation of 95 kilometres of paved road and construction of six large and medium bridges, will connect the town to Danan.

During the Ogaden War in 1977, Kebri Dehar was defended by the Ethiopian Ninth Brigade against the Somali Army before abandoning it in disarray after being defeated by the Somali army who captured the town thereafter. It was recaptured by the Ethiopian Third Paracommando Brigade on 8 March 1978.

== Demographics ==
Based on figures from the Central Statistical Agency in 2005, Kebri Dahar has an estimated total population of 100,191 of whom 51,327 are men and 48,864 are women. The 1997 census reported this town had a total population of 24,263 of whom 12,768 were men and 11,495 women. The two largest ethnic groups reported in this town were the Somali (99%), and the (1%); all other ethnic groups made up 0.3% of the population. It is the largest settlement in Kebri Dehar woreda.

== Climate ==
Climate data for Kebri Dahar, elevation 450 m (1,480 ft)
Month	Jan	Feb	Mar	Apr	May	Jun	Jul	Aug	Sep	Oct	Nov	Dec	Year
Mean daily maximum °C (°F)	33.7 (92.7)	35.0 (95.0)	35.4 (95.7)	34.2 (93.6)	32.2 (90.0)	32.0 (89.6)	31.2 (88.2)	31.7 (89.1)	33.0 (91.4)	32.0 (89.6)	32.7 (90.9)	33.5 (92.3)	33.1 (91.5)
Daily mean °C (°F)	26.5 (79.7)	27.7 (81.9)	28.2 (82.8)	28.2 (82.8)	27.0 (80.6)	26.8 (80.2)	26.1 (79.0)	26.1 (79.0)	27.0 (80.6)	26.7 (80.1)	26.1 (79.0)	26.1 (79.0)	26.9 (80.4)
Mean daily minimum °C (°F)	18.7 (65.7)	19.5 (67.1)	21.0 (69.8)	21.7 (71.1)	20.8 (69.4)	20.2 (68.4)	21.0 (69.8)	20.6 (69.1)	21.2 (70.2)	20.7 (69.3)	19.5 (67.1)	18.1 (64.6)	20.2 (68.5)
Average precipitation mm (inches)	2 (0.1)	12 (0.5)	4 (0.2)	149 (5.9)	100 (3.9)	5 (0.2)	0 (0)	0 (0)	15 (0.6)	114 (4.5)	58 (2.3)	8 (0.3)	467 (18.5)
Average relative humidity (%)	53	51	51	59	65	60	62	60	60	66	62	55	59
Source: FAO

== Notable residents ==
- Mohamed Sirad Dolal, leader in the Ogaden National Liberation Front
- Ahmed Madobe, governor of Jubbaland and former Islamic Courts Union official
