= Western Somali Liberation Front =

1973–1989 Somali armed separatist group in Ethiopia

- Jabhadda Xoreynta Somali Galbeed
- Flag of the Western Somali Liberation Front
- Leader: Hassan Mahmoud
- Dates active: 1973–1989
- Active regions: Somali Region
- Ideology: Somali nationalism Islamic nationalism
- Size: 30,000 (1977); 18,000 (1980)
- Wars: Ogaden War

The Western Somali Liberation Front (Somali: Jabhadda Xoreynta Somali Galbeed; abbreviated WSLF) was a Somali nationalist movement that waged an insurgency for the independence of the Somali-inhabited Ogaden from Ethiopia and its unification with Somalia.

Originating from Somali insurgent networks resisting the rule of the Ethiopian Empire in the early 1960s, the WSLF became the principal force behind the armed struggle for self-determination and independence in the Ogaden throughout the 1970s. Though a Somali oriented movement, the organization also included many members of the Harari and Oromo peoples of Ethiopia’s Muslim population who supported the Somali cause.

The WSLF eventually received the backing of the Somali Democratic Republic led by Siad Barre, and played a central role in the 1977–78 Ogaden War, fighting alongside the Somali National Army (SNA) after it had launched a major invasion intended to capitalize on the growing success of the WSLF insurgency. Despite early gains, the war ended in strategic defeat after a massive Soviet and Cuban military intervention on Ethiopia’s behalf.

The WSLF continued its guerrilla operations into the 1980s, but gradually declined due to internal divisions and intensified Ethiopian counterinsurgency campaigns, which were supported by Cuban forces and Somali proxy factions that were aligned with the Ethiopian government. By 1989, it had ceased to exist as an effective guerrilla force. Despite its decline, the WSLF laid the foundation for subsequent Somali insurgent movements in the region, most notably the Ogaden National Liberation Front (ONLF).

== Background ==
After World War II, Somali leaders in the Somali Region persistently advocated for self-determination from the Ethiopian Empire, yet their pleas were consistently disregarded by both imperial authorities and the United Nations. In the post-war period, the British handed over the Ogaden to Emperor Haile Selassie's government. While parts of the region had been nominally under the rule of the Ethiopian Empire since Menelik's expansions in the 1890s, the British also handed over Somali lands east of the city of Jigjiga which had never been administered by the Ethiopian Empire.

In the mid-1950s, Ethiopia for the first time controlled the entire Ogaden and began incorporating it into the empire. In the decades following the British handover, hardly any infrastructure was built in the Somali region by the central government. The Ethiopian presence in the region was always colonial in nature, primarily consisting of soldiers and tax collectors. The Somalis were never treated as equals by the Amhara settlers and were scarcely integrated into the Ethiopian Empire.

=== 1960s uprising ===
During the late 1940s and 1950s, covert Somali organizations in the Somali Region had formed with the aim of freeing the region from Ethiopian rule. During mid-1963, the first major rebellion in the region broke out. Known as 'Nasrallah' or the Ogaden Liberation Front, the organization began with 300 men and soon swelled to 3,000.

Emperor Selassie enlisted the help of both the United States and Israel to suppress Somalis fighting for the Ogaden region's independence. The Ethiopian Imperial Army launched a large scale counterinsurgency campaign during the summer and fall of 1963. The imperial governments reprisals during the counterinsurgency campaign, which consisted large scale artillery bombardments of Somali cities in the Region, resulted in rapidly deteriorating relations between the Ethiopian Empire and the Somali Republic, eventually resulting the 1964 Border War. In the years following, insurgent activity continued but declined over the late 1960s due to pressures from both the Ethiopian and Somali governments. The Nasrallah insurgents formed the foundation of the future Western Somali Liberation Front.

Between 1965 and 1975, Nasrallah began emphasizing on building the political and diplomatic groundwork for another liberation struggle. The organization opened an office in Mogadishu and in sympathetic Arab states such as Iraq and Syria. Somali insurgents remained active in the regions hinterlands until the rebels under the banner of the Western Somali Liberation Front began operations in 1974.

== History ==
=== Formation ===
In 1969 a new liberation organization began forming. The early 1970s saw the Ogaden liberation movement continue to gain momentum off the foundations of Nasrallah, though the original organization had gradually started to disintegrate. In light of this, veteran insurgents and young intelligentsia from the Ogaden region within Siad Barre's government lobbied for Somalia to support the resumption of the armed struggle. Following the toppling of Halie Selassie's imperial regime by the Derg military junta, the situation in the Ogaden deteriorated. In the same period, a severe drought gripped the Ogaden resulting in mass suffering. The Derg opted to suppress news of the situation in the region rather than provide relief, and under the junta military oppression in the region increased. As 1974 and 1975 drew on, pressure from Ogaden Somalis rapidly built on the government of Siad Barre. By 1975, the Somali government had been convinced to aid the movement. Significant reorganizations were made in this period, including the decision to choose a new name. There was a sharp debate over whether to name the organization the 'Ogaden' or 'Western Somali' liberation front, with the latter eventually prevailing as the choice. The Ethiopian government claimed the Palestinian Liberation Organization (PLO) was training the Somali guerrillas.

In January 1976, a general conference of Western Somali society was held 100 km north-west of Mogadishu. A twenty-five-member committee was elected to lead the WSLF, and Abdullahi Hassan Mahmoud became its first leader when the organization was formerly founded at the conference. That same year, training camps were soon formed across the Ogaden and Somalia. WSLF launched the Western Somali Youth Organization which became the adolescent faction of the WSLF. The youth divisions president was Mohamoud Dirir Gheddi. WSLF's youth organization would build academies for minors in the region.

Despite the organizations clear emphasis on Somalis, the WSLF found support among Muslim Harari and Oromo populations. Many Hararis joined the organization, with several such as Colonel Ezedin Yusuf in leading positions during the armed struggle. According to WSLF accounts, a large number of the fronts younger guerrillas were Harari "boys and girls", which was named the Imam Ahmed squad after the sixteenth century Muslim leader Ahmad ibn Ibrahim al-Ghazi. Ioan Lewis noted that Muslim Oromo support was significant to the WSLF, and extended into the command structure of the organization.

According to Dan Connell, the WSLF adopted an ideology of "Islamic nationalism".

=== Initiation of WSLF insurgency (1974–1976) ===
During the last years of the Emperor Haile Selassie's rule the WSLF started becoming active in the south. The WSLF found its opportunity when the Derg overthrew Haile Selassie in 1974 and switched from American support to the Soviet Union. The initiation of full-scale guerrilla warfare occurred almost simultaneously in the northern and southern regions in the early months of 1976. By the year's end, it had expanded across southeastern Bale and Sidamo. The terrain, comprising partly arid scrubland and mountainous and wooded areas, was familiar to the fighters, and the local inhabitants were considered friendly. Infiltrating from various points in the Somali republic, the guerrillas moved rapidly across the rugged hills. Wherever they went, they dismantled the state presence by destroying government offices and systematically targeting police and civilian administration. In total there were fourth Brigades or in Somali "Afar Gaas" within the WSLF movement. At the start of 1977, the WSLF began escalating it attacks against Ethiopian troops. First Brigade was known as "Duufaan". Second Brigade was known as "Ahmed Gurey" and was the largest Brigade of the WSLF. Third Brigade was known as "Horyaal" and the Fourth Brigade was known as "Ciil Tire". Each brigade was assigned to enter different front in the Somali Region of Ethiopia.

In 1976, the Somali government set up a counterpart of WSLF to fight in the Oromo areas, calling it the Somali Abo Liberation Front (SALF), whose sphere of operations was in the provinces of Bale, Sidamo, and Arsi, where it advocated union with Somalia or the creation of an independent state. Wako Gutu and Shekih Hussein were some of the prominent Oromo nationalists who joined SALF, which soon surpassed the Oromo Liberation Army (OLF). Somalia equipped both groups with Soviet arms, and in early 1977 sent 3,000 soldiers from the Somali Army to fight as guerrillas with the WSLF.

=== Escalation (1976–1977) ===
During early 1977, with the exception of towns strategically positioned on vital routes and intersections, the WSLF effectively controlled most of the Ogaden lowlands. The rebels employed hit-and-run tactics, targeting the Ethiopian army at its vulnerable points and then blending into a predominantly supportive or sympathetic local population. These tactics eroded the morale of the Ethiopian troops, compelling them to retreat to bunkers and camps. The Ethiopian army found itself confined to garrison towns, many of which were besieged. While any attempt to storm these garrison towns invited devastating firepower from the Ethiopian defenders, travel between towns became perilous. Military and civilian vehicles required armed escorts, often falling into ambushes or encountering land mines. On February 11, 1977, a notable ambush occurred near Horakelifo (between Degehabur and Jijiga), resulting in the death of 25 soldiers and officers, with another 24 wounded, and the destruction of armored cars and trucks. Around the same time, a police contingent was annihilated not far from Filtu. These disruptions to supply lines led to frequent transportation delays to the camps. In addition to affecting the morale of the troops, guerrilla actions aimed at sabotaging the economy also occurred. In the summer of 1977, WSLF fighters destroyed several important installations, and on June 1, they detonated the railway connecting the Ethiopian capital to the port of Djibouti. This crucial economic lifeline, normally handling 70 percent of Ethiopia's exports and 50 percent of her imports, remained out of commission until August.

Initially composed of an active force of roughly 5,000 guerrillas, the WSLF was not able to seize control of any major towns or important outposts controlled by the Ethiopian military during early stages of the insurgency.

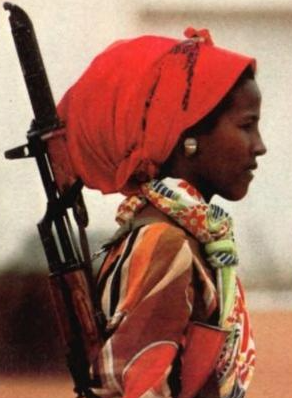
A Somali woman fighting for the WSLF (1977)

June 1977 saw the WSLF step up its campaign. The three major towns of the Ogaden: Jigjiga, Dire Dawa and Harar all came under repeated insurgent attack. Transportation routes between the towns were constantly harassed and vital bridges were destroyed. In order to protect the Djibouti-Addis railway the Derg deployed thousands of paratroopers on the vital rail lines connecting Ethiopia to the sea. Despite this effort the WSLF successfully cut the rail line. That month, the WSLF had been successful in forcing the Ethiopian army out of much of the Ogaden and into the strongholds of Harar, Dire Dawa and Jigjiga. Siad Barre decided to intensify the war by involving the Somali army as he believed it would allow the WSLF to press home their growing victories and enable the complete secession of the Ogaden. On June 13, 1977, approximately 5,000 SNA soldiers crossed the border, launching a coordinated attack on specific targets in the Ogaden. The soldiers had taken off their uniform insignia and disguised themselves as guerrillas for the operation. Under the command of SNA officers, the WSLF engaged in attacks on Ethiopian military positions, pounding Gode, Degehabur and Kebri Dahar with mortars and rockets. However, the offensive was repulsed with heavy casualties. At Gode alone, 300 WSLF guerrillas and 14 high ranking SNA officers were killed. Dissent among the army, especially among the Ogaden clan, became vocal. After this disastrous offensive, the decision was made to invade Ethiopia to support the WSLF.

=== Ogaden War (1977–1978) ===
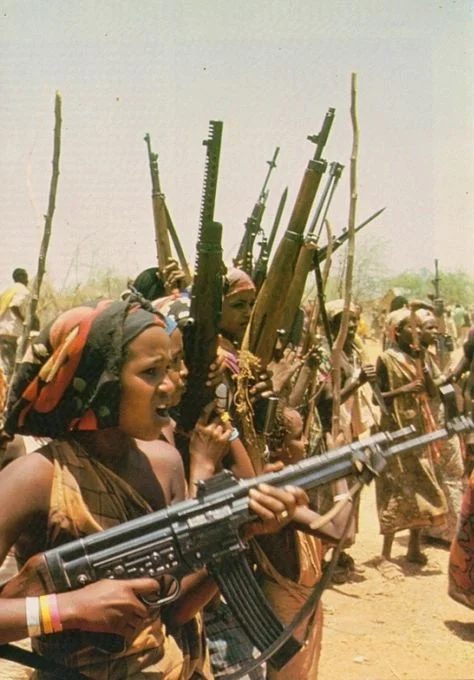
WSLF fighters in the beginning of the war.

On July 13, 1977, the Somali National Army (SNA) invaded Ethiopia to assist the WSLF. The Somali government refused to declare war, instead insisting that in the media that all the military actions were taken by the WSLF. The WSLF engaged in sabotage actions, impairing the mobility of the Ethiopian army. By September 1977, the SNA/WSLF had overrun 90% of the Ogaden. Bolstered by the arrival of the SNA, which was primarily composed of armored and motorized units, the WSLF went on to capture Jigjiga in September 1977. The 2nd Brigade, Ahmed Gurey was the main strength of the WSLF during the war, they captured Jigjiga after 4 weeks of heavy fighting with the Ethiopia army. Former Somali President Abdullahi Yusuf Ahmed said "the WSLF brigades were very strong and united against all odds" during his interview with former BBC World Service report Abdisalan Harari. This was claim backed by an interview with former Cuban leader Fidel Castro. By the November and the onset of the rainy season, the WSLF was poised to capture the city of Harar. However, in early 1978 the Ethiopian government acquired a new arsenal of Soviet equipment and, spearheaded by Cuban combat troops, managed to push back the SNA/WSLF forces.

According to British journalist and military historian Mark Urban, "Under the leadership of Hassan Mahmoud, the WSLF had waged a spectacular campaign, but unlike the Eritreans, they failed to grasp the importance of publicizing their struggle abroad." Urban observes that had the WSLF pursued this more seriously, it may have been able to acquire some of the vital weaponry required to defend themselves from airstrikes.

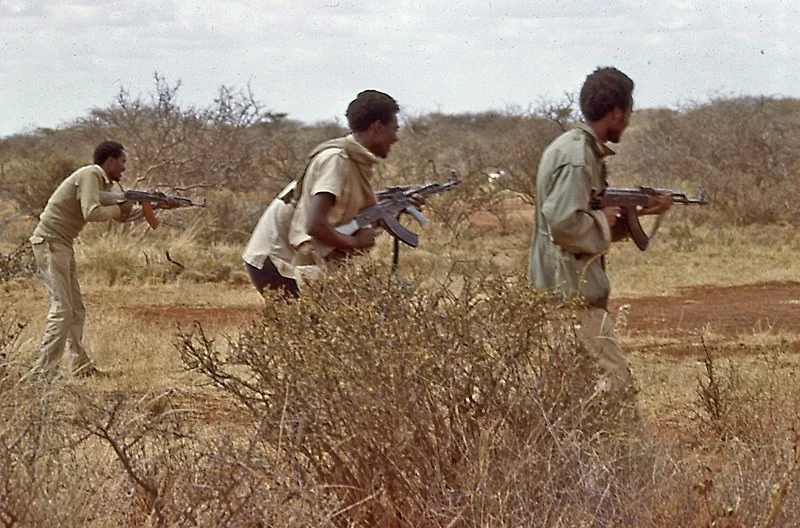
WSLF in fight against Ethiopian forces.

After the Ogaden War, the Ethiopian army only remained in full control of the Ogaden for a very brief period of time. During a conference on 11 March 1978, WSLF head Abdullahi Mahmoud Hassan declared that despite the withdrawal of the Somali army forces deployed to support it, the front would continue its liberation struggle.

=== Post Ogaden War insurgency (1978-1984) ===
During June 1978, the WSLF had a major success when it reclaimed the town of Gode, killing 300 Ethiopian and Cuban troops while disabling the only viable air base in the area. During the summer of 1978, the WSLF was back in control of most of the Ogaden countryside, and the Ethiopian army was confined to the towns and the roads. Sweeps and patrols in 1979 managed to reduce rebel activity but failed to clear out the insurgents. By the end of the 70s, the WSLF was estimated to have an army of 18,000 men, thus becoming the second largest rebel group in Ethiopia, the first being the Eritrean People's Liberation Front (EPLF).

The Ethiopians began using the newly formed Somali Salvation Democratic Front (SSDF) to help hunt down WSLF fighters. The SSDF possessed little autonomy over Ethiopian security forces, as it was 'created, organized, trained and financed by Ethiopia'. A Central Intelligence Agency report on Somali exile activity published in early 1979 observed that SSDF rebels performed poorly against WSLF fighters in battle. It was observed that the WSLF had the backing of the vast majority of the Somalis population and that SSDF's willingness to fight the group adversely impacted its attempts to garner public support. During 1979, the Isaaq wing of the WSLF, Afraad, came into conflict with the main Ogaden clan forces of the WSLF following an incident where a WSLF fighter had committed rape which had then escalated into murder and further violence.

==== Ethiopian counter-insurgency campaigns ====
In the early 1980s, the Ethiopian government transformed the Ogaden into a vast military zone, carrying out indiscriminate aerial bombardments and forced resettlement programs. Foreign correspondents visiting the region during this time observed a stark 'dual society,' with Somali inhabitants identifying strongly as 'Western Somalis.' The Derg regime also engineered artificial droughts and famines to weaken Somali resistance to Ethiopian rule in the Ogaden. As the WSLF faced large scale Ethiopian and Cuban army assaults following the war, they were left with only small arms and mortars to combat helicopter gunships and armored vehicles operating in open terrain. The Ethiopian government initiated a policy of depopulating and resettling Somalis to weaken the WSLF's social base. Simultaneously, they introduced thousands of Amhara, Tigrayan, and Oromo settlers to strengthen Ethiopian control over the region.

In August 1980, the Derg regime launched a massive anti-insurgency campaign known as "Operation Lash" to clear the Ogaden of insurgents. The Ethiopian army deployed six divisions consisting of 60,000 men under the command of Merid Negussie. After stationing troops around the border of Somalia to block suspected entry and exit points, the Ethiopian forces moved in, dispersing, encircling and liquidating the rebels. The SALF disintegrated, whereas the WSLF managed to escape to northern Somalia. Ethiopian historian Gebru Tareke claimed that by December 1980, the Ogaden was cleared of insurgents. During these operations the Ethiopians used the SSDF rebels to attack WSLF camps within Somalia.

In 1981, fighting between the WSLF and Ethiopian army continued. In the environs of Harar and Jigjiga the WSLF engaged in fierce battles with the Ethiopian army. Fighting also took place around Kebri Dahar and WSLF claimed that it had severed the major roads linking towns. The Mengistu regime also began to support the Somali National Movement (SNM) alongside SSDF to fight the WSLF. The resulting war between the SNM and the WSLF was an important element in Ethiopian strategy, to exploit the clan divisions within Somali society and give the WSLF the final blow. From 1982 to 1984, the Somali National Movement (SNM) with support from the Ethiopian army, engaged in intense clashes with the WSLF in northwestern Somalia. In December 1984 the SNM launched an offensive that forced the WSLF out of its rear bases in northern Somalia.

=== Decline, formation of ONLF and cessation of operations (1984-1989) ===
In the years following the Ogaden War, many supporters of the WSLF became disillusioned with the organizations increasing reliance on Mogadishu and were frustrated by international portrayals of the struggle in the Ogaden as merely a border matter between Ethiopia and Somalia. A group of the WSLF's youth faction would go on to form the Ogaden National Liberation Front (ONLF) in 1984. The new organization was immediately banned by the government of Siad Barre.

Throughout the rest of the 1980s the WSLF was mired in a stalemate and unable to expand operations, largely due to hostile Somali rebel groups who served as proxy forces for Addis Ababa. An April 1988 agreement between Ethiopia and Somalia would result in the end of the organization's operations, as the Somali government withdrew support and restricted it. President Siad Barre had renounced claims on Western Somalia (Ogaden), telling the WSLF leadership that Somalia's security was at stake and forbidding them from engaging in activity that might anger Addis Ababa. The 1988 agreement with Mengistu intensified domestic opposition to Barre in Somalia, especially within the Ogaden clan. The WSLF, ONLF and other liberation organizations condemned the new foreign policy adopted by Mogadishu. By 1989, the WSLF had ceased to be an effective guerrilla force in Ethiopia.

In the early 1990s, there were still several hundred people who identified themselves as the WSLF. As the organization faded, it was replaced in the Somali Region by the Ogaden National Liberation Front and Al-Itihaad Al-Islamiya who continued the struggle for independence from Ethiopia.

== See also ==
- Ogaden National Liberation Front
- Tigray Peoples Liberation Front
- Oromo Liberation Front
- Issa and Gurgura Liberation Front

== Bibliography ==
- Abdi, Mohamed Mohamud (2021). A History of the Ogaden (Western Somali) Struggle for Self-Determination: Part I (1300–2007) (2nd ed.). UK: Safis Publishing. ISBN 978-1-906342-39-5. OCLC 165059930.
