= Ogaden National Liberation Front =

Social and political movement in Ogaden, Ethiopia

Ogaden National Liberation Front الجبهة الوطنية لتحرير أوجادين Jabhadda Waddaniga Xoreynta Ogaadeeniya
- Abbreviation: ONLF, JWXO
- Leader: Sheikh Ibrahim Abdalla Mohamed ''MAH" (1991–1998); Mohammed Omar Osman (1998–2018); Abdirahman Mahdi (since 2018)
- Founded: 15 August 1984; 42 years ago
- Split from: Western Somali Liberation Front
- Ideology: Somali nationalism
- Political position: Centre-left
- Colors: Green, Blue, Red

Party flag

Website
- http://onlf.org/

The Ogaden National Liberation Front (ONLF; Somali: Jabhadda Waddaniga Xoreynta Ogaadeeniya, JWXO; Arabic: الجبهة الوطنية لتحرير أوجادين, romanized: Al-Jabhat al-wataniat litahrir 'Awjadin) is a Somali nationalist armed and political organization seeking self-determination for the Somali-inhabited Ogaden.

Founded in 1984 by former members of the Western Somali Liberation Front (WSLF), the ONLF initially pursued political autonomy through Ethiopia's federal system after the collapse of the Derg regime during 1991. It won a regional majority in 1992, but growing disillusionment with the federal arrangement, political exclusion, and repression by the central government led the ONLF to launch an armed insurgency in 1994. Over the following decades, the group waged a sustained guerrilla campaign across the Somali Region, targeting Ethiopian National Defense Force (ENDF) positions and resource extraction projects by the central government that it viewed as exploitative.

In 2018, the group signed a peace agreement with the new Ethiopian government led by Abiy Ahmed and transitioned into a legal political party, though tensions have resurfaced during 2025 amid claims of unfulfilled promises and repression in the Somali Region. During January 2026 the ONLF announced the formation of the Somali People’s Alliance for Self-Determination (SPAS). The alliance stated its creation was to unify the "Somali political agency" and end the "era of futile negotiation" with the Ethiopian government, which they accuse of repression and policies threatening Somali livelihoods.

== History ==
The Somali struggle for self-determination in the Ogaden has been ongoing since Ethiopian Emperor Menelik II's invasions during the late 1880s. During early 1900, the anti-colonial Somali Dervish movement fought against the expansion of the Ethiopian Empire. The first organized post-Somali independence resistance began with Nasrallah during the 1963-1965 rebellion. Nasrallah served as the foundation of the Western Somali Liberation Front (WSLF) which was formed in the early 1970s.

=== Founding and formation ===
Following the 1977-1978 Ogaden War, many supporters of the Western Somali Liberation Front became disillusioned with the organizations increasing reliance on Mogadishu and were frustrated by international portrayals of the struggle in the Ogaden as merely a border matter between Ethiopia and Somalia. The ONLF was founded in 1984 by six disaffected members of the WSLF: Abdirahman Mahdi, Mohamed Ismail Omar, Sheikh Ibrahim Abdallah Mohamed, Abdi Ibrahim Ghehleh, Abdirahman Yusuf Magan and Abdulahi Muhammed Sa'adi. The organization was immediately banned by the government of Siad Barre. The ONLF leadership viewed their struggle as an Arab-Islamic cause and described the Ogaden as "one of the last occupied Arab territories in the 21st century."

In 1988, the Barre and Mengistu regimes came to an accord not to support insurgencies in each others territories. The WSLF, ONLF, and other liberation groups issued public declarations condemning the Somali governments new stance on the Ogaden. After putting significant pressure against the WSLF, the Somali government effectively dismantled it that same year. To the ONLF and many Somalis in the region, the agreement confirmed that the Somali government was no longer sincere about the liberation struggle. Consequently, the 1988 accord improved the organizations prospects for mobilization. As the Somali state collapsed at the end of 1990, the US government had resolved to avoid a similar fate in Ethiopia post-Mengistu. On 27 May 1991, the US invited the Ethiopian People's Revolutionary Democratic Front (EPRDF), Eritrean Peoples Liberation Front (EPLF) and Oromo Liberation Front (OLF) to talks in London. The ONLF requested to participate, but was turned down by the US.

=== 1992 conference and election victory ===
==== Garigo'an conference ====
From 1984 to 1992, the organization lacked effective formal structures of its own, and was instead represented by different Ogaden groups under the ONLF banner that supported the groups ideals. On 17 January 1992, at Garigo'an near Garbo, a central committee led by Sheikh Ibrahim Abdallah was elected. This would lay the foundation for an organized and cohesive organization.

To take part in the upcoming 1992 regional elections the two existing Somali political entities in the Ogaden, the ONLF and Al-Itihaad Al-Islamiya (AIAI), organized themselves into different constituencies across the Ogaden. Later that year the Ethiopian government forces attacked AIAI's headquarters in the region killing several high ranking figures. Following the attack, Al-Itihaad quickly regrouped and declared a jihad against the Ethiopian military presence in the region. As fighting between AIAI and the Ethiopian military raged throughout 1992, a serious internal debate and two factions emerged within the ONLF over whether to join the war. One wing argued that it was clear that the new Ethiopian government was not serious about self-rule and democracy, so the armed struggle should be resumed. The opposing side argued that the government should still be given a chance considering the upcoming regional elections slated for December 1992. It was also noted that the organization only possessed a small military wing. Eventually the argument to refrain from joining the war and struggle through democratic means prevailed, and the government's war against AIAI ended in a ceasefire soon before the elections.

==== December elections and participation in government ====
By the time Mengistu regime fell, the ONLF had significantly consolidated its position among ethnic Somalis in Ogaden, and joined the Transitional Government. The ONLF announced elections in December 1992 for District Five (what became the Somali Region) in Ethiopia, and won 80% of the seats of the local parliament. Though the war between Al-Itihaad and the government had ended before the election, AIAI did not participate. ONLF nominated Abdullahi Muhumed Sa'di for the Region's presidency, and other members for the vice-presidency and the Executive body; the regional parliament elected them in a majority vote. ONLF elected officials ruled the territory until the transitional government ended with the adoption of a new constitution. At that time the ruling Ethiopian People's Revolutionary Democratic Front pushed for a new partner in the region, which led to the founding of the Ethiopian Somali Democratic League (ESDL) at Hurso in 1993.

=== Rise of ONLF insurgency ===
==== Tensions and fallout with EPRDF ====
Since 1992, the Tigray Peoples Liberation Front (TPLF) dominated EPRDF sought to curb Somali demands for self-determination by influencing politics in the region. To this end the central government portrayed the ESDL as a pan-Somali organization in contrast to the Ogaden clan dominated ONLF. While many Somalis saw the ESDL as a merely an extension of the Ethiopian government, the strategy put the ONLF under greater pressure. Despite an agreement between the central government and the ONLF to cooperate on security and administration in the lead up to the 1992 elections, a mutual suspicion existed. Following the 1992 attack on Al-Itihaad, mistrust of the EPRDF within the ONLF greatly deepened. The 1995 general elections were boycotted by the majority of the ONLF, Al-Itihaad and large segments of the Ogaden population due to governments heavy handed interference in the political process. Some ONLF members who opposed the boycott participated in the elections, and performed poorly. Major discontent was provoked by the EPRDF led government after it had moved the state capital from Gode to Jigjiga in 1994. Following the boycott, the government went so far as to form another organization called 'New ONLF'. The 'New ONLF' and ESDL won the 1995 elections and then merged into the Somali People's Democratic Party (SPDP).

==== Rebellion ====
In 1994, fighting between Ethiopian forces and the ONLF began at Werder, resulting in several days of clashes. Post-1995, armed conflict in the Ogaden sharply increased. During military confrontations between the ONLF and the military, government forces enacted brutal measures that included summary executions, extensive detentions without prosecution, disappearances and torture in a bid to crush the insurgency. In response to heavy handed measures, the ONLF began reaching out to the Oromo Liberation Front (OLF) and the Afar Revolutionary Democratic Unity Front (ARDUF). Agreements to coordinate activities with both groups were signed. In response to this development, the EPRDF intensified operations and began labelling these groups 'terrorists'. In a bid to gain control of the region, different Somali leaders were imprisoned or assassinated by the central government.

Despite an intensive government military campaign against the ONLF from 1994 to 1996, the organization survived and grew in strength. While the ONLF was effectively composed of numerous differing groups, the governments political interference and brutal counterinsurgency measures led many Somalis in the Ogaden to rally behind it. Previous internal fractures within the organization greatly dissipated in this period, resulting in the ONLF becoming a more cohesive force than it had ever previously been. Until the late 1990s the ONLF was diplomatically isolated, with no ties to outside groups. While the organization had proved to be an effective military force, its armed wing was relatively small for the organizations size and was severely underequipped. In 1998, the organization held its second conference where a new leader, Admiral Mohamed Omar Osman, was elected. His tenure would see the ONLF's military wing greatly expand in strength over the following years. Significantly he also brought the organization out of diplomatic isolation by forging connections regionally and internationally.

As the Eritrean–Ethiopian War was ongoing, the ONLF opened offices in Eritrea during 1999. Eritrea backed the ONLF until the peace deal hosted by Eritrea in Asmara ended the insurgency in 2018.

=== 2000s insurgency ===
In 2001, ONLF training camps were operational in Eritrea and by 2002 training began for the first contingent of ONLF female fighters. Over the early 2000's the ONLF's military capabilities expanded and the organization began stepping up attacks against Ethiopian military positions in the Ogaden, with a significant escalation in armed conflict occurring during 2005. The Ethiopian government took advantage of the war on terror to routinely label opposition movements terrorists, and accused the ONLF of being associated with and linked to Al-Qaeda.

On 21 May 2006 the ONLF entered into an alliance with five different Ethiopian opposition groups in an effort to strengthen the resistance to the TPLF dominated central government. Included were the Ethiopian People's Patriotic Front, the Oromo Liberation Front, and the Sidama Liberation Front.

Between February and July 2006, the ENDF tried to destroy the ONLF in various operations but failed. The approximately 5,000 to 7,000 ONLF troops faced an Ethiopian army garrison of around 15,000. This permanent garrison was reinforced with a further 25,000 troops during 2006.

==== Ethiopian invasion of Somalia and escalation of Ogaden insurgency ====
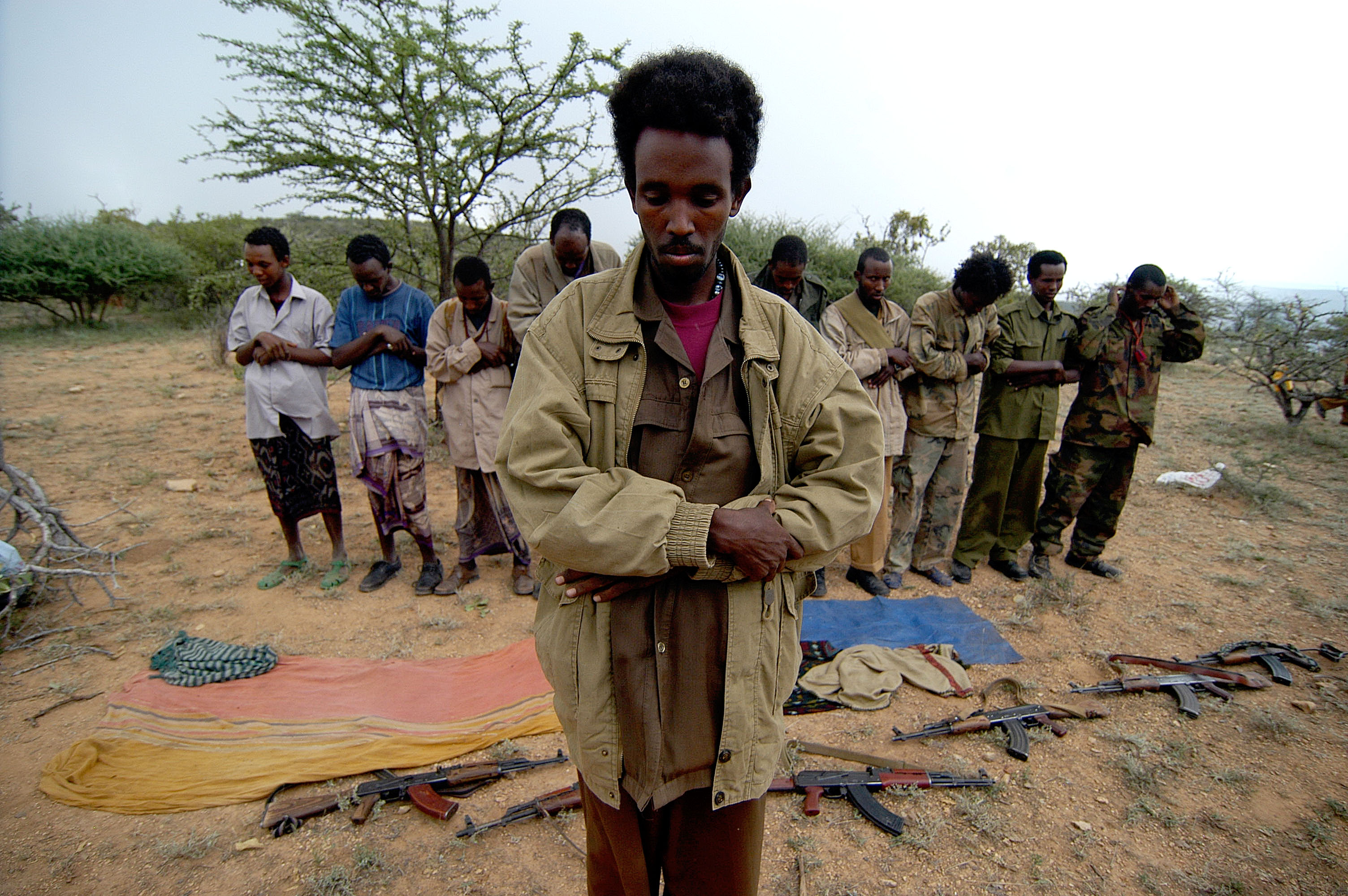
ONLF rebels practicing salat, Muslim daily prayers

Direct links between the ONLF and Islamic organizations within Somalia, in particular Al-Itihaad Al-Islamiya, long predates the events of the mid-2000s. The ONLF had a covert relationship with and was supported by the Islamic Courts Union (ICU) which had risen to power in Somalia during 2006. The ICU was seen as a 'natural ally'. The Ogaden/Somali Region was at the heart of the dispute between the ICU and the Ethiopian government. A high ranking ICU official had declared following their rise to power that, "The land taken by Ethiopia cannot be forgotten because it is attached to our blood...Ethiopia mistreats the Somalis under their administration."

On 23 July 2006, the ONLF announced the downing of an Ethiopian military helicopter heading for Somalia and publicly warned that ENDF movements in the region pointed towards an imminent large scale operation. The Ethiopian military campaign against the ONLF, along with widespread atrocities committed against civilians associated with it, drove hundreds of men (thousands according to some estimates) from the Ogaden to Mogadishu in order to answer the ICU's call to arms against the Ethiopian invasion. On 12 August 2006, the Ethiopian government claimed 13 members of the ONLF were killed and several commanders captured as they crossed into Ethiopia from Somalia. In a 26 November 2006 press release, the organization rejected government claims of an ONLF military presence in Somalia, and further warned that it would not allow Ethiopian troops to stage into Somalia from their territories:

...the ONLF categorically denies assertions by the TPLF led regime in Ethiopia and members of the media that ONLF military personnel are in Somalia. As a matter of principle the ONLF has never been and does not intend to be a party to the conflict in Somalia. We wish to affirm that the scope of our military operations is and will continue to be limited to Ogaden and Ethiopia. We further wish to make clear that the Ogaden cause in not a territorial dispute between Somalia and Ethiopia but rather a legitimate struggle for the self-determination of the Somali people of Ogaden...the ONLF wishes to affirm that we will not allow our territory to be used as a launching pad for an Ethiopian invasion of Somalia without stiff resistance from our armed forces.

On December 23, the ONLF reported attacking Ethiopian military column that was heading to Somalia, destroying several vehicles and driving the convoy back. The collapse of the Islamic Courts Union government was viewed as a significant blow to the ONLF's ambitions for independence. At the start of 2007, the group publicly condemned the Ethiopian invasion of Somalia, stating that Meles Zenawi's invasion demonstrated that his government had been an active participant in the Somali conflict with a clear agenda aimed at undermining the Somali sovereignty. ONLF forces started escalating their attacks on Ethiopian military forces during early 2007 in reaction to the invasion.

According ONLF leader Mohammed Omar Osman, the territories of Puntland and Somaliland were considered a "big problem" as they actively aided the Ethiopians against the organization. Puntland security services arrested members of the ONLF central committee in Garowe, while Somaliland security forces raided ONLF arms caches in Burao. The ONLF reported that Puntland had turned over several of its leading members to Ethiopian security forces.

During 2007, the ascendant Al-Shabaab came into conflict with the ONLF and fighting erupted between the two groups. Relations worsened between the two groups in the ensuing years.

=== 2007 Ogaden conflict ===
On January 15, ONLF rebels attacked Ethiopian soldiers in Kebri Dahar, Gerbo, and Fiq. Five Ethiopian soldiers and one ONLF rebel were reported killed.

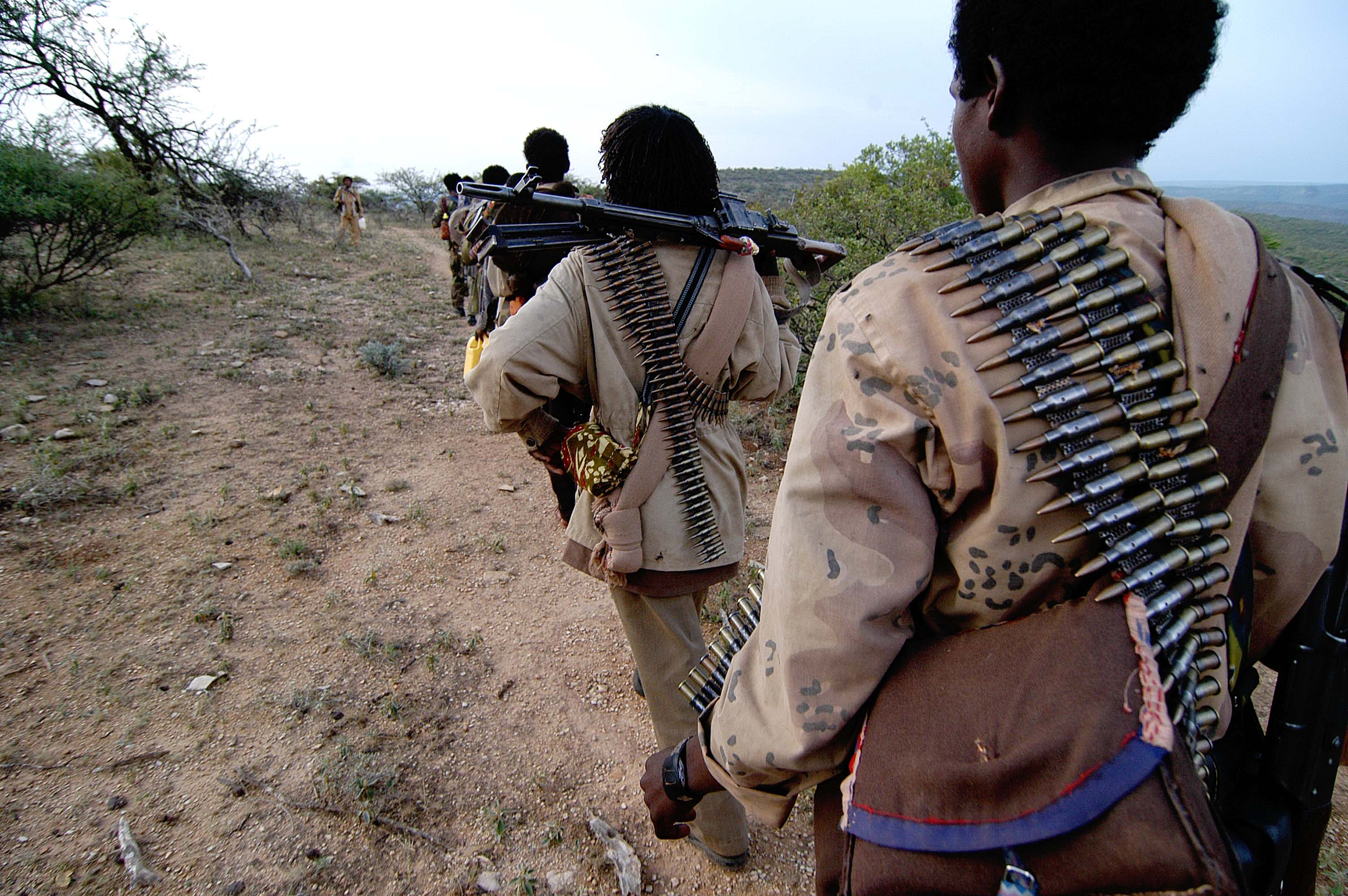
Column of ONLF rebels

==== Raid on Abole oil exploration facility ====
On April 24, 2007, members of the ONLF attacked a camp for employees of Zhongyuan Petroleum Engineering, a Chinese oil exploration company contracted on behalf of the Malaysian oil & gas giant Petronas in Abole (Obale), Somali Region, killing approximately 65 Ethiopians and 9 Chinese nationals. The ONLF claimed it had "completely destroyed" the camp. Most of the Ethiopians killed in the attack were daily laborers, guards and other support staff. Some members of the Ethiopian security officials were also killed during the surprise attack however those killed by the ONLF included 30 civilians, the ONLF attack was perpetuated as the ONLF has a policy of not allowing the Ethiopian government to extract resources as this will not be shared with the impoverished and suppressed population of the Ogaden, the Ogaden is largely a marginalized region as rebels have battled successive governments claiming discrimination and most recently crimes against humanity this was backed by a human rights watch report into alleged abuses. It was the most deadly single attack by the ONLF.

==== Spring 2007 crackdown and insurgency ====
Shortly after the attack, the Ethiopian Army launched a military crackdown in Ogaden with the help of Liyu Police. The latest action of this crackdown resulted in the death of foreign relations chief Dr. Mohamed Sirad Dolal at the town of Danan as he met with other ONLF members. Reportedly this has led to the ONLF splitting into two factions, with one group allied to current ONLF chairman Mohammed Omar Osman, and the other led by senior leader Abdiwali Hussein Gas, who appointed Salahudin Ma'ow as the new ONLF chairman and declared that he will "bring Mohammed Omar Osman to court".

In April 2007, the Ethiopian government imposed a total commercial trade embargo on the war-affected area of the Somali Region (the Fiq, Degehabur, Gode, Korahe, and Werder Zones, where the Ogadeni Somali live), prohibiting all commercial truck movement in the region and across the border into Somalia, as well as the free movement of livestock by foot. A tightly restricted and monitor tour by western journalist in the embattled region on the invitation of the regional administration reported on more alleged crimes by the Ethiopian government. A report by a Newsweek reporter detailed how Ethiopian military troops stormed a village southeast of Degahabur, accused the villagers of sympathizing with the ONLF, then razing the village and torturing and murdering many of the inhabitants.

The ONLF, which had declared solidarity with the insurgency against Ethiopian troops in Somalia, engaged in repeated skirmishes with the ENDF as the conflict escalated on both sides of the border. During 2008, the Ethiopian government did not have effective control of much of the Ogaden. Addis Ababa began calling on the Puntland and Somaliland regions to assist it in dismantling ONLF networks within Somalia. Puntland security services arrested members of the ONLF central committee in Garowe, while Somaliland security forces raided ONLF arms caches in Burao. The ONLF reported that Puntland had turned over several of its leading members to Ethiopian security forces.

In a communique, the ONLF claimed to have captured seven towns in the Somali Region on 10 November 2009 after two days of heavy fighting. The ONLF reported these towns as: Obolka, near Harar; Hamaro, east of Fiq; Higlaaley and Gunogabo near Degehabur; Yucub, 40 kilometers from Werder; Galadiid, 35 kilometers from Kebri Dahar; and Boodhaano near Gode. Bereket Simon denied to Reuters that the ONLF had succeeded in capturing any towns, adding, "Their attacks last week were simply the desperate act of a dying force and about 245 of their fighters were killed."

In December 2009, Al-Shabaab claimed it had clashed with the ONLF.

=== 2010s ===
The ONLF continues to operate in the Ogaden as of 2011. The Ethiopian military has stepped up its actions against ONLF following the organizations stated that it would attack the Malaysian oil company Petronas, which plans to extract oil from the Ogaden Basin.

In 2018, the Ethiopian government launched a number of reforms, part of which were removing the ONLF from its list of banned movements and offering the rebels more attractive peace deals. The ONLF declared a ceasefire in August and signed an official peace deal in October, promising to disarm and transform into a political party.

=== 2020s ===
In the 2020s, the ONLF had two major factions, with one based in Jijiga, led by Abdikarin Sheikh Muse Qalbidhagax, with the status as an officially registered political party, and another based outside of Somali Region, led by Abdirahman Mohamed Sheikh Mahdi, which opposed regional and federal government policies.

== War crime allegations ==
During fighting between the ENDF and ONLF both sides were accused of war crimes and human rights violations. In their 2008 report 'Collective Punishment' Human Rights Watch made a catalogue of war crimes and crimes against humanity by the Ethiopian government in its fight against the ONLF. According to the Chicago Tribune, "As of 2007, human rights groups and media reports accuse Ethiopia – a key partner in Washington's battle against terrorism in the volatile Horn of Africa – of burning villages, pushing nomads off their lands and choking off food supplies in a harsh new campaign of collective punishment against a restive ethnic Somali population in the Ogaden, a vast wilderness of rocks and thorns bordering chaotic Somalia". The Ethiopian governments regional security chief for the Ogaden region, Abdi Mohammed Omar, asserted that over a two month period, some 200 civilians had been killed by the ONLF. In May 2007, a grenade attack by ONLF rebels in the Somali region of Ethiopia claimed the lives of at least 11 Somalis. During a national holiday ceremony held at the Ogaden town of Jijiga, the grenade thrown at the podium of the stadium also wounded Somali regional president Abdulahi Hassan Mohammed in the leg. Bereket Simon, an adviser to Prime Minister Meles, blamed the ONLF as well as Eritrea since it arms the ONLF. However, the ONLF denied the accusations. An ONLF grenade attack on a cultural gathering in Jijiga killed four middle school students on May 28, 2007. In a separate attack, fifty civilians were injured, including the regional president Abdullahi Hassan, and three artists were killed on May 28, 2007 by the ONLF. An ONLF attack on the town of the Debeweyin woreda in the Korahe Zone also left ten civilians dead, including two schoolteachers and a pregnant woman. A second attack on the town of Shilavo left five civilians dead, while an ONLF-planted landmine near Aware in the Degehabur Zone exploded, killing three civilians traveling by automobile. Another ONLF unit struck in the district of Lahelow near the Ethiopia-Somalia border, reportedly targeting members of the Isma'il Gum'adle sub-clan, twelve of whom were slain.

== Composition ==
The ONLF is composed mainly of members of the somali Ogaden clan. The armed wing of the ONLF was the Ogaden National Liberation Army (ONLA). Supporters of the ONLF generally aspire to create an independent, sovereign Somali-majority state consisting primarily of what is now Ethiopia's Somali Region. ONLF supporters generally refer to the entire area of this future state as Ogaden or Ogadenia even though the name is controversial among some groups because of its clan-affiliation. The ONLF ostensibly exists to allow the inhabitants of Ethiopia's Somali Region the ability to freely determine their own future and has thus taken few public positions with regards to how a future state of Ogadenia would be administered. That said, the ONLF has fostered the creation of a national consciousness among Ethiopia's Somali inhabitants by adopting a national flag for Ogadenia and promoting an Ogaden national anthem, Qaran (before the adoption of Qaran, the Ogaden national anthem used by some separatists was Abab). Furthermore, the ONLF has an official political programme in which it commits to, among other things, protecting freedom of religion, democratic activity, and the women, children, and minorities of Ogaden.

=== Ogadenia confusion ===
The ONLF mostly recruits from the Ogaden (clan) of Somali people, which constitutes roughly 2/3 of the regional population. However, many other Somali clans and sub-clans reside in the area, and animosity between the pro-ONLF Ogadenis and other Somali clans in the area remains very deeply rooted. For many, calling the region "Ogaden" is "rightly or wrongly, associated with majority rule by the Ogaden clans, respectively with their claim for power within the Somali Regional State". The Ethiopian government has exploited these rivalries by arming minority Somali militias to fight the majority ONLF. Yet, some Ogaden members have pushed for other Somali clans getting represented in the regional government. Writer Mohamed Mohamud Abdi argues that the territory has been under occupation since the Scramble for Africa, and that the inhabitants have been unable to choose their own name Ogadenia for the land.

== Ceasefire and peacemaking efforts ==
The ONLF declared a unilateral ceasefire on 12 August 2018. Despite the ceasefire holding years later and the ONLF being a legally recognized party, in September 2024 Ethiopian military chief Field Marshall Birhanu Jula accused the front of being an 'enemy of the state' which had been allegedly created by Egypt. During October 2024, the ONLF announced it is reassessing the 2018 agreement, citing a lack of progress on key provisions.

During October 2024 leaders of the ONLF claimed that only 20% of the 2018 peace agreement’s commitments, such as reintegrating former fighters and resettling displaced communities, have been met. The group’s spokesperson, Abdiqadir Hassan Hirmooge (Adani), voiced frustration with Ethiopian government inaction, declaring, 'We maintained peace as agreed, but the government’s failure to uphold its obligations raises serious questions about its dedication to lasting reconciliation.' The ONLF also claims cultural suppression in the Somali region, alleging that Somali elders face pressure to renounce their identity and expressing concern over rumors that Ethiopia might alter the region's official name and flag, perceiving this as a threat to Somali cultural identity. On 20 October 2024, the ONLF withdrew from the Ethiopian National Dialogue Commission.

In March 2025 the ONLF accused Ethiopia of abandoning the 2018 peace accord.

== Bibliography ==
- Abdi, Mohamed Mohamud (2021). A History of the Ogaden (Western Somali) Struggle for Self-Determination: Part I (1300-2007) (2nd ed.). UK: Safis Publishing. ISBN 978-1-906342-39-5. OCLC 165059930.
- Ylönen, Aleksi (2022). "The Ogaden National Liberation Front (ONLF) and the dilemma of liberation". Routledge Handbook of the Horn of Africa. Routledge Handbooks. pp. 21–31. doi:10.4324/9780429426957-4. ISBN 9780429426957.
