= Garaad Abdulahi Garaad Soofe =

- Born: Horufadhi
- Died: 19 July 2014; Buuhoodle
- Known for: Garad of Ahmed Garad

Garad Abdullah Garaf Soofe Durraan (Garaad Cabdillaahi G. Soofe Durran), Garad, of the Ahmed Garad, the second most senior chief of the Farah Garad branch of the Dhulbahante clan of the Somali people. He was one of the elders of the Dhulbahante clan. In his later years, he often attended meetings as a representative of the Buuhoodle.

The chiefs and elders of Dhulbahante are divided into pro-Somaliland, pro-Puntland, and distanced from both. Garaad Soofe was distanced from both.

Note that his relatives' names end with Garaad Soofe. For examples, his successor Garaad Abdirisaag Garaad Soofe, his brother Osman Garaad Soofe.

== Career ==
Relation map (2015.) M=Megagle, H=Horufadhi.

Abdulahi (later Garaad Abdulahi Garaad Soofe) was born around 1933–1934 in Horufadhi, Togdheer region of British Somaliland. Received his religious education in Baidoa.

In the late 1970s, Abdulahi spent several years in Saudi Arabia. After that, he was nomadic, working as a Quran teacher in Horufadhi. His father died in August 1983, and his two older brothers died prematurely, so he assumed the role of Garaad(chief) Soofe.

In March 2010, Garaad Abdulahi attended a meeting in Buro Wadal (Buurawadal), where the nature of the so-called SSC regions (Sool, Sanaag, Cayn) was discussed, but he left the meeting as there was no prospect of a solution.

Garaad Abdulahi attended the inauguration of a new mosque in Ceegaag as a delegation representative from Buuhoodle in July 2010.

In November 2010, an inter-clan meeting was held in Megagle to discuss a solution to the fighting between the two clans in Kalshaale. Garaad Abdulahi said it was due to deep-rooted conflicts from the past.

In February 2011, he sent a condolence message to the Somali people who died in Canada, as the first of the elders of the Buuhoodle.

In January 2012, he visited the Khatumo State capital Taleh as one of the representatives of Buuhoodle to meet with the officials.

=== Death ===
He died on July 19, 2014, in Buuhoodle. He is buried in Buuhoodle.

On January 15, 2015, Garaad Abdulahi Garaad Soofe's Brother, Garaad Abdirisaaq Garaad Soofe was inaugurated as chief of the Ahmed Garaad clan. The ceremony was attended by at least 12,000 people.

== Family ==
Garaad Abdulahi had four sons and five daughters.

Osman Garaad Soofe, former deputy minister of interior of Somaliland, is his brother.
