= Shululux =

- Village
- Location in Somaliland Shululux (Somalia)
- Coordinates: 8°36′51″N 46°41′39″E
- Country: Somaliland
- Region: Togdheer
- District: Buuhoodle District

Population (2019)
  - Total: 330
- Time zone: UTC+3 (EAT)

Shululux is a village in Buuhoodle District, in the Togdheer Region of Somalia. The town was previously administered under the Sool Region. It is located north by road from Widhwidh.

== Demographics ==
The village is settled by the Dhulbahante clan. The primary sub-clan that the population descends from belongs to the Jama Siad.
