= Horufadhi =

- Town
- Location in Somalia Horufadhi (Somalia)
- Coordinates: 8°34′35″N 46°24′10″E
- Country: Somalia
- Regional State: Khatumo
- District: Buuhoodle
- Time zone: UTC+3 (EAT)

Horufadhi (Hor-u-fadhi, Horu-fadhi, Horufadi, Horofadhi, Horafadi) is a town in the Togdheer region of Somalia which comes under the Buhoodle District.

== History ==
Relation map.
Bu=Buuhoodle, Ce=Ceegaag, Ho=Horufadhi, Qo=Qorilugud, Wi=Widhwidh

Horufadhi is mentioned as Horufadi in a book published in England in 1951. According to this survey, nomads of the Solemadu branch of the Habr Je'lo, Isaaq clan and the Yahia, Aligherri and Hagar Adan branch of the Dhulbahante clan used wells in Horufadhi during the dry season.

In January 2012, former rebel militias based in Horufadhi and other locations joined the Somaliland army.

In February 2015, Somaliland forces attacked militias in Horufadhi as part of tensions with the Khatumo State.

In March 2016, members of the Somali federal government visited Ceegaag, which led the Somaliland government to establish a military base between Ceegaag and Horufadhi.

According to an April 2016 report, Buhoodle District used to consume crops from southern Somalia, but has increasingly depended on local cultivation around towns such as Horufadhi.

In July 2017, Horufadhi was one of the sources of a cholera outbreak in Togdheer region and international medical assistance was provided.

In September 2017, the Puntland government attempted to send food aid to drought-affected towns including Horufadhi, but the Somaliland government blocked the convoy at Las Anod.

On 14 July 2020, Somaliland security forces from Buuhoodle blocked a ministerial delegation from Puntland entering Horufadhi. This incident underscores the disputed administrative claims over the area.

As of August 2025, the region including Horufadhi is considered part of the North Eastern State (formerly SSC-Khatumo), which has been recognized by the Federal Government of Somalia as a federal member state.

=== Clan dynamics ===
Clashes between sub-clans of the Dhulbahante, particularly Hayaag, Hagar, and Jama Siad, have repeatedly taken place in Horufadhi. These confrontations have sometimes escalated into deadly violence, followed by peace conferences or government mediation. The clan genealogy is generally considered to be as follows:

- Dhulbahante
  - Mohamoud Garad
    - Hayaag
    - Hagar
    - Jama Siad

Date	Location	Event/Description
April 2013	Horufadhi district	One person was killed in a clash between Jama Siad and Hagar sub-clans.
December 2019	Horufadhi district	A murder sparked inter-clan conflict in the town.
June 2020	Horufadhi	Visit by the Somaliland Minister of Public Works and Housing, aimed at resolving clan conflicts.
5 July 2020	Horufadhi district	At least two people were killed in fighting between Hayaag and Hagar sub-clans; the governor of Sool issued a peace appeal.
20 July 2020	Horufadhi	Peace conference between Hayaag and Hagar was concluded, issuing written decisions.
August 2020	Sahdheer	Another reconciliation meeting involving Hayaag and Hagar sub-clans was held.

== Notable people ==
- Garaad Abdulahi Garaad Soofe, One of the elders of the Dhulbahante clan. He was born in Horufadhi with a mother belonging to the Wa'eys Adan clan.
- Abdinasir Haji Ahmed, Sheikh and scholar (1957-2022)
