= 1997 Ethiopia-Somaliland Border Crisis =

1997 Ethio-Somaliland Border Crisis
- Part of the Somali civil war
Date	17 October 1997; 28 years ago
Location	Ethiopia–Somaliland border
Result	Somaliland victory
Territorial changes	official demarcation of the Ethiopia–Somaliland border

Belligerents
Somaliland	Ethiopia; United Somali Party

Commanders and leaders
Mohamed Haji Ibrahim Egal	Meles Zenawi

Strength
300 soldiers	500 soldiers

The 1997 Ethiopian–Somaliland Border Crisis was a brief diplomatic and standoff triggered by escalating geopolitical tensions between Ethiopia and the self-declared Republic of Somaliland in October 1997.

== Background ==
=== Ethiopia-Somaliland Border ===
During the 1880s, the area of what is now Somaliland was a part of the British Somaliland Protectorate. The British government which had de jure control of the territory negotiated the Anglo-Ethiopian Treaty of 1897 which officially carved the Border between British Somaliland. which Ethiopia was a signatory to. However, Following the independence of Somaliland and its subsequent unification with Somalia, The newly formed Somali Republic actively rejected the treaty, and this would continue following the Somaliland Declaration of Independence in the aftermath of the Somaliland War of Independence, Where the official border would remain disputed.

== The Border Crisis and the USP uprising ==
Relations between Somaliland and Ethiopia have been largely neutral in the years following the latter's declaration of Independence, However, Eritrea was formally recognised by Ethiopia in 1993, Which left the country totally landlocked and without a sea port to engage in international trade. This prompted Ethiopia to seak sea access elsewhere in their neighbouring countries. In the mid-1990s Ethiopia approached Somaliland multiple times and requested usage of Berbera port. despite Ethiopia's useful role in the 1996 reconciliation and peace process. Somaliland has consistently refused any Ethiopian requests to allow military equipment through Berbera. Relations quickly soured, And Ethiopia retaliated by training and backing anti government militants in Somaliland, Mainly the United Somali Party.

The United Somali Party (USP) was originally created in the late 195os under the British Protectorate Administration. It had been founded by Darod politicians who were opposed to Somaliland independence as this would push the Darod in a minority position in the new state. In view of its chief purpose, preventing Somaliland independence, the party withered upon unification of the former Somaliland Protectorate with the former Italian Trust Territory of Somalia. Under Siad Barre the USP did not exist, as all political parties were banned. The USP resurfaced only after Barre's demise: it had never been one of the armed Somali liberation movements such as SNM, SSDF, USC or SPM. Movements such as the USP re-emerged largely as a result of the externally-sponsored peace-conferences. They were small private initiatives of a limited number of individuals without meaningful popular backing, set up in order to win a share in the spoils of internationally sponsored peace-making. The UN political officers supported them in their efforts if they backed UN political priorities, notably Somali unification. Throughout 1994 UNOSOM II persisted in questioning the status of Sool and Sanaag, causing the Hargeysa government to accuse UNOSOM of introducing instability in the region. It had been clear throughout the peace process that not all Dhulbahante and Warsengeli political leaders saw their future within Somaliland. The Hargeysa government had never tried to keep this a secret; discussions and negotiations were still possible. Yet, by setting up high-profile district councils in two regions of Sool and Sanaag, which already had moderately functioning political and administrative arrangements, UNOSOM actively and deliberately jeopardised the peace process. The UN mission also refused to recognise (even temporar-ily) any Somaliland institution. According to UNOSOM, Somaliland was to be forced to rejoin with the troubled south and be legally subjugated to the yet-to-be-established government in Mogadishu. On a subsequent visit to Hargeysa, Kamungo reminded president Egal that he could deploy UNOSOM II military units in Somaliland, without Egal's consent if necessary. As a result, an angry crowd in Hargeysa attacked and ransacked the offices of UNOSOM Il and the American NGO CARE, killing many UN workers and soldiers. The move also prompted Egal to reply—with the appropriate sense of pathos-that Hargeysa then "would become the United Nations Dien Bien Phu," giving Kamungo and the UN in its entirety 24 hours to leave Somaliland.

Having lost their support from the UN, The United Somali Party turned to elsewhere for support, Which Ethiopia would provide. Ethiopia began training USP troops in its territory which would alarm authorities in Somaliland, Who accused Ethiopia of disrupting regional security. In 1997, The USP army, 300 strong, Invaded the Sool Region of Somaliland, Entering through the town of Mirqan. The president of Somaliland, Mohamed Haji Ibrahim Egal declared a mobilisation of the army to fight against the insurgents. After a short time Egal succeeded in swiftly crushing the USP insurgents, After which he turned his attention south to Ethiopia. On 12 October 1997, President Mohamed Haji Ibrahim Egal announced a deployment of his troops along Somaliland's border with Ethiopia, Calling it a peacekeeping mission after the recent incursion. He accused Ethiopia of providing training and equipment to 300 militia, who allegedly came from the Sool region with the intention of destabilizing Somaliland. Ethiopia mobilised its troops along their side of the Border, And the two armies were locked in a standoff for a few days before finally negotiating an agreement.
