= Megagle =

Megagle Meygaagle
- Village
- Location in Somaliland Megagle (Somaliland)
- Coordinates: 8°28′N 46°18′E
- Country: Somaliland
- Region: Togdheer
- District: Buuhoodle
- Time zone: UTC+3 (EAT)

Megagle (Somali: Meygaagle) is a village in the Togdheer province of Somaliland. It is located in Buuhoodle District, north by road from Buuhoodle and Sool Joogto on the Megagle Road.
