= Karin Dabayl Weyn =

- Village
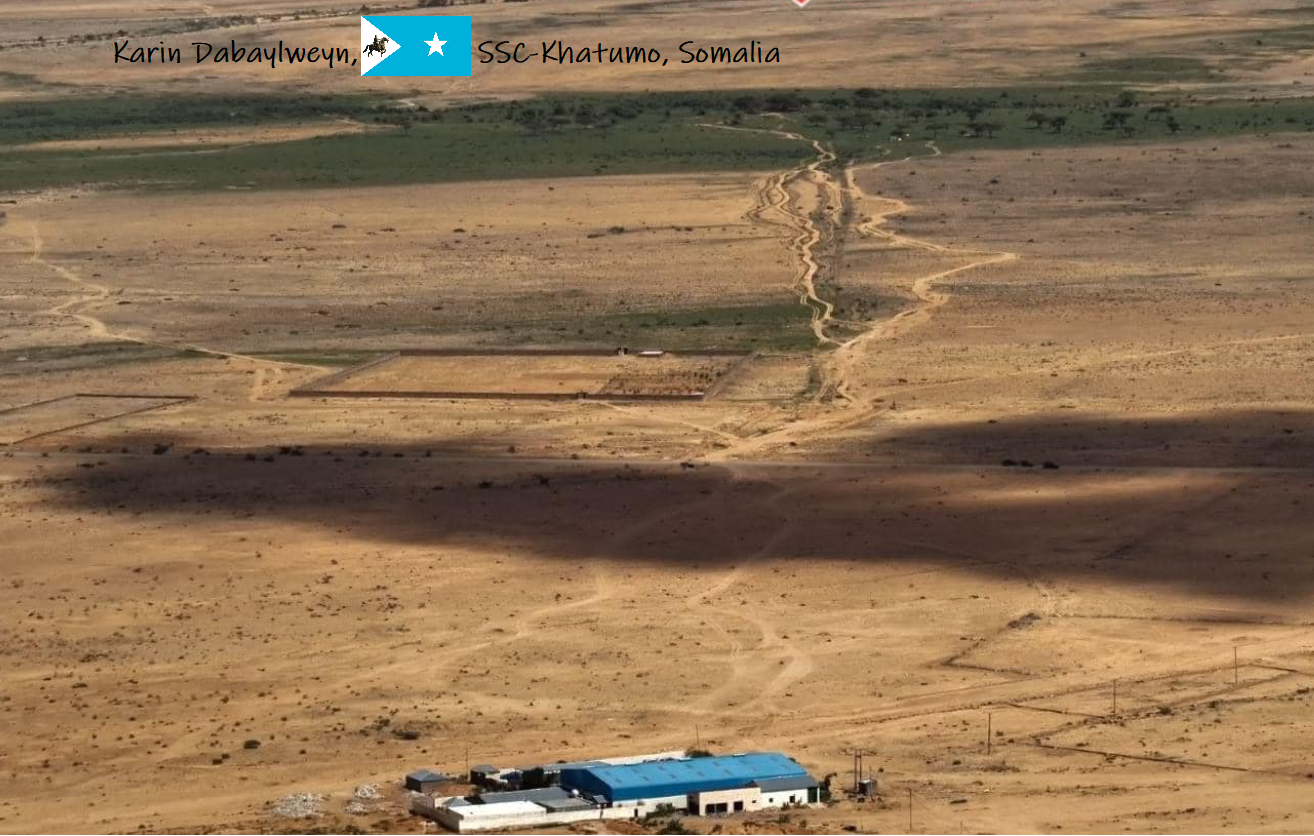

- Location in Somalia Karin Dabayl Weyn (Somaliland) Karin Dabayl Weyn (Somalia)
- Coordinates: 8°6′54″N 47°32′17″E
- Country: Somalia
- Region: Sool
- District: Las Anod

Population (2007)
  - Total: 756
- Time zone: UTC+3 (EAT)

Karin Dabayl Weyn is a village in the southern Sool, Somalia roughly halfway between Weylahayd to the north, and Qoriley to the south.

== History ==
Karin Dabayl Weyn (Karin Dabailwein)'s name is listed in a book published in the UK in 1951 describing British Somaliland.

In November 2013, it was reported that Karin Dabair Wayne was under the control of the Khaatumo State.

In January 2014, one of the three presidents of Khaatumo State, Ahmed Elmi Osman, announced his candidacy for the Puntland vice presidency. Khaatumo, director general of the country's Interior Ministry, who lives in Karin Dabayl Weyn, condemned this.

In February 2014, new Somaliland military bases were created in Karin Dabayl Weyn, Dharkayn Geenyo and other locations. This had the aim of preventing Puntland's vice president from visiting Buuhoodle. The Puntland government condemned this.

In August 2014, a unit with three military wagons disappeared from the Somaliland military base in Karin Dabayl Weyn, along with their unit commander. It is believed to be an unauthorized desertion.

In October 2015, delegations from Garowe, Bosaso, Galkayo, Las Anod, Bo'ame, Buuhoodle, Widhwidh, and others gathered in Karin Dabair Weyne to discuss ending the conflicts occurring in the area.

In September 2017, four people were killed when shots were fired in Karin Dabayl Weyn's restaurant. The people killed were visitors from Burtinle, where Burtinle and Karin Dabair Weyne have been at odds for years.

In December 2017, a clan war broke out between Karin Dabayl Weyn and Qoriley. A ceasefire was agreed upon at the end of December. This conflict had been going on for 12 years.

In September 2018, drought and deforestation in the southern Sool region reportedly made it difficult to raise cattle in Karin Dabayl Weyn, once considered a suitable grazing area.

In June 2020, Puntland forces invaded Karin Dabayl Weyn, but were repelled by Somaliland forces stationed nearby. According to another source, it was Puntland's minister and senator who were repulsed.
