= Cayn =

Region of Somalia

Cayn Gobolka Cayn
- Region
- Interactive map of Cayn
- Country: Puntland/Unilaterally establishment Somaliland/Territorial claims as Buhoodle District; North Eastern/Territorial claims
- Capital: Buuhoodle
- Time zone: UTC+3 (EAT)

Cayn or Ayn is an administrative region that Puntland unilaterally declared to be established in the 2000s. However, there is Somaliland between Cayn and Puntland, and they do not directly border each other. Somaliland has legally designated this area as its territory as Buhoodle District. SSC-Khatumo, which declared its secession from Somaliland in 2023, claims the territories of Sanaag, Sool, and Cayn, as its name implies, and effectively controls Buuhoodle.

Cayn is derived from Aynaba (Somali: Caynaba). Aynaba was inhabited by the Dhulbahante clan until the early 20th century, but the British government armed the Habr Je'lo clan and occupied during the Dervish movement. Since then, Aynaba has been the subject of conflict between Habr Je'lo and Dhulabahante.

== Overview ==
Now, Buuhoodle It is the capital of Ayn region under the administration of Clan militia including being controlled by Somaliland in other parts.

As with much of Somaliland, most local residents in the Cayn region are nomadic pastoralists.

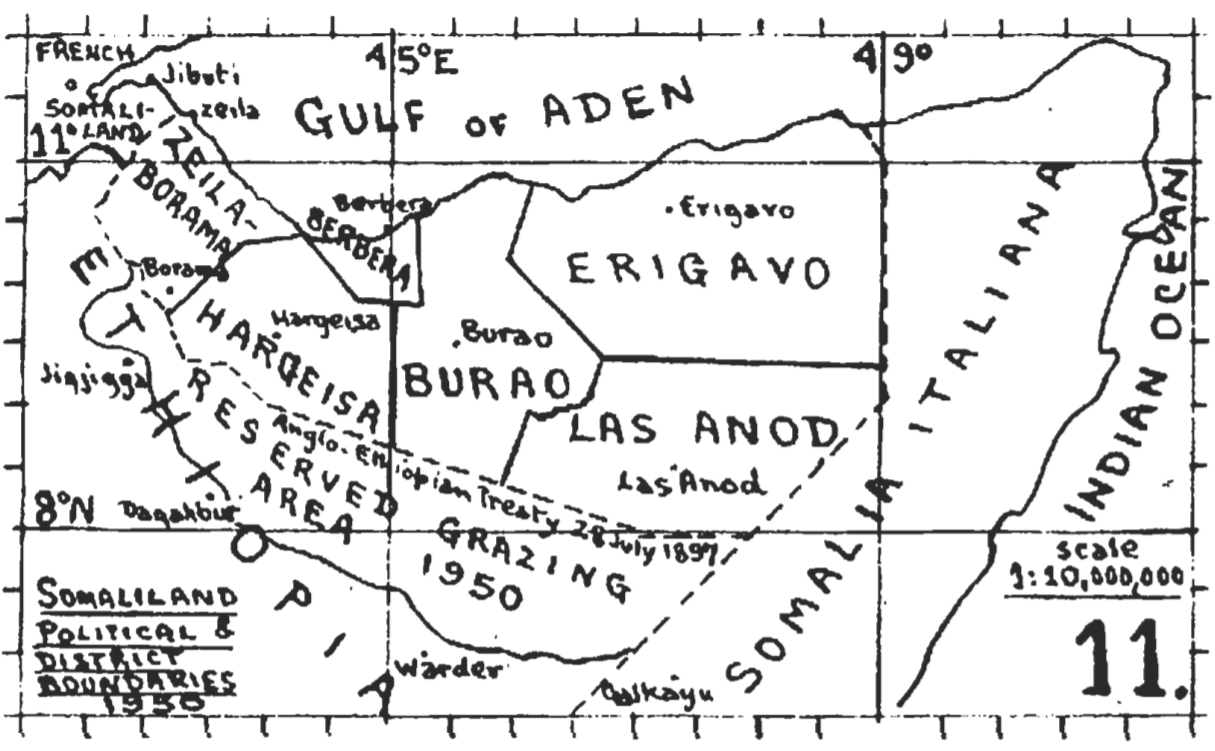
Las Anod-Nogal district from 1944 - 1960.

The region was formerly part of Togdheer region.

Cayn was part of the Las Anod-Nogal District from 1944 with Las Anod as capital until 1974 when the Siad Barre government split the district between the Nugaal and Togdheer regions. John A Hunt stated the following about the Las Anod-Nogal District:

"The Nogal (Las Anod) District defined in 1944. This was supposed to have been done for administrative convenience, but the somewhat crooked boundary between the Burao and Nogal districts suggests that it was intended to make the Las Anod-Nogal District an entirely Dolbahanta Tribal District ... All the Dolbahanta have been Las Anod District since 1944, except for the Naleya Ahmed of the Ogadyahan Siad ... remaining in Erigavo District".

In Somaliland, the Cayn territory is administrated as part of Togdheer region but it is legally part of Sool region as per Article 11, section 1 of the amended Local Government Act which came into force in 2020.

== Districts ==
The Cayn region consists of the following districts:

- Buuhoodle District
- Widhwidh District
- Ceegaag District

== Demographics ==
The Dhulbahante of the Harti Darod clan is well represent in the region.

== Major towns ==
- Buuhoodle
- Widhwidh
- Ceegaag
- Horufadhi
- Odanleh
- Qorilugud

== See also ==
- Somaliland
- Sanaag
