= Somaliland Government Gazette =

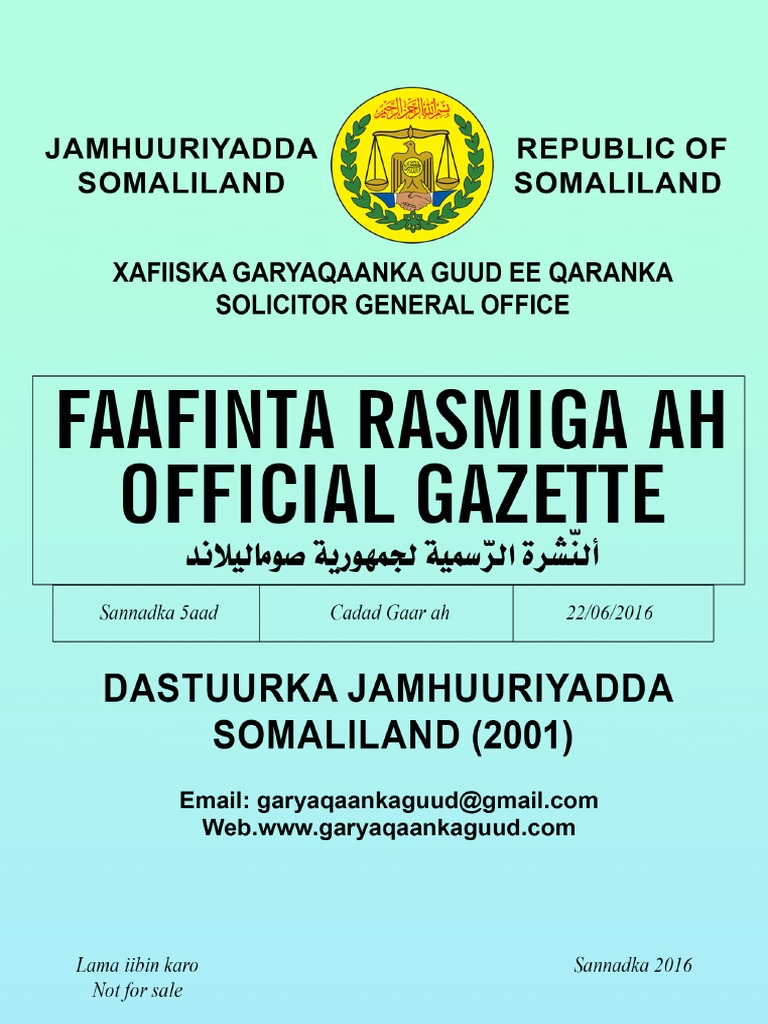
- Constitution of Somaliland 2001 published on the government gazette
- Type: Daily official journal
- Publisher: Government of Somaliland
- Headquarters: Somaliland
- Website: garyaqaankaguud.com/somaliland-official-gazette/

Somaliland Government Gazette (Somali: Faafinta Rasmiga Ah) is the official publication of the Government of Somaliland and publishes laws, ordinances and other regulations.

== Published material ==
The Gazette includes proclamations by the President as well as both general and government notices made by its various departments. It publishes regulations and notices in terms of acts, changes of names, company registrations and de-registrations, financial statements, land restitution notices, liquor licence applications and transport permits. Board and legal notices are also published in the Gazette; these cover insolvencies, liquidation and estate notices.

== See also ==
- List of government gazettes
- Administrative divisions of Somaliland
- Regions of Somaliland
- Districts of Somaliland
- Somalia–Somaliland border
- Ethiopia–Somaliland border
