= Ethiopia–Somaliland border =

International border

Somaliland-Ethiopia border
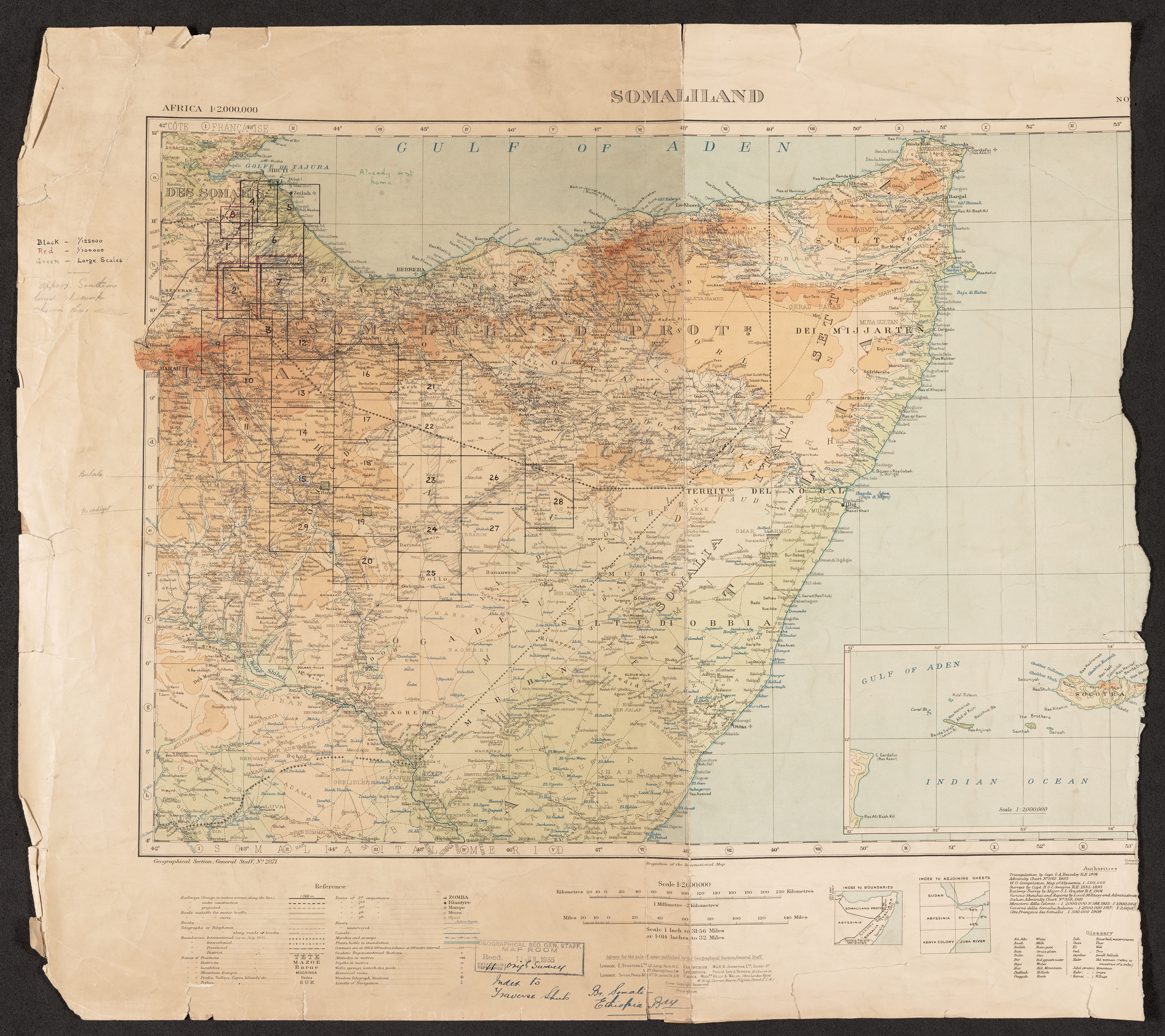
- British Somaliland - Ethiopia Boundary Commission 1932.

Characteristics
- Entities: Ethiopia Somaliland
- Length: 745 kilometers (463 mi)

History
- Established: 1897
- Current shape: 1936
- Treaties: Anglo-Ethiopian Treaty of 1897 and The British Somaliland-Ethiopia Boundary Treaty 1936.

The Ethiopia–Somaliland border is almost as long as the one Ethiopia shares with the rest of Somalia, and Somaliland offers a buffer to Ethiopia against Al-Shabaab attack. Villages like Aleybedey are remote that lies to the border, and have semi-arid with a short rainy season, receiving about 650 millimeters of rain per year. Like Somalia, this border enjoyed vibrant economic interactions conducted by ethnically homogeneous Somalis.

== Incidents ==
The 2010 Ayn clashes saw Somaliland forces engage Dulbahante clan militia in the Buuhoodle district. The battle was prompted by Ethiopian troops seizing a truck belonging to locals in Buuhoodle, sparking a response from residents and Ethiopian retaliatory attack on Buuhoodle and a Somaliland attack upon Widhwidh. More clashes were reported to have occurred near Widhwidh on 19 July 2010.

== See also ==
- Ethiopia–Somalia border
- Somalia–Somaliland border
- Administrative divisions of Somaliland
- Regions of Somaliland
- Districts of Somaliland
