= Kalabaydh, Sool =

Kalabaydh كلبيده
- Town
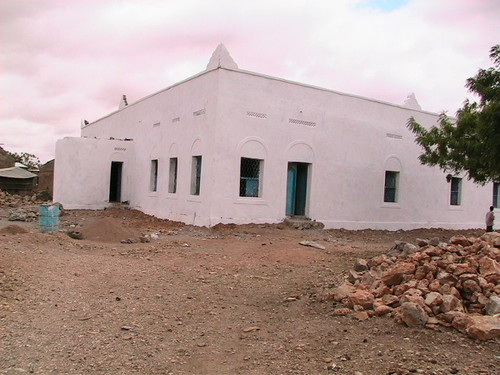
- A mosque in Kalabaydh

- Location in Somalia
- Coordinates: 8°14′35.52″N 47°13′35.04″E
- Country: Somalia
- Regional State: Khatumo
- District: Las Anod

Population (2019)
  - Total: 41,000
- Time zone: UTC+3 (EAT)

Kalabaydh is a town in the southern Sool region of Somalia.

== Overview ==
Local control was disputed between Somaliland and Puntland.

Presently, the SSC-Khaatumo administration holds control over Kalabaydh and was recently visited by a delegation led by President Abdikhadir Ahmed Aw-Ali on December 16th, 2023.

== Demographics ==
Kalabaydh lies within Dhulbahante-inhabited areas of southern Sool and hosted displaced people during the 2023 Las Anod conflict. Some local reporting associates Kalabaydh with the Baharsame branch of the Dhulbahante, including community meetings held in the town.

== Economy ==
Kalabaydh’s local economy centres on pastoralism and related trade. After seasonal rains in late 2017, large numbers of pastoralist families and herds moved into the town from surrounding regions, with trucks transporting people and goods through the settlement.

Transport links have been expanded. In February 2020, a 32 km highway project linking Las Anod and Kalabaydh was launched to improve the movement of goods and services in southern Sool; subsequent local coverage in 2021 noted that this road was underway. In April 2024, field reports described renewed movement along the Kalabaydh–Widhwidh corridor following the wider Sool conflict, indicating gradual normalisation that underpins small trade and services.

Water-supply infrastructure has also been targeted for investment. A tender sought contractors to rehabilitate the Kalabaydh borehole, build a 40 m³ elevated concrete water tank and three water kiosks, and extend the distribution pipeline by 4 km, reflecting efforts to stabilise household and livestock water access.

== Politics ==
In 2023, the wider Sool region experienced renewed conflict centred on Las Anod, drawing attention from the United Nations Security Council and humanitarian organisations. In the aftermath, humanitarian actors reported needs across southern Sool, including Kalabaydh.

Medical assistance in Kalabaydh was documented by Médecins Sans Frontières (MSF) in 2024, when the organisation listed the town among its project locations in Sool region. This followed MSF’s withdrawal from Las Anod General Hospital in July 2023 due to insecurity.

Local political developments also included a visit by the SSC-Khatumo leadership to Kalabaydh in December 2023, as reported on their official channels.

== Mayor ==
=== Mahad Ali Samatar ===
In August 2011, Mahad Ali Samatar (Mahad Cali Samatar) was serving as mayor of Kalabaydh and publicly contested what he described as an unlawful attempt by a Somaliland minister to remove him from office. He was still cited as the local chief of Kalabaydh in December 2017 during an influx of pastoralist families after seasonal rains. His tenure ended by 30 December 2019, when Mohamed Ali Hayaan took office in a formal handover ceremony.

=== Mohamed Ali Hayaan ===
Mohamed Ali Hayaan (Maxamed Cali Hayaan) took office as mayor on 30 December 2019 in a handover overseen by the Sool regional executive secretary, acting on the governor’s order. At the ceremony, the new municipal leadership highlighted immediate security needs in the district, including requests to increase police staffing and vehicles.

== Education ==
Kalabaydh has several academic institutions.

According to the Puntland Ministry of Education, there are eight primary schools in the Kalabaydh District. These include Kalabayr Primary, Sahdheer, Widhwidh, and Qoriley.

Secondary schools in the area include Kalabaydh Secondary.
