= Baran, Sool =

Baran Baaraan
- village
- Location in Somaliland Baran (Somaliland)
- Coordinates: 8°16′1″N 47°15′39″E
- Country: Khatumo
- Region: Sool
- District: Las Anod
- Time zone: UTC+3 (EAT)

Baran (Somali: Baaraan) is a village in the Sool region of Somalia. It is between Las Anod, the regional capital of Sool, and Kalabaydh. The main road that runs from the regional capital to the southeast is named after it. It is primarily inhabited by the Baharsame subclan of the Dhulbahante. In 1906 Baran was made part of the Darwiish grazing ground. It is located a dozen or so kilometers to the west of Weylahed, the second Darwiish capital in 1901.

== See also ==
- Administrative divisions of Somaliland
- Regions of Somaliland
- Districts of Somaliland
- Somalia–Somaliland border
