= Sool Joogto =

- Town
- Location in Somaliland Sool Joogto (Somaliland)
- Coordinates: 8°26′14″N 46°19′53″E
- Country: Somaliland
- Regional State: Khatumo
- District: Buhoodle
- Time zone: UTC+3 (EAT)

Sool Joogto is a village in the Togdheer region of Somaliland. It comes under Buuhoodle District.

In recent history, the city held a ceremony of inducting one of its local clan elders, Mohamed Suleiman Awed (Maxamed Saleebaan Cawed), who is a major clan elder in the city of Buuhoodle, while also promoting and strengthening the unity and prosperity in the towns that the locals inhabit in Buuhoodle District.

== Demographics ==
As with most towns in Buuhoodle District, Sool Joogto was founded by the Dhulbahante. It is primarily inhabited by the Adan Ahmed subclans of the Farah Garad sections of the Dhulbahante, with the Wa'eys Adans sub-lineage well represented in the town.

== See also ==
- Administrative divisions of Somalia
- Regions of Somalia
- Districts of Somalia
