= Higlo =

- Town
- Location in Somaliland, Somalia Higlo (Africa)
- Coordinates: 9°05′55.2″N 46°05′14.9″E
- Country: Somaliland
- Region: Sool
- District: Aynabo District
- Time zone: UTC+3 (EAT)

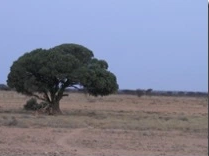
The evergreen Higlo tree

Higlo is a town in Burao, in the Togdheer region of Somaliland.

== Demographics ==
Higlo is inhabited by the reeryoonis Musa Abokor.

== Overview ==
Higlo is situated in the Aynaba District in the western part of Sool region. Higlo is northwest of Aynaba, the administrative seat of the wider district.
