= Darantaleh =

- Town
- Location in Somaliland. Darantaleh (Somaliland)
- Coordinates: 9°3′0″N 48°29′0″E
- Country: Somaliland
- Region: Sool
- Time zone: UTC+3 (EAT)

Darantaleh is a town in the eastern Sool region of Somaliland.
