= Ogaden =

Historic name of Somali Region in Ethiopia

Coordinates: 7.28°N 44.30°E

Ogaden: Ogaadeen (Somali); ውጋዴ/ውጋዴን (Amharic)
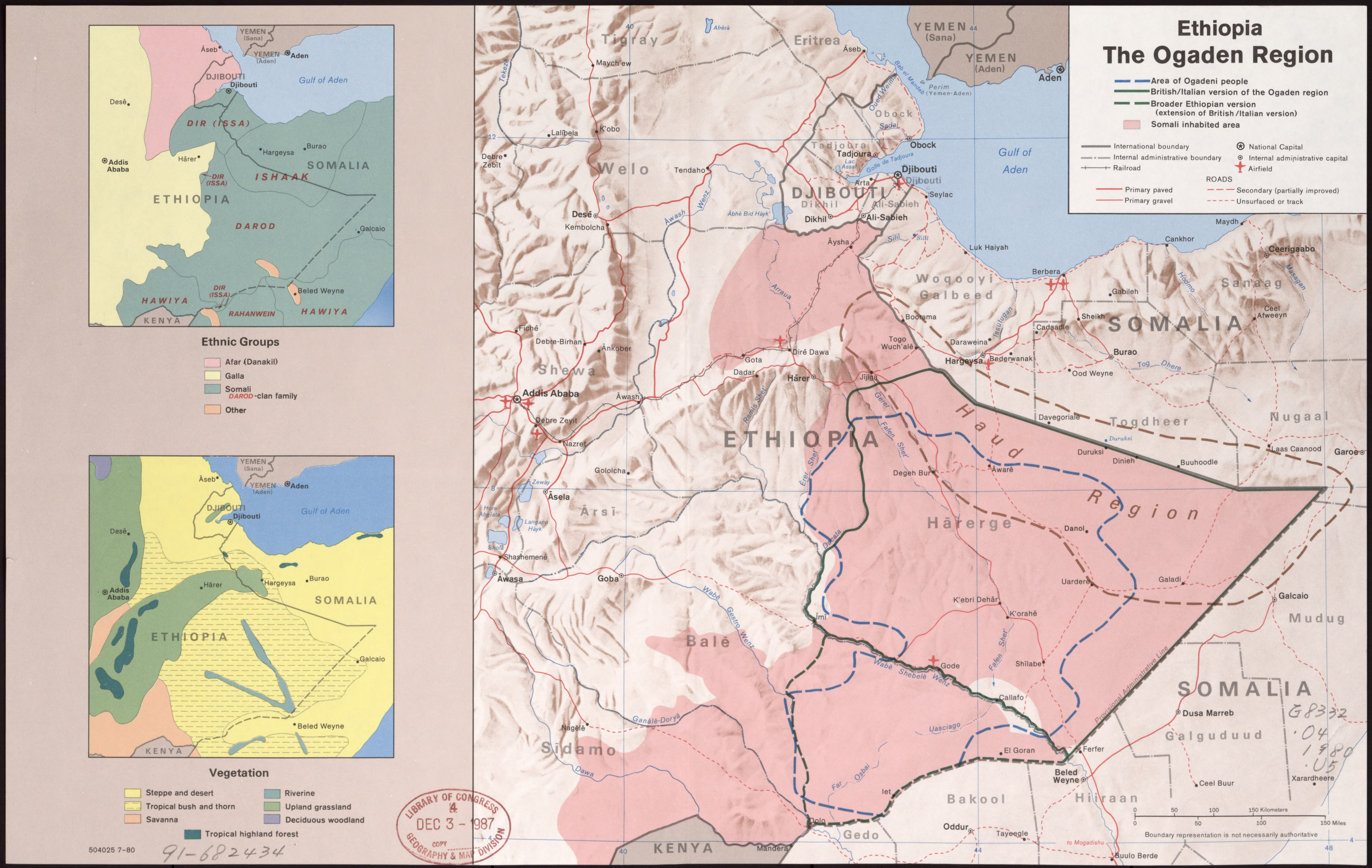
- Map of the Ogaden region in red
- Country: Ethiopia
- Region: Somali Region

Area
  - Total: 327,068 km^{2} (126,282 sq mi)
  - Water: 9,842 km^{2} (3,800 sq mi)
- Demonym: Somali

Ogaden (pronounced and often spelled Ogadēn; Somali: Ogaadeen, Amharic: ውጋዴ/ውጋዴን) is one of the historical names used for the modern Somali Region. It is also natively referred to as Soomaali Galbeed (lit. 'Western Somalia'). The region forms the eastern portion of Ethiopia and borders Somalia.

The Ogaden is a vast plateau located to the south and southeast of the Ethiopian Highlands, and is overwhelmingly inhabited by Somali people. It represents the westernmost region inhabited by the Somalis in the Horn of Africa. It is largely a semi-arid region and encompasses the plains between the border of Somalia and Ethiopia, extending towards the southeastern highlands, where larger cities like Harar and Dire Dawa are located near. The Ogaden is known for its oil and gas reserves.

The Ogaden region has been defined by over a century of popular revolts and armed Somali self-determination movements following a process of annexation that began with the invasion of the region by the Ethiopian Empire in the 1890s and concluded with the final British handovers of the region in the mid-1950s. Prior to late 19th century Ethiopian expansion, the Ogaden was inhabited by organized Somali communities and remained independent of Ethiopian imperial rule. Ethiopia's legal claim to the region is predicated on the Anglo-Ethiopian Treaty of 1897, which the Somali Republic rejected as invalid following its independence in 1960.

Since the end of the 19th century, armed organizations such as the Dervish movement, Nasrallah, the Western Somali Liberation Front, Al-Itihaad Al-Islamiya, and most recently the Ogaden National Liberation Front have been at the forefront of the region's struggle for independence.

== Etymology ==
The origins of the term Ogaden has been an elusive question. It is usually attributed to the Somali clan of the same name, referring only to their land originally, and eventually expanding to encompass most parts of the modern Somali Region of eastern Ethiopia. The Ogaden clan's name itself comes from their progenitor, Abdirahman Absame's nickname of Ogaadeen, which is a Somali term that means "He who takes care of another". An alternative (possibly folk) etymology analyses the name as a combination of the Harari word ūga ("road") and Aden, a city in Yemen, supposedly deriving from an ancient caravan route through the region connecting Harar to the Arabian Peninsula.

During the new region's founding conference, which was held in Dire Dawa in 1992, the naming of the region became a divisive issue, because almost 30 different ethnic Somali clans live in the region. The ONLF sought to name the region 'Ogadenia', whilst the non-Ogadeni Somali clans who live in the same region opposed this move. As noted by Abdul Majid Hussein, the naming of the region where there are several Somali clans as 'Ogadenia' following the name of a single clan would have been divisive. Finally, the region was named the Somali region.

== Demographics ==
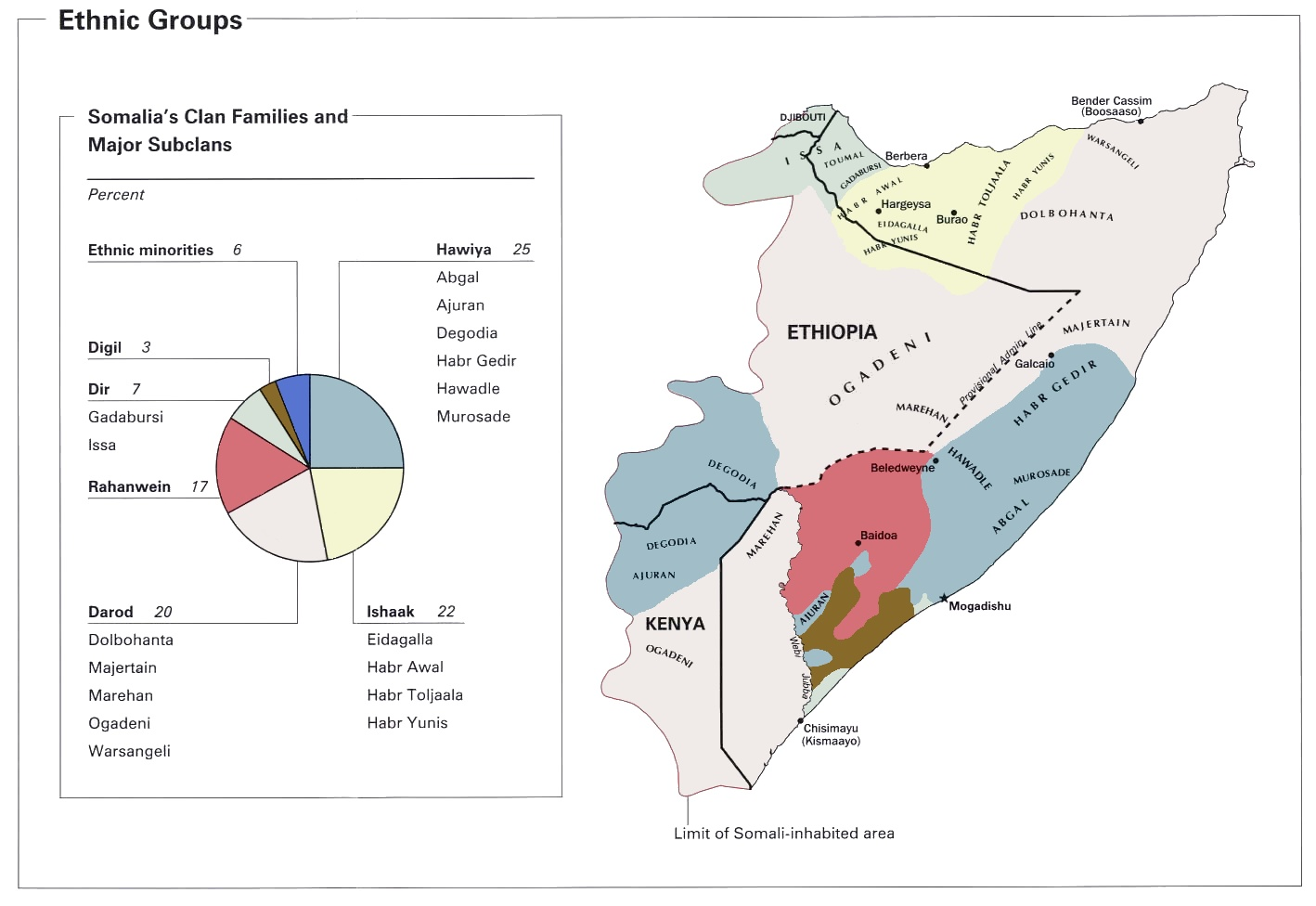
Somali-inhabited region within Ethiopia shown as part of Greater Somali territory

The inhabitants are predominantly ethnic Somalis, of almost 30 clans. The Ogaden clan of the Darod constitute the majority in the region, and were enlisted in the Ogaden National Liberation Movement, which is why the region is associated with the Ogaden clan. Other Somali clans in the region are Sheekhaal, Marehan, Isaaq, Geri Koombe Gadabuursi, Issa, Massare, Gabooye, Degodia, Jidle, as well as the Karanle clans of Hawiye.

== History ==
There are few historical texts written about the people who lived in what is known today as the Somali Region, sometimes referred to as "The Ogaden" region of Ethiopia. The vast majority of the inhabitants today are Muslim and ethnically homogenous. In its early history, the Ogaden was inhabited by Harla, a now extinct people. Harla are linked to the Harari and Somali Ogaden clan. The region became one of the earliest footholds for the spread of Islam into Africa. At the time, rivalries between the established Muslims in the Ogaden were recurring with those of the littoral in Zeila.

The Ogaden region was part of the Ifat Sultanate in the 13th century and later the Adal Sultanate in the 15th century. The city of Harar, serving as the effective capital of Ogaden, became a key administrative center for Adal. In the first half of the 16th century, the Ethiopian–Adal War broke out. Ahmad ibn Ibrahim al-Ghazi, the Imam of Adal, launched a jihad against Abyssinia in response to escalating Abyssinian incursions into Muslim territories. Repeated military expeditions from the highlands into the southeast over several decades prior significantly unified the Somali and other Muslim communities in the region, who then joined Imam Ahmed's jihad. Abyssinian attacks were frequent and intense during the 15th and 16th centuries, but they halted in the mid-17th century, not resuming until Emperor Menelik's expansions at the end of the 19th century. The regional successor of Ifat and Adal, the Ajuran Sultanate, governed its territories from Qalafo along the upper Shabelle River in eastern Ogaden until its decline in the 17th century.

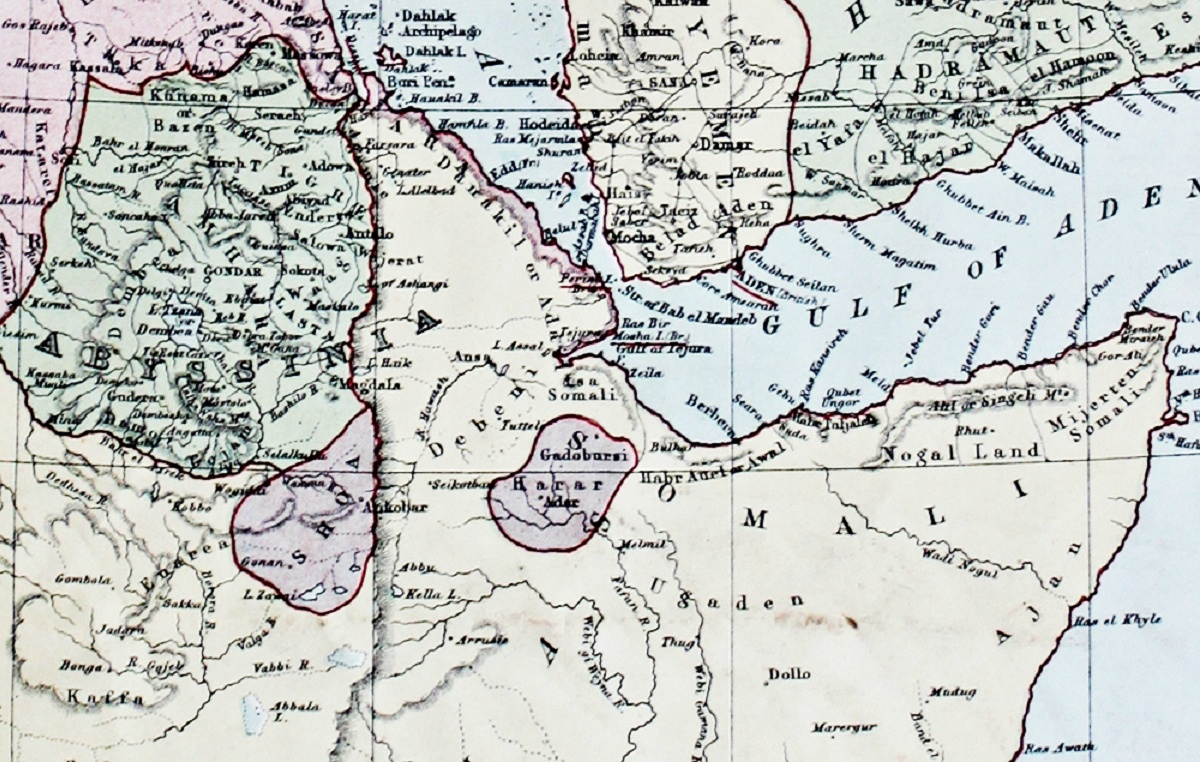
1873 cartography by John Bartholomew designating "Ugaden" east of Harar

Beginning in the seventeenth century, the Ogaden region served as a vital conduit for the slave trade. Primarily from the Arsi, slaves would eventually find their way to Berbera to be sold to international slave dealers. Historian Ali Abdirahman Hersi, who specializes in Somali history, indicates that the Emirate of Harar continued to engage in trade, albeit at a reduced scale, and established settlements in the Ogaden region after the fall of the Adal Sultanate. The residents of these settlements encountered simultaneous assaults from both the Oromo and Somali, compelling them to construct a defensive wall.

During the pre-colonial era the Ogaden was neither under Ethiopian rule, nor Terra nullius, as it was occupied by organized Somali communities. Independent historical accounts are unanimous that previous to the penetration into the region in the late 1880s, Somali clans were free of Ethiopian and Shewan control. It has been observed that geographers mapping out the continent of Africa for the British government in the mid to late 1800s made no reference of any Ethiopians in the Ogaden, and maps from before 1884 drew the Ethiopian Empire's domain as confined by the River Awash.

=== Menelik's invasions and Anglo-Ethiopian Treaty (1887–1897) ===
After the Battle of Chelenqo, where the Emirate of Harar's extensive forces were vanquished by the Abyssinians, the emir Abdullahi II, sought refuge in the Ogaden. In 1887, Ethiopian Emperor Menelik II conquered the city of Harar during his efforts to expand the empire and in 1891, announced a programme of ambitious colonialism to the European powers. This marked the start of a tentative yet violent invasion into the Ogaden region. In the first phase of Ethiopian penetration into the region, Menelik dispatched his troops from occupied Harar on frequent raids that terrorized the region. Indiscriminate killing and looting was commonplace before the raiding soldiers returned to their bases with stolen livestock. Repeatedly between 1890 and 1900, Ethiopian raiding parties into the Ogaden caused devastation. Imperial military expeditions dispatched into the Ogaden engaged in the torching of Somali settlements, and foreign travelers in the region widely reported countless stories of suffering at the hands of the Abyssinian invaders.

Menelik's expansion into Somali inhabited territory coincided with the European colonial advances in the Horn of Africa, during which the Ethiopian Empire imported a significant amount of arms from European powers. The large scale importation of European arms completely upset the balance of power between the Somalis and the Ethiopian Empire, as the colonial powers blocked Somalis from receiving firearms. However the Ethiopians were also defeated numerous times by poorly armed Somalis such as in 1890 near Imi where Makonnen's troops had suffered a large defeat to Somali warriors. A British hunter Colonel Swayne, who visited Imi in February 1893, was shown "the remains of the bivouac of an enormous Abyssinian army which had been defeated some two or three years before."

Before the emergence of the anti-colonial Dervish movement in the 20th century, Somalis had limited access to firearms. When European colonial powers began to exert influence in the Horn of Africa, the Brussels Conference Act of 1890 imposed an arms embargo on the Somali population. During the same period Ethiopian Emperor Menelik, who was legally armed with rifles by European powers through the port cities of Djibouti and Massawa, began expanding into Somali inhabited territories. British colonial administrator Francis Barrow Pearce writes the following concerning the Ethiopian raids into the Ogaden:

The Somalis, although good and brave fighting men, cannot help themselves. They have no weapons except the hide shield and spear, while their oppressors are, as has already been recorded, armed with modern rifles, and they are by no means scrupulous concerning the use of them in asserting their authority...The Abyssinians themselves have no more claim (except that of might) to dominate the wells than a Fiji Islander would have to interfere with a London waterworks company.

A report in the New York Times about a Somali victory over the encroaching Ethiopians during 1897

In 1897 in order to appease Menelik's expansionist policy Britain ceded almost half of the British Somaliland protectorate to Ethiopia in the Anglo-Ethiopian Treaty of 1897. Ethiopian authorities have since then based their claims to the Ogaden upon the treaty and the exchange of letters which followed it. International law professor W. Michael Reisman, observed that, "as a matter of law and fact, the 1897 treaty was void because it presumed an authority which the Somalis had never accorded to Great Britain." The Somalis, he notes, had given no authority to the British to transfer Somali territory to another state. In fact, the British had committed to protecting Somali territory, the primary reason for the Protectorate, and in attempting to transfer the land to Ethiopia, they were acting without competence, exceeding their jurisdiction, and concluding an agreement without the participation of the central party. Furthermore, Reisman notes that even had treaty originally been valid, it would have been invalidated by Ethiopia's failure to commit to key legal obligations.

=== 1900s ===
As Emperor Menelik II continued his campaign of indiscriminate raiding and attacks against the Somalis of the Ogaden region between 1890 and 1899, Somali clans residing in the plains of Jigjiga were in particular targeted. The escalating frequency and violence of the raids resulted in Somalis consolidating behind the Dervish Movement under the lead of Sayyid Mohamed Abdullah Hassan. As the Ethiopian Empire began expanding into Somali territories at the start of the 1890s, the town of Jigjiga came under intermittent military occupation until 1900. At the start of the year, Abyssinian troops occupied the town with the construction of a fort in the outskirts. Subsequently, the anti-colonial Dervish Movement led by Sayid Mohamed Abdullah Hassan had its first major battle when it attacked the Ethiopian forces occupying Jigjiga to free livestock that had been looted from the local population.

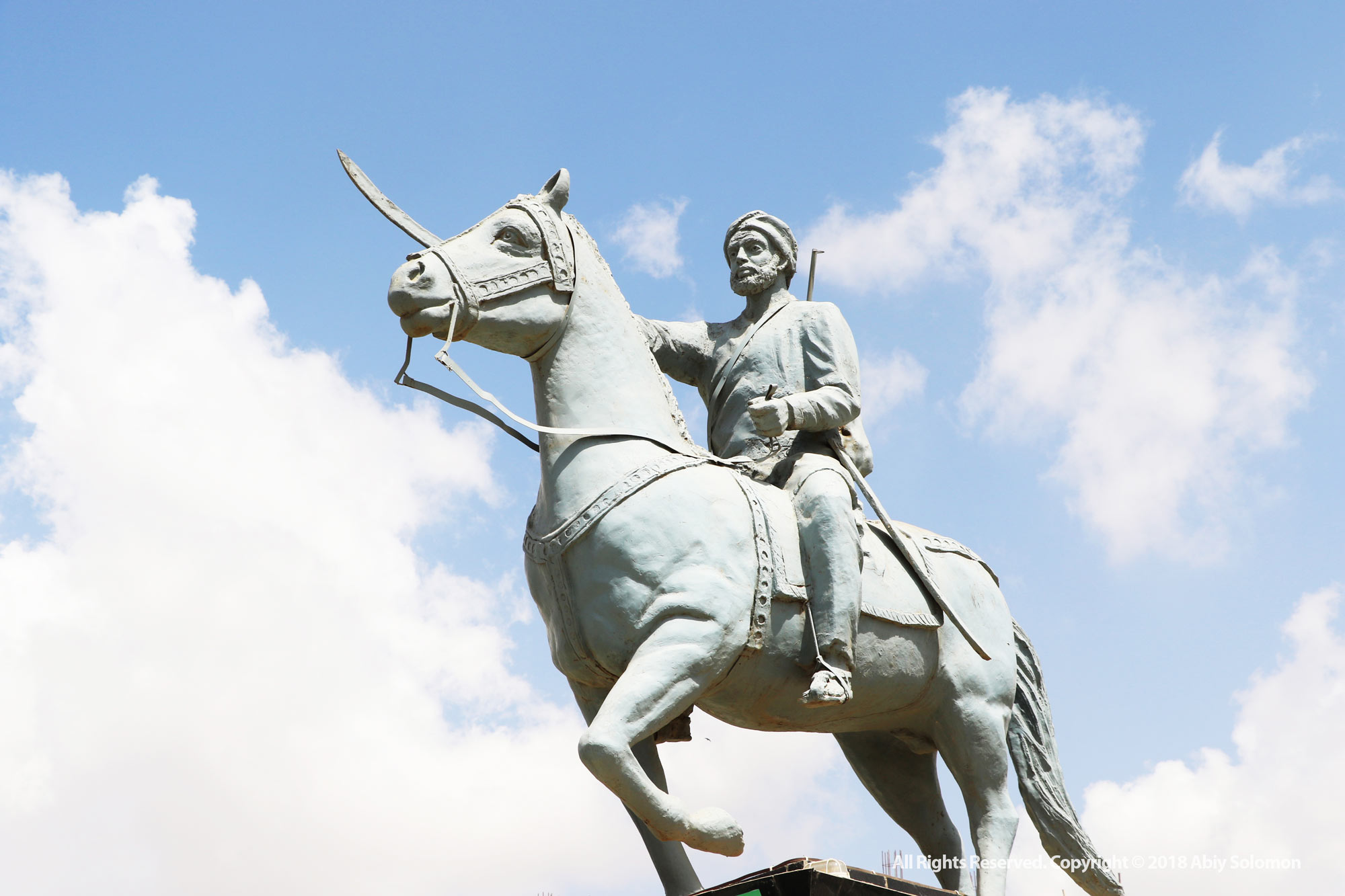
Statue of Mohammed Abdullah Hassan in Ethiopia, legend from the early 1900s

The Ethiopian hold on Ogaden at the start of the 20th century was tenuous, and administration in the region was "sketchy in the extreme". Sporadic tax raids into the region often failed and Ethiopian administrators and military personnel only resided in Harar and Jijiga. Control over the region was expressed through intermittent raids and expeditions that aimed to seize Somali livestock as tribute. Attempts at taxation in the region were called off following the massacre of 150 Ethiopian troops in January 1915.

In the 1920s and 1930s, there were no permanent Ethiopian settlements or administration in any Somali inhabited land, only military encampments. Due to native hostility, the region was barely occupied by Ethiopian authorities, who exerted little to no presence east of Jijiga, until the Anglo-Ethiopian boundary commission in 1934 and the Wal Wal incident in 1935. It was only after 1934 when the Anglo-Ethiopian boundary commission attempted to demarcate the border, did the Somalis who had been transferred to the Ethiopian Empire during the 1897 treaty realize what had happened. This long period of ignorance about the transfer of their regions was facilitated by the lack of 'any semblance' of effective control by the Somalis to indicate that they were being annexed by Ethiopia.

In the years leading up to the Second Italo-Ethiopian War in 1935, the Ethiopian hold on the Ogaden remained tenuous. After the Italian conquest of Ethiopia in 1936, Ogaden was attached to Italian Somaliland, becoming the Somalia Governorate within the new colony of Italian East Africa. Following the British conquest of this colony, the Anglo-Ethiopian Agreement placed Ogaden under temporary British control. The British sought to unite Ogaden with British Somaliland and the former Italian Somaliland to realize Greater Somalia which was supported by many Somalis.

==== Ogaden and Haud transfer (1945–1955) ====
Following World War II, Somali leaders in the Ogaden region of Ethiopia repeatedly put forward demands for self-determination, only to be ignored by both Ethiopia and the United Nations. Ethiopia unsuccessfully pleaded before the London Conference of the Allied Powers to gain the Ogaden and Eritrea in 1945, but their persistent negotiations and pressure from the United States eventually persuaded the British to cede Ogaden to Ethiopia in 1948. The last remaining British controlled parts of Haud were transferred to Ethiopia in 1955. The population of the Ogaden did not perceive themselves to be Ethiopians and were deeply tied to Somalis in neighboring states. Somalis widely considered Ethiopian rule in the Ogaden to be a case of African colonial subjugation.

In 1948, the British Military Administration, which had been in control of the Ogaden since WWII, commenced a withdrawal. This transition saw the replacement of British officials with Ethiopian counterparts between May and July of that year in a significant handover process. In the town of Jijiga, incoming Ethiopian authorities instructed the Somali Youth League (SYL) to remove their flag, as they had declared both the party and its emblem as unlawful. The SYL defied this directive, leading to the flag being machine-gunned by an armored vehicle. This event escalated following the killing of a police officer after a grenade was thrown of the roof of the SYL headquarters. The police responded by firing into a crowd of protesters killing 25. Following this incident, Ethiopian administration resumed in Jijiga for the first time in 13 years. Then, on 23 September 1948, following the withdrawal of British forces and the appointment of Ethiopian district commissioners, areas east of Jijiga were placed under Ethiopian governance for the first time in history. The SYL was banned and an attempt was made to ban all Somali political activity in the region. Tens of thousands of Somalis fled the Ethiopian military in the Ogaden during this period, and were recognized by Britain and Italy as political refugees.

In the mid-1950s, Ethiopia for the first time controlled the Ogaden and began incorporating it into the empire. In the 25 years following the commencement of Ethiopian rule in this era, hardly a single paved road, electrical line, school or hospital was built. The Ethiopian presence in the region was always colonial in nature, primarily consisting of soldiers and tax collectors. The Somalis were never treated as equals by the Amhara invaders and were scarcely integrated into the Ethiopian Empire.

=== Post-Somali Independence ===
Following Somalia's independence in 1960, the Ogaden was rocked by waves of popular revolts which were brutally repressed by Emperor Haile Selassie's government - resulting in deep animosity developed towards the Amharas by the Somalis. In many towns, Somali people were barred from employment. During this period, the newly independent Somali Republic and the Ethiopian Empire under Haile Selassie were on the verge of full-scale war over the Ogaden issue, particularly in 1961 and in the border war of 1964. Though the newly formed Somali government and army was weak, it had felt pressured and obliged to respond to what Somali citizens widely perceived as oppression of its brethren by an Ethiopian military occupation.

In a bid to control the population of the region during the 1963 Ogaden revolt, an Ethiopian Imperial Army division based out of Harar torched Somali villages and carried out mass killings of livestock. Watering holes were machine gunned by aircraft in order to control the nomadic Somalis by denying them access to water. Thousands of residents were driven out from the Ogaden into Somalia as refugees. At the peak of the 1963 revolt, the Somali insurgents fighting for self-determination under the banner of 'Nasrallah' controlled nearly 70 percent of the Ogaden region. The Americans and the Israelis began assisting the Ethiopians in violently suppressing the Somali independence movement in the region.

For nearly a year after the 1964 war, most major Somali towns in the Ogaden were under direct military administration, and the Ethiopian government also introduced a new policy of encouraging Amhara farmers to resettle in the valuable pastureland's available in the Ogaden that were used by Somali nomads’ herds as grazing areas. Under new laws, Somali nomads had no recognized claim to these territory and were harassed by the military as a result. Wells frequented by nomads were poisoned, and new ones were created for the incoming migration of Amhara farmers and imperial army troops concurrently launched economic warfare on the nomadic way of life by devastating massive herds of invaluable livestock.

==== 1970s ====
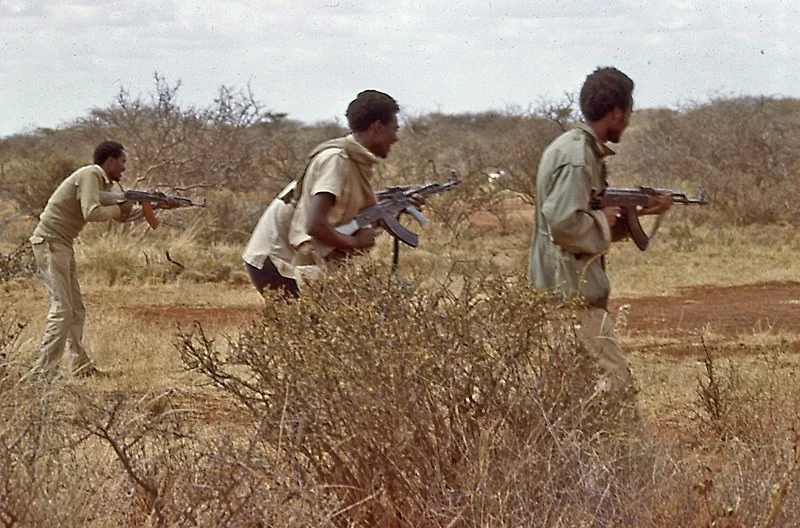
Western Somali Liberation Front (WSLF) militants in the Ogaden

Throughout the late 1970s, internal unrest in the Ogaden region continued as the Western Somali Liberation Front (WSLF) waged a guerrilla war against the Ethiopian government. Ethiopia and Somalia fought the Ogaden War during 1977–78 over the region and its peoples. After the war, an estimated 800,000 people crossed the border into Somalia where they would be displaced as refugees for the next 15 years. The defeat of the WSLF and Somali National Army in early 1978 did not result in the pacification of the Ogaden. The post-war period was characterized by six years of intense counterinsurgent warfare by the Ethiopian state against the Somali rebels.

At the end of 1978 the first major outflow of refugees numbering in the hundreds of thousands headed for Somalia and were bombed and strafed during the exodus by the Ethiopian military. During 1979, the Western Somali Liberation Front persisted in its resistance, regaining control of rural areas.

==== 1980s ====
Foreign correspondents who visited the Ogaden during the early 1980s noted widespread evidence of a 'dual society', with the Somali inhabitants of the region strongly identified as 'Western Somalis'. Artificial droughts and famine were induced by the Derg regime to break down Somali opposition to Ethiopian rule in the Ogaden. In the early 1980s the Ethiopian government rendered the region a vast military zone, engaging in indiscriminate aerial bombardments and forced resettlement programs. During 1981 there were an estimated 70,000 Ethiopian troops in the Ogaden, supported by 10,000 Cuban army troops who garrisoned the regions towns.

In the years following the 1977–1978 Ogaden War, many supporters of the Western Somali Liberation Front (WSLF) became disillusioned with the organizations increasing reliance on Mogadishu and were frustrated by international portrayals of the struggle in the Ogaden as merely a border matter between Ethiopia and Somalia. They would go on to form the Ogaden National Liberation Front (ONLF).

As the Derg began collapsing in the late 1980s, President Mengistu also attempted to reduce the need for troops in Ogaden by making it an Autonomous Region - a concession toward local secessionist sentiment. Ten of thousands of refugees in the region began returning, increasingly so as the Somali Democratic Republic began collapsing as well.

=== Fall of the Derg and rise of ONLF ===
During 1991, the Derg regime fell and the population of the region swelled by almost 30% as hundreds of thousands of returnees came from Somalia.

An ONLF a central committee was formed in January 1992, laying the foundation for an organized and cohesive organization. By the time Mengistu had fallen, the ONLF had significantly consolidated its position in the region. Since 1992, the Tigray Peoples Liberation Front (TPLF) dominated EPRDF government sought to curb Somali demands for self-determination by influencing politics in the region. Many of the Ethiopian troops sent to the Ogaden by Addis Ababa were Tigrayans from northern Ethiopia with no understanding of the culture or region. The central government portrayed the ESDL as a pan-Somali organization in contrast to the Ogaden clan dominated ONLF. While many Somalis saw the ESDL as a merely an extension of the Ethiopian government, the strategy put the ONLF under greater pressure. Despite an agreement between the central government and the ONLF to cooperate on security and administration in the lead up to the 1992 elections, a mutual suspicion existed. Following the 1992 attack on Al-Itihaad, mistrust of the EPRDF within the ONLF greatly deepened.

To take part in the upcoming 1992 regional elections the two existing Somali political entities in the Ogaden, the ONLF and Al-Itihaad Al-Islamiya (AIAI), organized themselves into different constituencies across the Ogaden. Later that year the Ethiopian government forces attacked AIAI's headquarters in the region killing several high ranking figures. Following the attack, Al-Itihaad quickly regrouped and declared a jihad against the Ethiopian military presence in the region. As fighting between AIAI and the Ethiopian military raged throughout 1992, a serious internal debate and two factions emerged within the ONLF over whether to join the war. One wing argued that it was clear that the new Ethiopian government was not serious about self-rule and democracy, so the armed struggle should be resumed. The opposing side argued that the government should still be given a chance considering the upcoming regional elections slated for December 1992. It was also noted that the organization only possessed a small military wing. Eventually the argument to refrain from joining the war and struggle through democratic means prevailed, and the government's war against AIAI ended in a ceasefire soon before the elections.

During the December 1992 elections for District Five (what later became the Somali Region), the ONLF won 80% of the seats of the local parliament. Though the war between Al-Itihaad and the government had ended before the election, AIAI did not participate. During the new region's founding conference, which was held in Dire Dawa in 1992, the naming of the region became a divisive issue. Almost 30 Somali clans live in the Somali Region of Ethiopia. The ONLF sought to name the region 'Ogadenia', whilst the non-Ogadeni Somali clans who live in the same region opposed this move. As noted by Abdul Majid Hussein, the naming of the region where there are several Somali clans as 'Ogadenia' following the name of a single clan would have been divisive. Finally, the region was named the Somali region.

The 1995 general elections were boycotted by the majority of the ONLF, Al-Itihaad and large segments of the Ogaden population due to governments heavy handed interference in the political process. Some ONLF members who opposed the boycott participated in the elections, and performed poorly. Major discontent was provoked by the EPRDF led government after it had moved the state capital from Gode to Jigjiga in 1994. Following the boycott, the government went so far as to form another organization called 'New ONLF'. The 'New ONLF' and ESDL won the 1995 elections and then merged into the Somali People's Democratic Party (SPDP).

Young men from the region were forcibly recruited by the central government to fight in the Eritrean–Ethiopian War during 1999.

=== 2000s ===
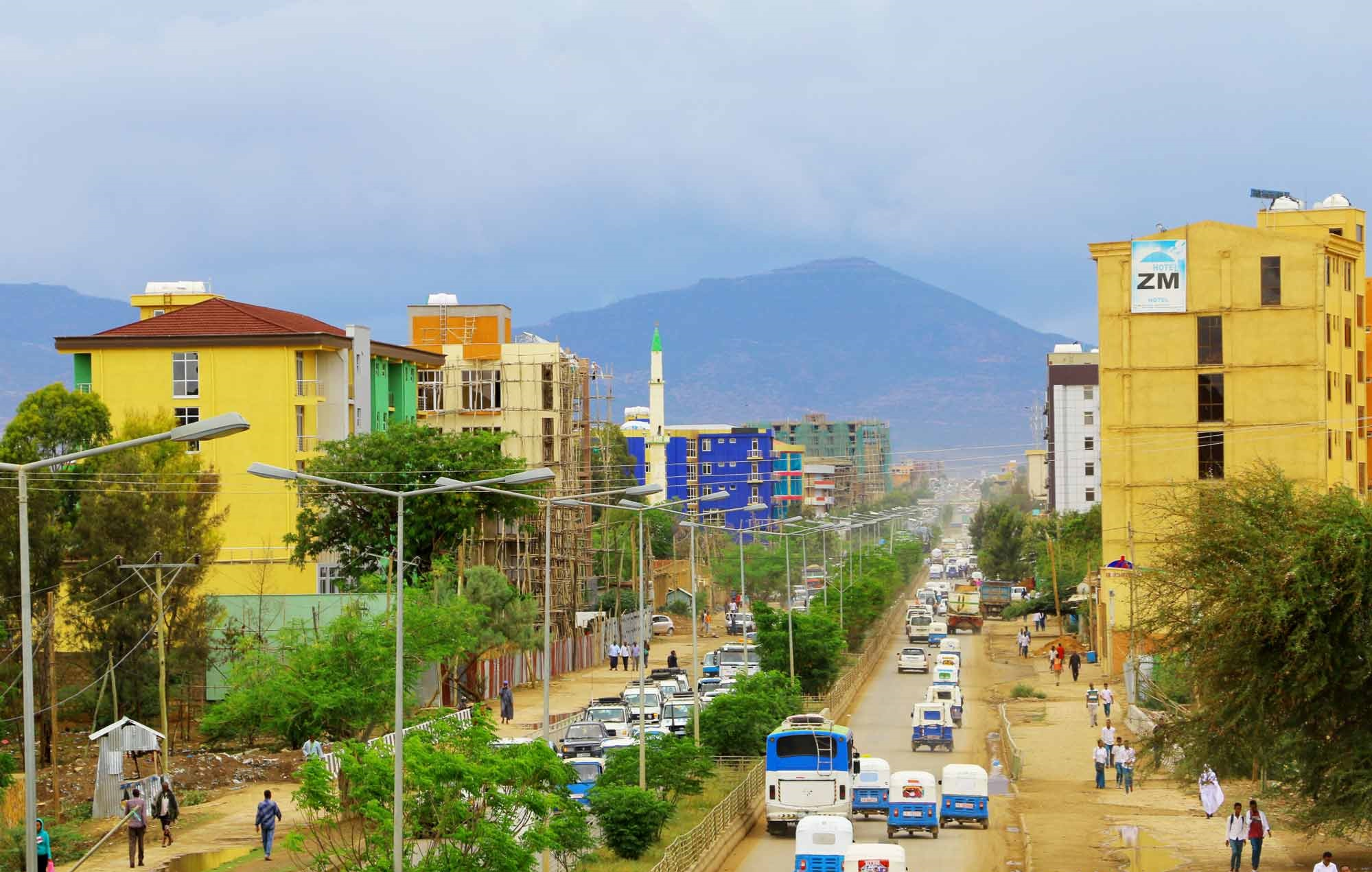
Street scene in Jijiga, Somali Region

In the early 2000s, the Ogaden National Liberation Front expanded its military capabilities and intensified attacks on Ethiopian military positions in the region, with a marked escalation in armed conflict by 2005. Hostilities further escalated in early 2007 as the ONLF launched increased attacks in response to Ethiopia’s 2006 invasion of Somalia aimed at the Islamic Courts Union (ICU). The Ogaden was at the heart of the dispute between Addis Ababa and the ICU, which supported the ONLF.

During 2007–2008, the Ethiopian government initiated a crackdown in Ogaden following the Abole oil facility raid. Some Somalis who inhabit in the 'Ogaden' claimed that Ethiopian military kill civilians, destroy the livelihood of many of the ethnic Somalis and commit crimes against the nomads in the region. However, testimony before the United States House of Representatives Committee on Foreign Affairs revealed massive brutality and killings by the ONLF rebels, which the Ethiopian government labels "terrorists." The extent of this war can't be established due to a media blockade in the 'Ogaden' region. Some international rights organizations have accused the Ethiopian government of committing abuses and crimes that "violate laws of war," as a recent report by the Human Rights Watch indicates. Other reports have claimed that Ethiopia has bombed, killed, and raped many Somalis in the Ogaden region, while the United States continues to arm Ethiopia in the United States' ongoing war on terror in the Horn of Africa.

== Geography ==
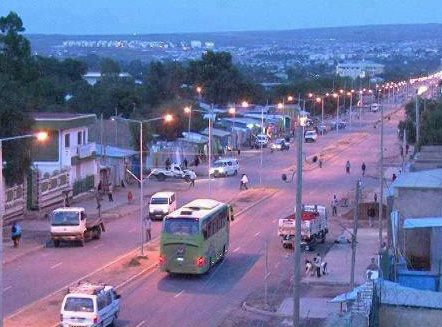

The Somali Region, the second largest region in Ethiopia is around 300,000 square kilometres (120,000 sq mi), and borders Djibouti, Kenya and Somalia. Important towns include Jijiga, Degahbur, Gode, Kebri Dahar, Fiq, Shilabo, Kelafo, Werder and Danan.

=== Ecology ===
The Ogaden is part of the Somali Acacia–Commiphora bushlands and thickets ecoregion. It has been a historic habitat for the endangered African wild dog, Lycaon pictus; However, this canid is thought by some to have been extirpated from Ogaden.

The Ogaden is a plateau, with an elevation above sea level that ranges from 1,500 metres (4,900 ft) in the northwest, falling to about 300 metres (980 ft) along the southern limits and the Wabi Shebelle valley. The areas with altitudes between 1,400 and 1,600 metres (4,600 and 5,200 ft) are characterised as semi-arid, receiving as much as 500–600 millimetres (20–24 in) of rainfall annually. More typical of the Ogaden is an average annual rainfall of 350 millimetres (14 in) and less. The landscape consists of dense shrubland, bush grassland and bare hills. In more recent years, the Ogaden has suffered from increasingly erratic rainfall patterns, which has led to an increasing frequency of major droughts: in 1984–85; 1994; and most recently in 1999–2000, during which pastoralists claim to have lost 70–90 percent of their cattle. It also includes another region in the north known as Haud.

== See also ==
- Ogaden Basin
- Insurgency in Ogaden
- Ogaden (clan)
- Ogaden War

== Bibliography ==
- Abdi, Mohamed Mohamud (2021). A History of the Ogaden (Western Somali) Struggle for Self-Determination: Part I (1300-2007) (2nd ed.). UK: Safis Publishing. ISBN 978-1-906342-39-5. OCLC 165059930.
- Lewis, I.M., ed. (1983). Nationalism & Self Determination in the Horn of Africa. Ithaca Press. ISBN 978-0-903729-93-2.
- Drysdale, John (1964). The Somali Dispute. New York: Frederick A. Praeger Inc. LCCN 64-13122. OCLC 467147.
- FitzGibbon, Louis (1985). The Evaded Duty. London: Rex Collings. ISBN 0860362094. OCLC 15018961.
- Ylönen, Aleksi (2022). "The Ogaden National Liberation Front (ONLF) and the dilemma of liberation". Routledge Handbook of the Horn of Africa. Routledge Handbooks. pp. 21–31. doi:10.4324/9780429426957-4. ISBN 9780429426957.
- Fitzgibbon, Louis (1982). The Betrayal of the Somalis. R. Collings. ISBN 0860361942.
