= Buuhoodle =

Buuhoodle بوهودله
- City
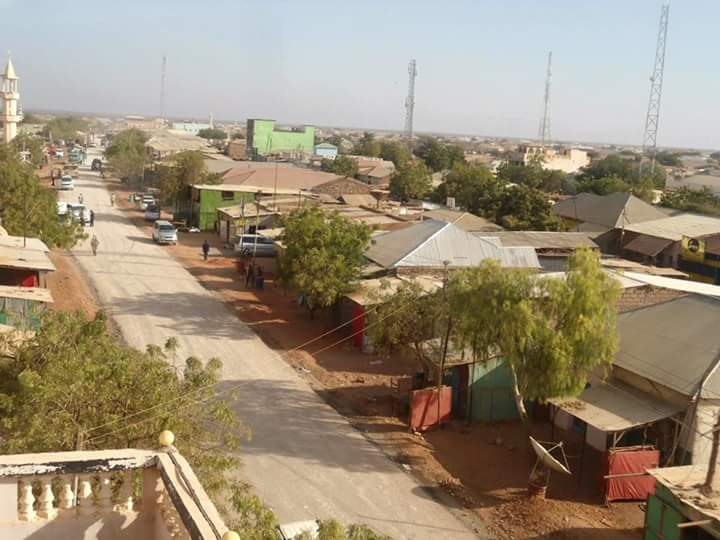

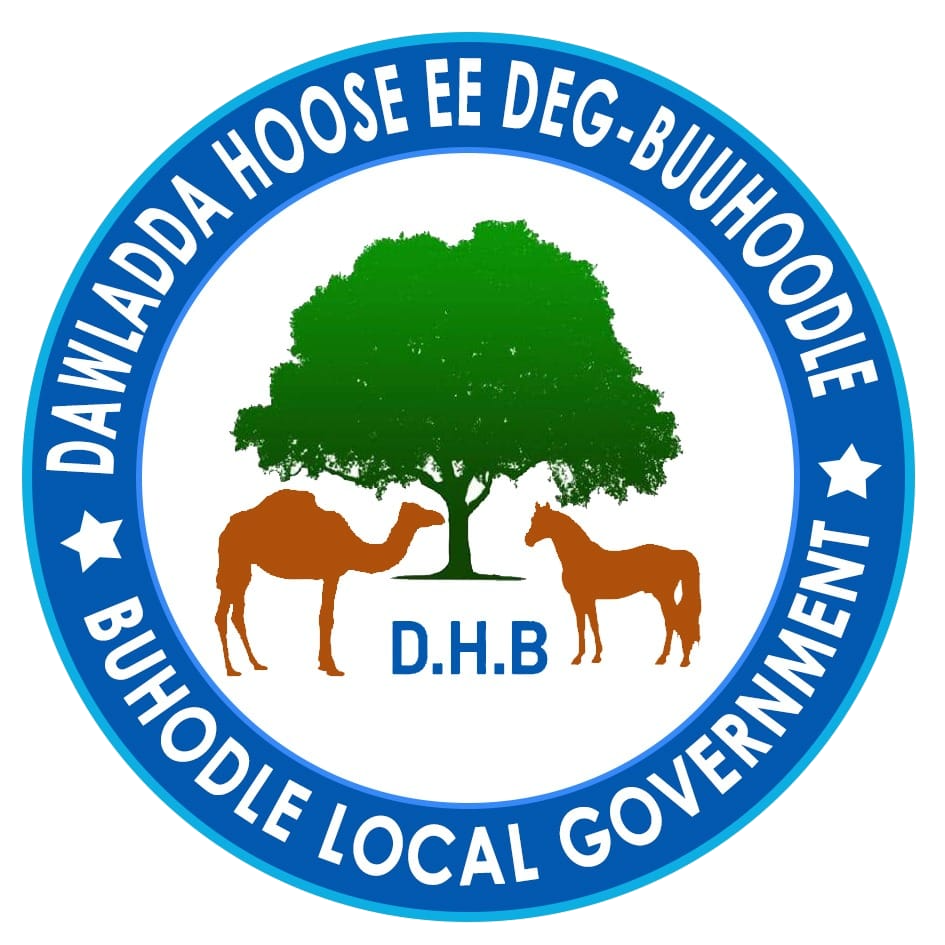
- Seal

- Location in Somalia
- Coordinates: 8°13′52″N 46°19′36″E
- Country: Somalia
- Regional State: (Khatumo) North Eastern State
- Region: Cayn

Government
  - Type: District Council

Population (2006)
  - Total: 11,373
- Time zone: UTC+3 (EAT)

Buuhoodle (Somali: Buuhoodle, Arabic: بووهودل), also known as Bohotle, serves as a significant border town for the movement of goods between Somalia and Ethiopia's Somali Region. The surrounding district is rich in livestock with growing agricultural activities.

== Geography ==
Physiographically, Buuhoodle is located in Ciid, and geopolitically, on the border between Somalia and Ethiopia.

== Economy ==
Buuhoodle functions as a commercial hub for goods moving to and from Bosaso, Garowe, Las Anod, Galkayo, Wardheer, Burao, the surrounding area, and the Ogaden. According to research on cross-border trade, Puntland has imposed tariffs on goods coming from the former British Somaliland, but not on goods from places such as Badhan and Buuhoodle that are outside Somaliland's control. Somaliland has set up a customs office in Las Anod to apply tariffs on goods from Puntland; however, the tariff is reduced to 40 percent within a 60-kilometer radius around Las Anod, and the Buuhoodle district falls in the reduced-tariff area.

== Demographics ==
The town had an estimated population of 11,373 as of 2006, with the broader Buuhoodle District having an estimated population of 83,747 residents in 2014. Buuhoodle is primarily inhabited by people from the Somali ethnic group, with the clan eponyms of Ararsame and Bah Ali Gheri of Dhulbahante especially well-represented.

== Local clan relations and leadership ==
Traditional leaders have periodically convened or visited in Buuhoodle. In October 2015, a peace delegation led by Garaad Abdulahi Garaad Soofe held meetings in the town, reflecting efforts by Dhulbahante traditional authorities to mediate local disputes and relations with neighboring administrations.

== Education ==
According to a 2013 survey by the Puntland Ministry of Education, there were 12 primary schools, 3 high schools and 2 universities in the Buuhoodle District. Among the primary schools are H/dh Abu-Bakar Sadiq, H/dh Al-Najax and H/dh Al-Furqan. Secondary schools in the area include Howd and Samatar Bahman. For health education, there is Buhodle College Of Health Science. For higher studies, Buuhoodle is served by East Africa University (EAU), which opened a seventh branch in the town on 18 April 2012 to serve pupils from the Cayn region.

== History ==
=== Dervish period ===
The Dervish Movement emerged in Buuhoodle and localities in its vicinity. A contemporaneous report by The Marion Star on 30 April 1903, summarizing British intelligence dispatches, stated that through marriage Sayid Mohamed Abdullah Hassan extended his influence “from Abyssinia on the west to the borders of Italian Somaliland on the east,” and that the Ali Gheri “were his first followers,” identifying that group as early adopters of the Dervish identity. The Parliamentary Papers (1850–1908, vol. 48) recorded that “Haji Muhammad Abdullah belongs to the Habr Suleiman Ogaden tribe; however, his mother is the Dolbahanta Ali Gheri. He also married into the Ali Gheri, amongst whom he now lives,” indicating residence and kin ties among Ali Gheri communities south of Buuhoodle. Patricia Morley (1992) cites British intelligence assessments characterizing the Ali Geri as the Sayid's “old allies,” anticipating that the “Mullah” might flee east to rejoin them south of Bohotele, where pursuit would be difficult for Abyssinian or British forces.

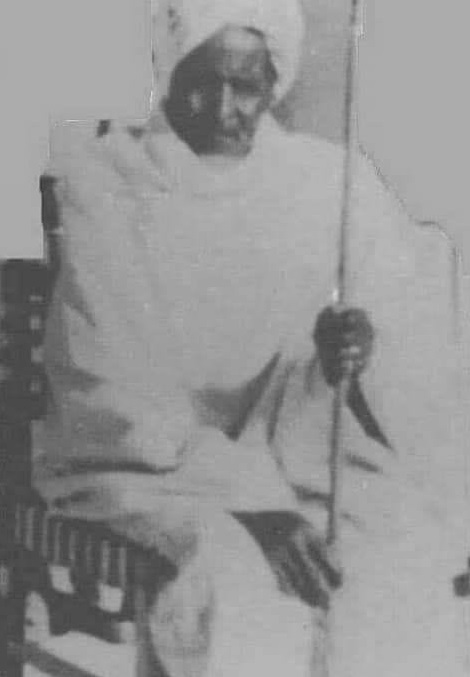
Commander-poet Ismail Mire (pictured) administered the largest infantry Shiikhyaale

Malcolm McNeill (1902) described the Bah Ali Gheri—the largest sub-clan in Buuhoodle—as leading opponents of European penetration, writing that “the two principal offenders were the Ali Gheri tribe, who had for a long time made the whole Dolbahanta country unsafe for Europeans without a large escort.” The 1907 Official History of the Operations in Somaliland 1901–04 estimated that casualties inflicted on Ali Gheri forces in actions around McNeill's zariba, the subsequent pursuit in Ali Gheri country, and at Ferdiddin “cannot have fallen far short of some 1,200 men killed,” and that captured camels were distributed as compensation to looted Isaaq tribes or handed to soldiers in lieu of pay. James Hayes Sadler, a senior British official, argued that unless joint operations with Abyssinia were undertaken to suppress the Sayid, he would divert forces “to punish tribes who are Mullah's principal supporters round Bohotele,” remarking that eastern Isaaq tribes were friendly and united. In 1902, Eric Swayne told the House of Commons that after failed attempts to combine Ogaden tribes, the Sayid retired east “to Bohotle with the Dolbahanta tribes, his own kinsmen, who have always proved to be the backbone of his following.” In 1904, a disease resembling smallpox was reported in a British African unit near Buuhoodle.

=== Dervish raids ===
The years 1911–1912 were tumultuous for Dhulbahante communities around Bohotle and the Ain valley. Governor Horace Byatt reported that about 800 Dhulbahante refugees reached Berbera but that the garrison—approximately 300 native infantry and 200 King's African Rifles—was insufficient to deter a Dervish attack; he also warned that refugees in transit risked being looted by hostile clans, particularly the Habr Yunis. Intelligence officer Hastings Ismay summarized earlier raids, noting that an attack on the Ali Gheri at Bohotleh in November 1911 was followed by assaults in February and March 1912 that left local Dolbahanta destitute and drove them out; he wrote that “Bohotleh remained in Dervish hands.” Colonial administrator Sir Douglas Jardine later described the Dolbahante as ousted from ancestral pastures, bereft of stock and wandering without asylum in Isaaq areas. These conditions extended across the Protectorate amid British retrenchment to the coast, remembered locally as Xaaraame Cune (“time of eating filth”), with scholarly estimates that roughly one third of the population perished.

=== Environmental shocks and regional conflicts (1974–1979) ===
Between 1974 and 1975, a severe drought known as Abaartii Dabadheer (“the lingering drought”) struck northern Somalia, including present-day Somaliland and parts of northern Puntland; the Soviet Union airlifted tens of thousands of pastoralists from affected areas such as Aynaba and Beer. In 1977–1978, the Ogaden War between Somalia and Ethiopia generated a massive refugee flow into Somalia from the Somali Region of Ethiopia; humanitarian accounts estimate hundreds of thousands of arrivals who remained displaced for years, affecting border districts connected by trade routes through Buuhoodle and the wider Haud.

=== Late Somali Republic and collapse (1980–1991) ===
Tensions escalated in the 1980s as insurgencies spread across Somalia. In northern regions, conflict between the government and the Somali National Movement intensified in 1988, with heavy bombardments of major towns in Togdheer and Woqooyi Galbeed that caused widespread destruction and displacement across the region. The Somali state collapsed in 1991 following the overthrow of the Barre government.

=== Transition and de facto administrations (1991–1998) ===
After 1991, de facto authorities were established in parts of the former British Somaliland, while governance structures in borderland districts fluctuated. Scholarly fieldwork indicates that up to the late 1990s—prior to 1999—neither Somaliland nor Puntland administered Buuhoodle directly in a sustained manner, reflecting the area's peripheral and contested position along clan and historical boundaries.

=== After the Somali Civil War ===
Prior to 1999, neither Somaliland nor Puntland was involved in the administration of Buuhoodle. As their competing claims deepened after 1998, the International Crisis Group summarized that Puntland bases its claim on kinship ties (notably Majeerteen–Dhulbahante), while Somaliland grounds its claim on the boundary of the former British Somaliland Protectorate. In November 2000, an armed clash between two sub-tribes of the Dhulbahante clan occurred in Buuhoodle, killing four people. In October 2001, the Puntland government claimed Sool, eastern Sanaag, Bari, northern Mudug, Nugal and the district of Buuhoodle as its territory, while the same month's rains did not alleviate pasture drought conditions. In August 2002, the Somaliland Armed Forces established a military division and appointed a new commander for the combined areas of Sool and Buuhoodle districts. A major drought affected the wider area in November 2004. In October 2007, fighting between Somaliland and Puntland forces in Las Anod displaced residents toward Garoowe, Buuhoodle, Kalabaydh and the Haud.

=== SSC and Somaliland ===
In 2009, the SSC established a government based in Buuhoodle, confronting Puntland and Somaliland. In May 2010, clashes in Buuhoodle involving Somali and Ethiopian forces killed at least 13 people, and in July 2010 thousands of residents were displaced by fighting between SSC and Somaliland forces. The SSC rejected a ceasefire in August 2010, and both Somaliland and SSC rejected a peace effort brokered between elders from Burao and Buuhoodle later that month. By 2011, SSC had collapsed due to internal conflicts.

==== Khatumo and Somaliland ====
In January 2012, fighting broke out between local militias and Somaliland forces in Buuhoodle. At the end of January, reports suggested Ethiopian cooperation with local militias, which Somaliland's Foreign Minister denied. In February 2012, clashes between Somaliland and Khatumo forces caused civilian deaths and displacement, and in April further fighting occurred between pro-Khatumo militias and Somaliland forces. In February 2014, Somaliland forces occupied villages including Kalabaydh, Karindabaylweyn and Xamar lagu xidh, preventing Puntland Vice President Abdihakim Abdullahi Haji Omar from visiting Buuhoodle. Severe drought struck in April 2014, and in December 2014 the Somaliland Ministry of Finance established a customs office in Buuhoodle that generated significant revenue. In June 2014, Puntland launched an EU-backed tree-planting campaign targeting five towns including Buuhoodle, aiming to plant 25,000 trees by year-end. In September 2015, Puntland's Ministry of Health and the Food and Agriculture Organization began vaccinating 100,000 goats in Buuhoodle district and surrounding areas, while October 2015 saw a peace delegation led by Garaad Abdulahi Garaad Soofe meet in the town. In December 2015, Puntland Vice President Abdihakim Abdullahi Haji Omar visited Buuhoodle, and in January 2016 fighting again broke out between Somaliland and Khatumo forces in the district.

=== Recent history (2016–2022) ===
In April 2016, armed militias opposed to Khatumo reportedly seized control in Buuhoodle. In February 2017, forces aligned with President Farmaajo under Cabdifataax Is-diid entered the town; Is-diid declared neutrality toward both Somaliland and Khatumo. Inter-clan fighting was reported in August 2017. On 1 August 2018, a suicide bombing in Buuhoodle killed Abdifatah Mohamed Ali, formerly in the government of Prime Minister Omar Sharmarke, and Ahmed Mohamed Dolal, a former Khatumo interior minister. In September 2019, officers stationed in Buuhoodle stated that they belonged to Puntland rather than Somaliland, and in October 2019 Puntland announced a 25-member Buuhoodle District Council. In December 2019, an SSC group was announced in Buuhoodle as a unification of Sool, Sanaag and Cayn; the following day Somaliland minister Abdirashid Haji Duale urged residents not to cooperate, calling the rebels an attempt to profit from war. In May 2020 the Somali federal Minister of Insurance visited by air to deliver medical supplies against COVID-19, and in July 2020 inter-clan conflict halted logistics toward Las Anod and Burao. In June 2021, the Buuhoodle mayoral election was held in Widhwidh and Khadija Ahmed Yussuf of the Kulmiye Party was elected; she became the first female mayor chosen by majority vote, though voter registration was not conducted in Buuhoodle's urban area and therefore the 2021 Somaliland parliamentary and municipal elections did not take place in the town.

=== Recent developments (2023–present) ===
In January 2023, a Somaliland MP representing Buuhoodle backed the government regarding the Las Anod unrest and criticized forces opposing Somaliland.

Humanitarian and security reporting documented significant volatility in late 2024. UNHCR's Flash Alert (5 November 2024) reported that escalating clan conflict in Buuhoodle District displaced over 26,000 individuals, many fleeing toward Buuhoodle town and nearby areas.

In March 2025, Horndiplomat reported that during proceedings before the Puntland regional military court involving defendants accused of ties to ISIS and Al-Shabaab, one defendant claimed that Buuhoodle hosted an Al-Shabaab training camp.

== Notable residents ==
- Abdihakim Abdullahi Haji Omar – Vice President of Puntland
- Mohammed Abdullah Hassan – Leader of the Dervish
- Saado Ali Warsame – Singer & MP in the Federal Parliament of Somalia
- Ismail Mire - Somali poet and Dervish movement general
- Ali Dhuh - Somali poet
- Saleban Essa Ahmed 'Xaglatoosiye' - Somaliland Minister of Health & former SSC militia leader
