= Qoriley =

- Town
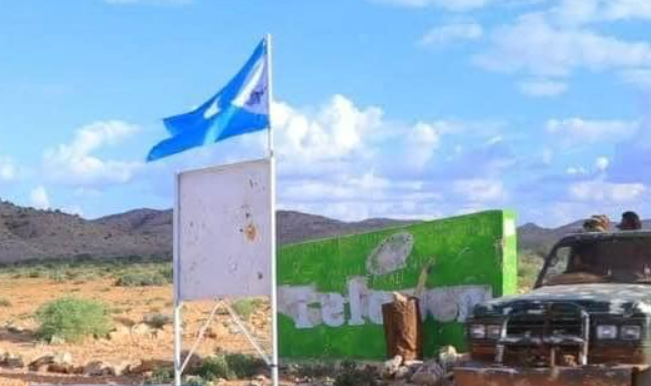

- Location
- Coordinates: 8°00′12.0″N 47°33′51.3″E
- Country: Somalia
- Region: Sool
- District: Las Anod the capital

Population (2019)
  - Total: 3,900
- Time zone: UTC+3 (EAT)

Qoriley is a town in the Sool region of north western Somalia.

== History ==
Relation map.

In 1997, the Baharsame clan in Qoriley and the Omar Mohamoud clan in Magaley were at odds over the construction of a concrete reservoir on suitable grazing land between the two towns, which led to a peace conference led by the Somali Salvation Democratic Front (later the Puntland government).

In May and June 2007, Ethiopian forces expelled residents from villages on the outskirts of the Wardel Zone (now the Dollo Zone) and burned them. Those who left the villages migrated to the central city of Werder, as well as to Walwal, Danood, and Qoriley.

In October 2007, settlement agreement between the Baharsame and Omar Mahmud clans.

In August 2015, fighting broke out in Qoriley. According to witnesses, they were an armed group from Burtinle, Puntland. On September 22, 12 people were killed in the fighting. At the end of September, Vice President Puntland visited Burtinle for mediation. On October 2, Somaliland delegations visited Qoriley to mediate the inter-clan struggle. On October 7, the government of Khatumo State also dispatched a representative.

In late December 2017, fighting broke out between clans in Qoriley. The fighting took place between Qoriley and Gumburka Cagaare of Ethiopia. Fighting occurred at least twice, on December 19 and 23, killing at least 18 people. The two warring clans were the Omar Mahmud branch of the Majeerteen clan and the Baharsame branch of the Dhulbahante clan. Somaliland, Puntland, and Khatumo, who all declare territorial rights to the land, claimed that the fighting was not their fault. The cease-fire was effected through the armed intervention of the governments of those countries, local elders, and the Ethiopian police.

In January 2018, the Somaliland Minister of Information announced that Somali federal government forces had attacked Qoriley and Tukaraq. The Somaliland military used this as a reason to attack the checkpoint in Tukaraq, where Puntland customs officials are stationed. The Battle of Tukaraq resulted in effective Somaliland control of Tukaraq.

In October 2019, the Somaliland government built a health center in Qoriley, and the governor of Sool state and the mayor of Las Anod attended the opening ceremony.
