= Ceegaag =

Ceegaag (Egag)
- Town
- Location in Somalia
- Coordinates: 8°37′7″N 46°29′6″E
- Country: Somalia
- Regional State: Khatumo
- Region: Sool
- District: Buuhoodle
- Time zone: UTC+3 (EAT)

Ceegaag is a town located in the Buuhoodle district of Cayn, Somalia.

It has an elementary, middle, and secondary school. A maternal and infant health center was opened in the town in 2012.

== Demographics ==
The town of Ceegaag is a Darod clan, with the Dhulbahante sub-clan its main inhabitants. the residents are primarily descend from the Hayaag sub-clan of the Dhulbahante.
