= Abdul Majid Hussein =

Ethiopian politician; Permanent representative of Ethiopia to the United Nations

Honorable Abdul Majid Hussein Cabdulmajiid Xuseen عبد المجيد حسين

Minister of Telecommunications and Transport of Ethiopia
- In office 1997–2001
- Prime Minister: Meles Zenawi

Ambassador of Ethiopia to United Nations
- In office 2001–2004
- Prime Minister: Meles Zenawi

Personal details
- Born: June 13, 1944 Dire Dawa, Ethiopian Empire
- Died: March 29, 2004 (aged 59) Dire Dawa, Ethiopia
- Resting place: Diredawa, Ethiopia
- Party: Ethiopian Somali Democratic League
- Other political affiliations: Ethiopian People's Revolutionary Democratic Front

Abdul Majid Hussein (Somali: Cabdulmajiid Xuseen; Arabic: عبد المجيد حسين; Amharic: አብዱልመጂድ ሑሴን) born 1944), also called የማሰብ ችሎታ ያለው አንበሳ (A Lion with thinking abilities), is an Ethiopian politician, who was the Permanent Representative of Ethiopia to the United Nations.He was a senior government economist. In 1997, Abdulmajid was appointed Minister of Telecommunications and Transport of Ethiopia, and he served as Minister of Telecommunications and Transport of Ethiopia from 1997 to 2001. In 2001, he was appointed as the Ethiopian ambassador to the UN, and served as the Permanent Representative of Ethiopia to the United Nations till his death.

== Biography ==
Abdulmajid Hussein was born Dire Dawa, Ethiopia. Hussein belonged to the Habr Awal subclan of the Isaaq, and specifically the Abdale-muse sub-clan. In the 1960s he attended highschool in Harar city, and was schoolmates with former Federal Supreme Court of Ethiopia president Kemal Bedri. In 1992, he was a senior government economist, and worked towards opening the Ethiopian economy to the free market. In 1995, he became the leader of Ethiopian Somali Democratic League (ESDL) party in the Somali Region of Ethiopia, and was the victim of an assassination attempt during turmoils against Somalia's Al-Itihaad al-Islamiya. By 1998, he had served in the government for 7 years, and was serving as Minister of Telecommunications and Transport of Ethiopia. In 2001, he was appointed as the Ethiopian ambassador to the UN, a job he had refused in 1998.

== Dr. Abdulmajid Hussein College of Teachers ==
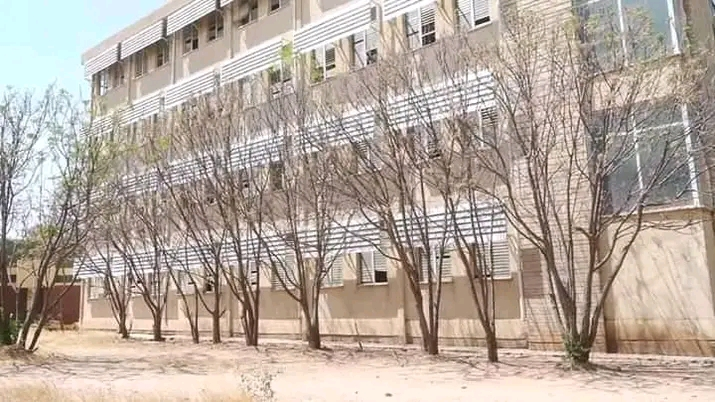
Campus buildings

SRS Dr. Abdulmajid Hussein College of Teachers Education in Jigjiga is named after him. The college was established in 2004. It is one of the largest post-secondary educational and skills training centres for teachers in the region. Since the beginning of establishment of the college 28 batches have graduated.
