= Widhwidh =

Widhwidh وضوود
- Town
- Location in Somalia
- Coordinates: 8.4565°N 46.7068°E
- Country: Somalia
- Regional State: North Eastern State of Somalia
- Region: Togdheer (per Somalia Government); Cayn (per North Eastern State of Somalia)
- District: Buuhoodle District

Population (2019)
  - Total: 4,162
- Time zone: UTC+3 (EAT)
- Area code: +252

Widhwidh, also known as Widh Widh, is a town in the North Eastern State of Somalia's Buuhoodle District of northeastern Somalia. The Federal Government of Somalia announced in 2025 that the North Eastern State had completed its state-formation process and forms part of Somalia’s federal structure; within that framework, Widhwidh (in Buuhoodle District) is placed in the Cayn (Ayn) area of the state.

== Overview ==
The settlement is located 50 kilometres (31 mi) by road from Buuhoodle.

The district was part of the 2010 Ayn clashes on 19 July 2010.

Relation map. (The area adjacent to Widhwidh is the Sool region.)

== Demographics ==
The town is inhabited by lineages belonging to the Barkad, a major sub-clan of the Farah Garad branch of the Dhulbahante clan. On October 10, clan chiefs, intellectuals and the diaspora community from the Barkad sub-clan held a meeting in the Widh Widh District and voiced support for the Khatumo II Conference to be held in the Taleex District.

=== Population since 2020 ===
As of 2025, no official post-2019 settlement-level population figure for Widhwidh has been published by Somali federal or regional authorities or by UN statistical releases; the latest available cited figure remains the 2019 Care Smart survey (4,162). However, humanitarian reporting identified Widhwidh as a locality receiving IDPs during the 2023 Las Anod crisis, which may have temporarily increased the resident population without producing an official revised total.

== History ==
=== Early period ===
In 1921, Widhwidh was one of many foreign cities.

=== Somaliland and SSC ===
In May 2010, fighting broke out between the Darod-dominated armed group HBM-SSC and the Somaliland forces. On June 13, Somaliland's Foreign Minister described HBM-SSC as a "terrorist group" and said it was responsible for the violence in Buuhoodle and Widhwidh. On June 26, fighting broke out between Somaliland forces and anti-Somaliland forces in Kalabaydh and Widhwidh. Another battle took place in Widhwidh in July. Residents were evacuated to neighboring towns. In August, the elders of Togdheer and Buuhoodle jointly proposed a settlement. However, Somaliland government rejected the proposal, saying that it respects the will of the council of elders, but that the strategy of the Somaliland forces is a full-time matter for the Somaliland government. In 2011, HBM-SSC collapsed due to internal divisions, paving the way for subsequent Dhulbahante political reorganizations. In 2011 a peace conference was held in the town between the local community and the Somaliland government.

=== Somaliland and Khatumo ===
Khatumo State was proclaimed in 2012 by Dhulbahante actors as a regional administration claiming parts of Sool, Sanaag and Cayn, distinct from both Somaliland and Puntland.

In February 2014, Ethiopian forces and Somaliland government arrested Al-Shabaab officials near Widhwidh. The Somaliland government had agreed in a pact to the capture of criminals by Ethiopia in areas under its own control.

In July 2015, Somaliland forces, which had been in retreat for some time now, drove out Khatumo State forces stationed in Widhwidh.

In April 2016, the Somaliland forces sent 25 new military vehicles to Widhwidh to counter Khatumo State forces.

In July 2016, Widhwidh elders demanded the withdrawal of Somaliland troops on the occasion of the funeral of recently deceased Swedish Chief Garaad Abshir Saalax in Widhwidh, as the funeral could also attract anti-Somalilanders. In the same month, a meeting was held to determine Garaad Abshir Saalax's successor.

Since the end of 2016, the idea of merging Khatumo State into Somaliland took shape; in February 2017, the Khatumo State installed a well in Widhwidh, using funds from Somaliland's telecommunications company Telesom.

In September 2019, a mother and child care hospital was established in Widhwidh district, funded by the overseas Diaspora.

In January 2020, a mysterious epidemic killed 12 children in the Widhwidh district. After investigating the cause, the Somaliland Ministry of Health announced that this was a simultaneous outbreak of three diseases: pneumonia, fever, and diarrhea, and that the problem had been resolved.

In June–July 2020, a clash between the Hayaag (of the Dhulbahante) in Buuhoodle and the Reer Hagar (of the Dhulbahante) in WidhWidh.

In August 2020, envoys from the clans living in Buuhoodle and Ceegaag visited the Widhwidh district and held a meeting to end the war between the two clans.

In October 2020, road construction began connecting Tuulo Smakaab, Widhwidh and Goonle was started. Tuulo Smakaab is located in the middle of the main road that passes through the center of Somaliland and the Sool region, and when completed, this road will provide convenient transportation from the center of Somaliland to the district of Buuhoodle.

In June 2021, a mayoral election for Buhoodle District in Somaliland was held in Widhwidh, and Khadiija Ahmed Yusuf of the Kulmiye Party as mayor and Mustafe Cabdi Ayaanle of the Waddani Party as deputy mayor was elected. But Buuhoodle city did not participate in this election. Khadija Ahmed Yusuf is the first woman elected mayor in the history of Somaliland.

In March 2022, the district administration in Widhwidh launched a third phase of emergency water-trucking to respond to severe drought conditions affecting the area. In December 2022, a Somaliland MP publicly commended the Presidency for initiating a borehole (riig biyood) project in Widhwidh to address chronic water shortages.

=== North Eastern State of Somalia ===
Following the outbreak of large-scale fighting around Las Anod in early 2023, humanitarian partners and authorities identified Widhwidh among the localities receiving internally displaced persons (IDPs). Drought impacts around Widhwidh were also recorded by Radio Ergo’s community feedback in March 2023.

On 19 October 2023, the Federal Government of Somalia announced recognition of SSC-Khaatumo as an interim local administration for the Sool, Sanaag and Cayn areas; Widhwidh lies within this area. In December 2023, SSC-Khaatumo leadership publicly visited health facilities in Widhwidh, including Kalkaal Maternity Hospital.

As part of government outreach during the 2023 conflict period, the Federal Minister for Posts and Telecommunications visited Widhwidh General Hospital in May 2023, meeting staff treating wounded fighters and civilians. In late 2024, Somali National Television (SNTV) reported that Kalkaal Hospital in Widhwidh had begun conducting advanced surgeries that previously required referrals abroad, indicating a scale-up of services at the facility. The NGO operating the facility describes its mission and footprint in rural Sool/Sanaag/Cayn on its official site.

== See also ==
- Administrative divisions of Somaliland
- Regions of Somaliland
- Districts of Somaliland
- Somalia–Somaliland border
