= Buhoodle District =

Buhoodle District Degmada Buuhoodle
- District
- Location of Buuhoodle district of Cayn, Somaliland
- Country: Somaliland
- Capital: Buuhoodle

Population (2014)
  - Total: 217,836
- Time zone: UTC+3 (EAT)

Buhoodle District (Somali: Degmada Buuhoodle) is a district in the Buuhoodle region of Somaliland. Its district capital is Buuhoodle.

== Demographics ==
The district is inhabited by the Habar Jeclo & Dhulbahante clan divisions. Lineages that include, The Farah Garad: Ahmed Garad and Barkad, who are well represented, as well as the Ali Garad and Yasin Garad. the Baho Nugaaled: Khalid, Yahya, Hayaag, Mohamed Muse and the Abokor Muse are the well represented. The Mohamoud Garad: the Jama Siad sub-lingeages who live amongst the aforementioned sub clans.

== See also ==
- Administrative divisions of Somaliland
- Regions of Somaliland
- Districts of Somaliland
- Somalia–Somaliland border
