= Sool =

Region of Somalia

Coordinates: 8°23′46″N 47°41′29″E

Sool Sool, (Osmanya Script): 𐒈𐒝𐒐 (Somali) صول (Arabic)
- Region
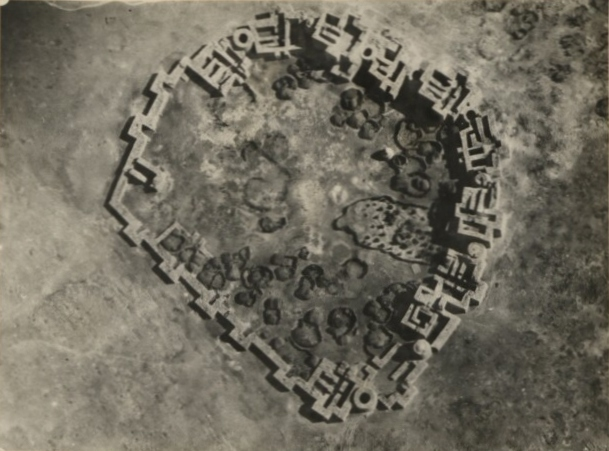
- Dervish fort in Taleh

- Location in Somalia

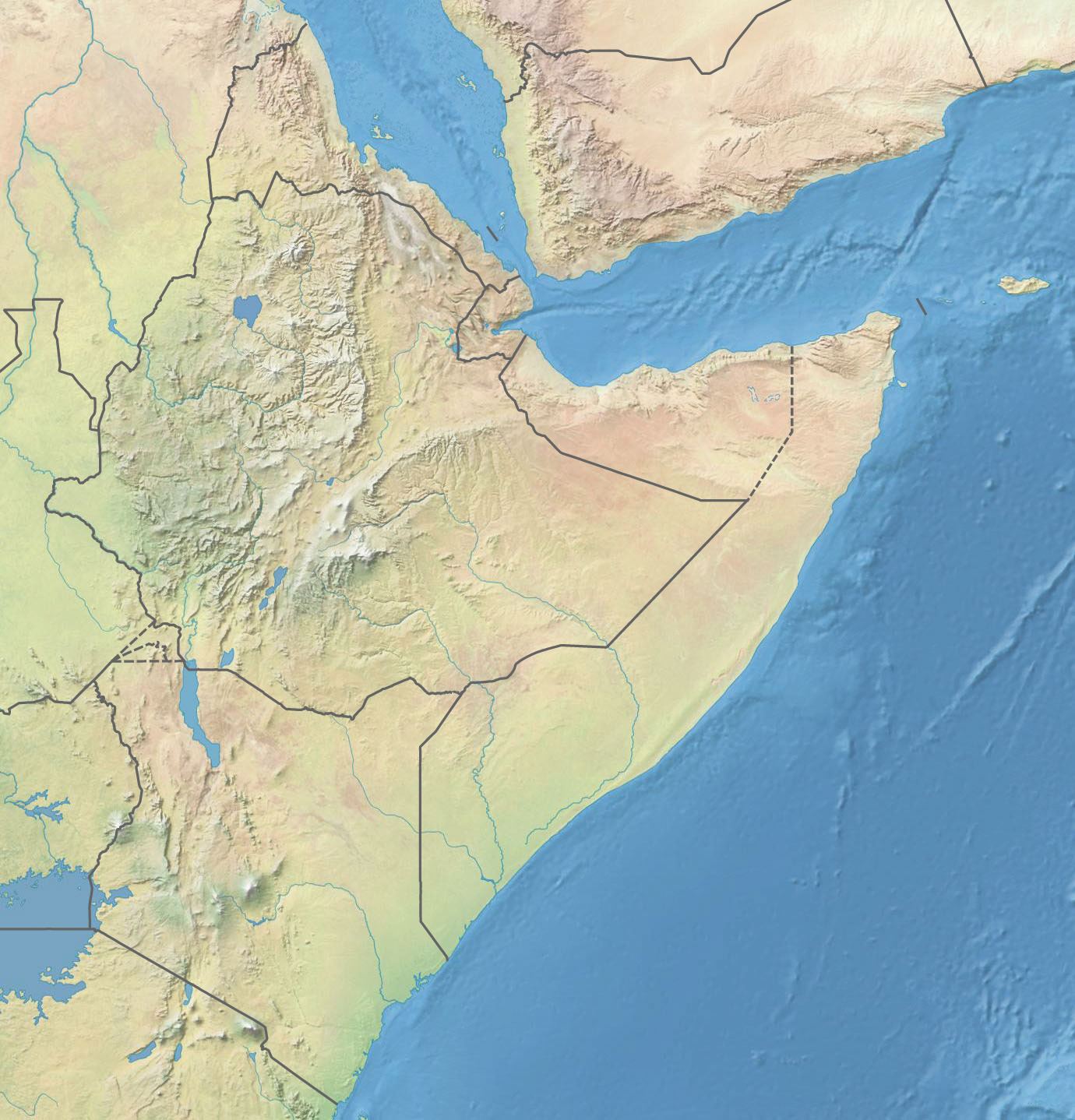
- Location within Somalia Location within the Horn of Africa Location within Africa
- Country: Somaliland (partial control up to Oog) Somalia (mostly controlled)
- Administrative centre: Las Anod

Government
  - Governor (disputed): Osman Fiidyow

Area
  - Total: 32,629 km^{2} (12,598 sq mi)

Population (2019)
  - Total: 618,600
  - Density: 18.96/km^{2} (49.10/sq mi)
- Time zone: UTC+3 (EAT)
- ISO 3166 code: SO-SO
- HDI (2021): 0.338 low · 8th of 18

Sool (Somali: Sool, Arabic: صول) is an administrative region (gobol). It borders Togdheer to the west, Sanaag to the north, Ethiopia to the south, and Nugal and Bari to the east. Its capital city is Las Anod. The region is disputed by the self-declared Republic of Somaliland and the North Eastern State (SSC-Khatumo), where the North Eastern State controls the majority up to the city of Guumays, Oog where the Aynabo district starts and is governed by Somaliland. Puntland also claims the region, but has not demonstrated their supposed control.

== History ==
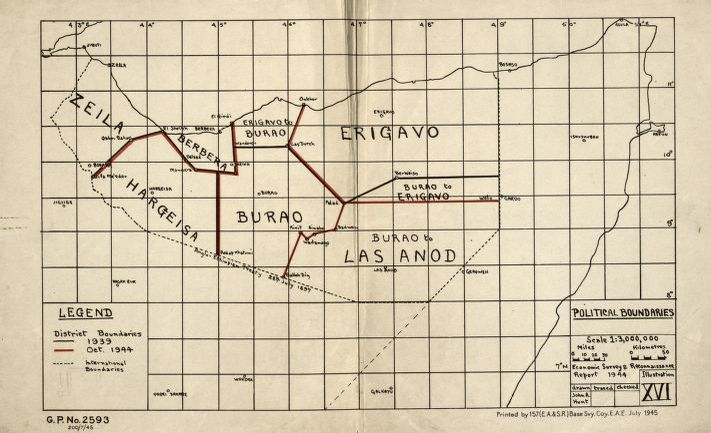
British Somaliland district boundaries from 1944.

From 1944 to 1974, the Sool region was formerly Las Anod district. It was one of three districts under British protection. The other two districts were the Burao and Hargeysa districts.

In 1974 most Sool was part of the larger Nugal region, with its capital at Garowe. It was established as a separate region in 1984 with its capital at Las Anod.

=== Las Anod conflict ===
Due to the prolonged conflict between Somaliland and Puntland, many Dhulbahante and Warsangeli living in the region did not recognize the Sool region and eastern Sanaag, as either Somaliland or Puntland. On 5 January 2023, Somaliland forces withdrew from Las Anod after mass civil unrest in the city. On October 19, the government of Somalia recognized the state of SSC-Khaatumo as a federal member. Since the defeat of Somaliland troops in the base in Goojacde, much of Sool has been under the control of SSC-Khatumo.

== Demographics ==
Cities, towns and villages in Sool.

The Eastern part of the Sool region is almost exclusively inhabited by Dhulbahante. Michael Walls reports:

"The residents of Sool overwhelmingly hail from a single clan grouping in the form of the Dhulbahante [...]. Sool boasts a degree of kinship homogeneity that is rare even in the Somali Horn".

The Habr Je'lo clan of the Isaaq clan-family make up the vast majority of the population in western Sool, including the region's second largest town Aynaba, as well as the wider Aynaba District.

The Habr Yunis sub-division of the Garhajis Isaaq also inhabit the western parts of Hudun and Las Anod districts in northern Sool.

The Dhulbahante sub-division of the Harti Darod clan primarily inhabits the Taleh, eastern Hudun and Las Anod districts in eastern Sool. The Fiqishini sub-clan of the Habar Gidir Hawiye integrated into Baho Nugaaled Dhulbahante, inhabit the area around Adhi'adeye as well as fiqishini.

== Districts ==
The Sool region consists of 4 districts: Aynabo District, Las Anod District, Taleh District, Hudun District.

== Villages ==
- Baran
- Buqdarkayn
- Darantaleh
- Higlo
- Karindabaylweyn

== Maps ==
Detailed map

Military situation in Somalia and Somaliland as of December 2024

== See also ==
- Administrative divisions of Somaliland
- Regions of Somaliland
- Districts of Somaliland
- Somalia–Somaliland border
