= Abdul Nasser =

Abdul Nasser (Arabic: عبد الناصر) is a male Muslim given name, and in modern usage, surname. It is built from the Arabic words Abd, al- and Nasser. The name means "servant of the Helper", An-Nasser being a Muslim theophoric name.

The letter a of the al- is unstressed, and can be transliterated by almost any vowel, often by u. The short "u" is taken from the classical Arabic nominative case ending, whereby the first element of the name is "'Abdu". Because the letter n is a sun letter, the letter l of the al- can be assimilated to it. Thus, although the name is written in Arabic with letters corresponding to Abd al-Nasser, the pronunciation can correspond to Abd an-Nasser. Alternative transliterations of the last element include Naaser, Nasir and others, with the whole name subject to variable spacing and hyphenation.

It may refer to:

- Gamal Abdel Nasser (1918–1970), president of Egypt
  - Khalid Abdel Nasser (1949–2011), his son, activist
- Abdul Nasser Bani Hani (died 2013), Jordanian politician
- Abdonnaser Hemmati (born 1956), Iranian Politician
- Abdinasir Haji Ahmed (1957-2022) Somali cleric and Islamic preacher for Dawah
- Abdul Nacer Benbrika (born c. 1960), Algerian-Australian Muslim activist
- Abd Al Nasir Mohammed Abd Al Qadir Khantumani (born 1960), Syrian held in Guantanamo Bay
- Abdel Nasser Tawfik (born 1967), Egyptian physicist
- Abdelnasser Ouadah (born 1975), Algerian footballer
- Abdulnaser Slil (born 1981), Libyan footballer
- Abdul Nasir (Guantanamo detainee 874) (born 1981), Afghan
- Abdoul Nassirou Omouroun (born 1987), Togolese footballer
- Abdinasir Said Ibrahim (born 1989), Somali athlete
- Abd Al Naser Hasan (born 1990), Syrian footballer
- Abd al-Nasir al-Janabi, Iraqi politician
- Abdul Nasir (cricketer, born 1983), Pakistani cricketer
- Abdul Nasir (cricketer, born 1998), Pakistani cricketer
- Abdul Nasir bin Amer Hamsah, a Malay Singaporean who was sentenced to a total of 38 years in jail for his involvement in the 1994 Oriental Hotel Murder and the kidnapping of two police officers in 1996.
- Khalil Mamut (born 1977), Uyghur refugee imprisoned at Guantanamo Bay, also known as Abdul Nasser
- Abdel Nasser El-Gohary (born 1970), Egyptian poet
- Abdel Nasser Ould Ethmane, founding member of SOS Slaves
- Abdel Nasser Barakat (born 1974), Palestinian football manager
- Abdul Nasser Qardash, Iraqi militant
- Abdulnasser Al-Obaidly (born 1972), Qatari footballer
- Abdul Nasser El Hakim (born 1960), Curaçaoan businessman and politician
- Abdul Nasser Al-Sayegh (born 1959), Kuwaiti fencer
- Abdul Nazer Mahdani (born 1966), Indian politician
- Abdulnasser Mugali, Yemeni poet and writer
- Abdinasir Ali Hassan, Somali Kenyan entrepreneur
- Muhammad Abdul Nasir, Indian politician
- Abdelnasser Rashid, American politician
