= Abdulkadir Nur Farah =

Somali Cleric was assassinated by Al-Shabab 2013

His Excellency Sheikh Sheikh Abdulkadir Nur Farah Dr.
- Shiikh Cabdulqaadir Nuur Faarax شيخ عبد القادر نور فارح
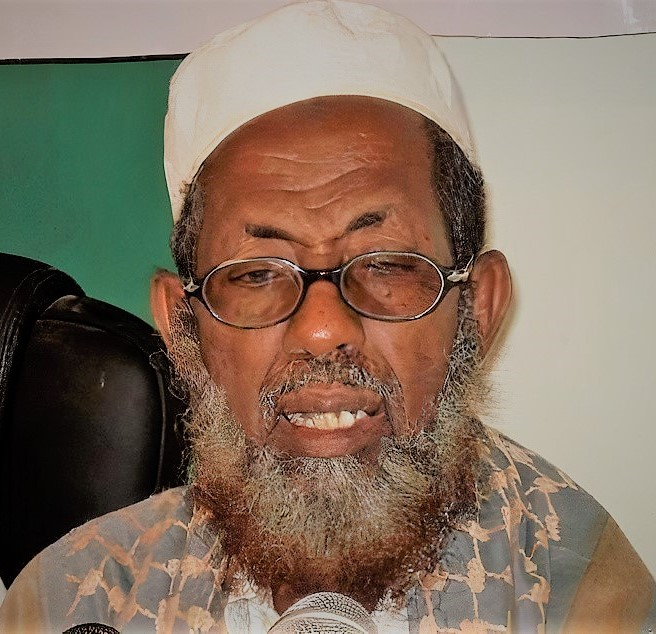

Personal details
- Born: 1940 Eyl, Somalia
- Died: 15 February 2013 Garowe, Somalia
- Cause of death: Assassinated by Al-Shabab
- Party: Al-islah; Aljamaeat al'iislamia Harakat Al-Ahli; Al-Itihaad al-Islamiya (1985—1996); Jama'at al-I'tisam (1996—2013)
- Education: Islamic University of Madinah

Sheikh Abdulkadir Nur Farah or Sheikh Abdul Qadir Nour Farah (Somali: Shiikh Cabdulqaadir Nuur Faarax; 1940–15 February 2013, Arabic: الشيخ عبدالقادر نور فارح) was a Somali cleric, preacher, and Islamic scholar of Dawah. He was assassinated by Al-Shabab in Garowe on 15 February 2013.

== Early and education ==
Sheikh Abdulkadir Nur Farah was born in the Canjeel Teelawaa in 1940, nearly the town of Eyl in the Nugal region of Puntland, Somalia.

Sheikh Abdulkadir, as recounted in his memoirs compiled by Tutor Judge Mohammed Omar, states:

At my birth, during the outbreak of the Second World War around 1940, I entered the world in a place called 'Canjeel Teelawaa,' near Eyl, under the rule of Mohamed Abdullah Hassan, the leader of the Dervish movement. My father, Nur Farah, was present during my upbringing. Unfortunately, he passed away when I was twenty-one. He wasn't the one who imparted life hacks to me, and we were a financially struggling family. Our possessions were limited to a small herd of sheep.

He has been devoted to Islamic knowledge since his early years, despite the challenges of pursuing education while also tending to the family's sheep. He moved to the town of Eyl to receive primary education and later traveled to the Somali capital, Mogadishu, in 1960. There, he joined a school affiliated with Al-Azhar Sharif, where he acquired Islamic sciences, graduating in 1967. Following that, he moved to the Saudi Arabia to enroll in the Institute of Islamic Solidarity. Sheikh Abdulkadir quoted again in his memoir:

Since my early childhood, I was imbued with a desire of knowledge and religion, and my mother noticed this. When a cleric visited us in our home - and I was only seven or six years old at the time - I would sit with him and listen to what he said and read with interest and listening. When she saw this keenness on my part, She said: Oh my Lord, if my son had learned, I would call him Sheikh Abdulqadir - she meant Sheikh Abdulqadir Al-Jilani.

Despite my passion for knowledge, I faced challenges in seeking it. At the age of 13, I had not yet begun to learn the Arabic alphabet. My desire to seek knowledge grew stronger, and when I reached 13 years of age, I took a wooden tablet and a pencil that I sharpened from wood through my personal efforts. Unfortunately, I did not find a teacher to help me memorize the Qur’an, especially since my family led a nomadic lifestyle.

Despite my passion for knowledge, I lost the means to pursue it. By the age of 13, I hadn't even started learning the alphabet. My desire to seek knowledge grew, and at the age of 13, I took a wooden board and a pen that I crafted from wood with my personal effort. Unfortunately, I couldn't find a teacher to help me memorize the Quran, especially since my family lived in a nomadic setting.

== Career and Dawah ==
Sheikh Abdulkadir joined the Islamic University of Medina, Saudi Arabia, in the early 1970s, in 1975 he studied from the Faculty of Dawah and Asciddin, and After graduating, he was appointed as a dawah cleric and sent to West Africa with Sheikh Yusuf Adam. After a period that coincided with President Mohamed Siad Barre's visits to Africa in the mid-1970s, he persuaded the Sheikhs that the country needed them and brought them to Somalia, where they were served as two judges.

Sheikh Abdulkadir quoted in his memoir:

Immediately after graduating from the Islamic University in mid-1974 AD, the Fatwa Presidency assigned my lifelong friend Sheikh Yusuf and me to preach in Niger. Initially, the Nigerian president rejected our presence, deemed our entry illegal, and ordered our immediate expulsion. However, the Saudi government intervened through one of its African embassies. We stayed there for approximately two months, hosted by the religious attaché at the Saudi embassy in Niger. Meanwhile, Muhammad Siad Barre, the head of the Organization of African Unity, was touring many African countries—about 14 countries, at least. When he arrived in Niger, we visited him, and he asked, 'Do you want to stay in Niger or return to Somalia?' We expressed our desire to return to our country. After returning to Mogadishu, I worked in a court for five months after completing a training course.

Sheikh Abdulkadir Nur Farah was actively engaging Dawah, and was known for his jurisprudence in scientific seminars in mosques.

When we returned from the Islamic University in late 1974, my colleague Sheikh Abdullah Mahmoud Issa began giving lessons from the book 'Riyadh Al-Salehin' at the Al-Maqam Mosque. The lessons stopped, so I continued them. Later, I started teaching 'Terminology of Hadith.' This might be one of the first books on terminology taught in Somalia, selected from the curricula of institutes affiliated with the Islamic University.

During my teaching episodes, I covered another book on the principles of jurisprudence. Unfortunately, the book wasn't available to the students, so I had to dictate it to them and then provide explanations. Alhamdulillah, I succeeded in effectively conveying the information to their minds. Students understood and benefited.

At a later time, I met Sheikh Mustafa Ismail Harun, a renowned preacher, during one of the Hajj seasons. He informed me that he was among the group to whom I taught the two mentioned books, 'Principles of Islamic Jurisprudence' and 'Terminology of Hadith.' He mentioned that after moving to Burao in northern Somalia, he taught the two books 13 times. He also noted that 'Principles of Islamic Jurisprudence,' for which Sheikh Abdul Karim Hassan Housh (a prominent Usuli figure in the city of Burao in northern Somalia) was known, had its roots in the treatise 'Usul' that I had taught.

== Prison ==
Siad Barre's regime arrested several Ulama after the killing of clerics who opposed the Personal Status Law, sparking much controversy. Among those arrested was Sheikh Abdul Qadir, who remained in prison for two years without a court trial.

Sheikh Abdulkadir said in his memoirs::

There were notorious prisons established by the regime to incarcerate political opponents and public figures, located on the road between the cities of Marka and Afgooye for over two years. In October 1978, we were released. The days of imprisonment were challenging, yet our conviction remained unwavering, and our determination did not falter. During my time in prison, I conducted lessons in interpretation, Nahwa, and biography. Most detainees were political figures and former statesmen. The government arrested numerous young people, bringing them together, while many preachers managed to escape. I recall individuals such as Abdul Qadir Sheikh Mahmoud, the head of the Al-Ahl movement, and Abdul Qadir Ghari, among others, who fled towards Kenya and later moved to Saudi Arabia. There, they joined universities and were warmly welcomed by Saudi Arabia, which understood the plight of Somali scholars and Ulama under the brutal communist regime.

== Islamic Movement in Somalia ==
Sheikh Abdul Kadir is one of the prominent pioneers of the Islamic movements in Somalia. He was a member of the family movement that engaged in clandestine activities during the communist regime of Somalia, initiated by Sheikh Mohamed Moallim Hassan's episodes. However, the movement faced severe disruption after the arrest of prominent scholars in 1975, leading to the emergence of a Takfiri stream.

Sheikh Abdulkadir Nur Farah quoted:

The killing of scholars at the beginning of 1975 marked a blatant war against preaching in general. The regime's suspicions towards preachers increased, intensifying the campaign of arrests under various flimsy excuses. This compelled (Al-Ahli) to continue secret work and protect themselves before their names appeared on the list. During our arrest in 1977, the idea spread. Takfir was forcefully advocated by some who had escaped arrest and returned, determined to propagate it. They took advantage of the absence of scholars from the scene, either in prison or in exile, creating an empty atmosphere for them. Upon my release from prison, Takfir had gained control of the scene.

After Sheikh Abdulkadir Nur Farah was released from prison, he was offered the opportunity to join the Al-Islamiya community established by some dissidents of the Al-Ahli Movement

The founding of the Al-Islah and Al-Jama 'a movements was almost simultaneous, Jama' a Al-Islamiya was an extension of the Al-Ahl movement, and its ruins were founded after its prince, Abdul Qadir, deviated and embraced Takfiri thought, and this was close to the days of our release from prison, Sheikh Yusuf and I were ostensibly numbered among the men of Al-Ahly, when we resolved to fight against the takfiri thought, and later, Abdulaziz Farah and Mohamed Abdi Dahir came to us and told us that there was a group that had formed, offering us to join the fledgling movement.

Sheikh Abdulkadir also co-founded Al-Itihaad al-Islamiya in 1984, which originated from the Jemaah Islamiya coalition in southern Somalia and Unity in northern Somalia. Sheikh Ali Warsame was selected as the movement's head.

I personally know Sheikh Ali Warsame on a personal level since we were classmates, and our fellowship was formed during our days of study at the Islamic University. Warsame appears to be a consensus figure accepted by both the northern and southern Somali communities, as he is trusted by all. I had the opportunity to meet him in Mecca, where we participated in preliminary integration discussions. Many individuals, including Abdulkader Mohamed Abdullah, Abdelkader Garre, and Dr. Ahmad Haji Abdirahman, were part of these discussions and others.

After the collapse of the Central Government of Somalia in 1991, Islamist groups persisted in their demand for Sharia Law, advocating for its implementation in all aspects. Al-Itihad Al-Islam (Salafism) expressed a keen interest in establishing military camps and Islamic courts to govern Somali regions. This pursuit led to conflicts with Somali warlords.

Since the establishment of the Al-Etihad Al-Islami Group in Somalia, its main stated objective has been to pursue the establishment of an Islamic State. And when the regime fell, When the regime fell, it facilitated the acquisition of weapons and the State that prevented the arms from reaching our hands fell, there was nothing to justify that devastating war but miscalculation of the nature of things, poor political perception of reality, and when you are dominated by illusions you lose the right perception of things and hide your real weight.

In the circumstances of wars that followed temporary control of a number of areas in Somalia, most notably the city of Bosaso, the capital province of Bari, and after the subsequent pursuit of the President of Puntland, Abdullahi Yusuf Ahmed, narrowed the clampdown on the Al-Itihaad al-Islamiya Movement, inflicted successive defeats on the Movement's leaders, gathered and declared the status of arms and demobilized combatants.

At the beginning, we faced overwhelming defeat, nearly pushed to the crushed courtyard of Garowe's battles, and the camps, once filled with men, now stood vacant. However, we emerged victorious in the final round of the war. Upon relocating to the Slate of Las Qorey, community leaders engaged in numerous consultations and deliberations about the future.

The plan was to staunchly defend with all available strength, avoiding succumbing to the enemy's onslaught. Simultaneously, if successful in defense, we aimed to prevent expansion and persist in the fight. This decision and vision held sovereignty, despite disagreements from some. The situation demanded unwavering opinions and resolutions, even from a purely legitimate perspective.

The war yielded no beneficial outcomes, necessitating a change. In fact, our inclination was towards peace and impactful reconciliation, avoiding defeat on the ground. However, considering the advocacy's interest, societal concerns, and rectifying the initial mistake, the transformation imposed significant hardships and difficulties upon us.

After that, Sheikh Abdulqadir Nur Farah participated in founding of the group (Jama'at Al-Itisam) in 1996, and he continued his advocacy efforts in the Garowe, in particular Puntland, Somalia. He was among those who participated in the founding of the East Africa University and also served as chairman of the board of trustees. After the assassination of Dr. Ahmed Haji Abdirahman in 2011.

== Assassinations ==
On February 15, 2013, Sheikh Abdulkadir was assassinated while performing the Al-Asr prayer at Al-Badar Mosque in Garowe, Somalia. The assassination was perpetrated by the Al-Shabaab terrorist group, which had been sending threatening SMS messages indicating their intent to kill him. On July 23, 2013, Puntland Forces executed Abdirahman Hussein Jama Bile and Abdullahi Osman Ahmed 'Aynte' by firing squad for the assassination of Sheikh Abdulqadir. Both individuals were sentenced to death by the Puntland Military Court, with Bile identified as the assailant who killed Sheikh Abdulkadir Nur Farah, and Aynte as the organizer of the act of terrorism. Aynte had fled to Las Anod, but was later brought back to Puntland. This incident followed the assassination of Sheikh Dr. Ahmed Haji Abdirahman, who was also killed after the Fajr prayer at Al-Rawda Mosque in Bosaso on December 4, 2011.

Sheikh Abdulkadir Nur Farah says about Al-Shabaab Militant:

The jihad, carried under the banner of those who identified themselves as 'young Mujahideen,' seemed to be directed towards Muslims. They perpetrated numerous assassinations and bombings that claimed the lives of hundreds of Muslims. They rejoiced in this, thanking God who enabled them! Many people were killed in Bosaso, Mogadishu, Garowe, and Galkayo—all of them Muslims. Most of them lost their lives on the doorsteps of mosques. Among the latest victims was Dr. Ahmed Haji Abdirahman.

Sheikh Abdulkadir Nur Farah was buried in Garoowe, and his funeral was attended by a large number of citizens، Many entities and institutions condemned the assassination of the sheikh, most notably the Jama'at Al-itisam group The Somali Scholars Association The International Union of Muslim Scholars, and the United Nations The perpetrator of the assassination was arrested and executed, and another young man with whom he participated in the crime was sentenced to death by the military station in Puntland.

=== Reactions ===
President of Puntland Abdirahman Farole called the assassinatiin as act of terrorism, officials Federal Government of Somalia attended the funeral.

Hassan Dahir Aweys, the founder and leader of Hizbul Islam denied his group's involvement in the assassination of Sheikh Abdulkadir Nur Farah, according to Garowe Online on February 18. Aweys spoke on Somalia Channel, saying, "We decided to deny any responsibility in Sheikh Abdulkadir's killing." He also expressed his condolences to Sheikh's family.

== See also ==
- Sheikh Ali Warsame
- Ahmed Haji Abdirahman
- Abdinasir Haji Ahmed
- Abdulqadir Mohamed Abdullahi
- Bashir Ahmed Salad
