= Jama'at al-I'tisam =

Somali Islamic Salafi organization and missionary group

- Somali: Jamaacada Al-Ictisaam Bil Kitaabi Wassunnah; Arabic: جماعة الاعتصام بالكتاب والسنة
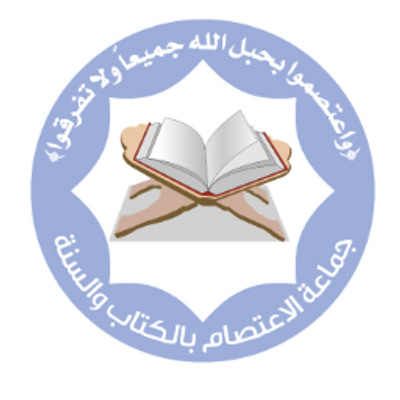
- Formation: 1996; 30 years ago
- Founder: Ali Warsame
- Founded at: Las Anod, Somalia
- Type: Religious organisation, NGO
- Legal status: Active
- Purpose: Promote Salafi teachings and societal reform
- Origins: Al-Ittihaad Al-Islami
- Region served: East Africa
- Official languages: Somali, Arabic
- Leader: Bashir Ahmed Salad
- Website: www.ictisaam.net

Jama'atu al-I'tisam bil-Kitab wa’l-Sunnah (Somali: Jamaacada Al-Ictisaam Bil Kitaabi Wassunnah, Arabic: جماعة الاعتصام بالكتاب والسنة), more commonly known as Jama'at Al-I'tisam (Somali: Jamaacada Al-Ictisaam, Arabic: جماعة الاعتصام) is a Somali Islamic Salafi organization and missionary group founded in 1996. The organization emerged from the merger of two previous movements: Al-Ittihad al-Islami, established in 1983, and the Islamic Salvation Movement (Al-Tajammu' al-Islami lil-Inqadh), founded in 1993. It is considered one of the largest Islamic movements in East Africa, known for its comprehensive reformist approach. The group aligns itself with Salafi methodology in theology and reasoning, incorporating da’wah (Islamic preaching), reform, and social transformation into its mission.

Prominent scholars like Sheikh Ali Warsame, Sheikh Mohamed Abdi Umal, Dr Ahmed Haji Abdirahman (who was assassinated by the Al-Shabab in 2011), Sheikh Mohamoud Shibli, and Sheikh Abdulkhadir Nur Farah (also assassinated by Al-Shabab in 2013) are considered the top figures of Jama'at al-I'tisam.

== Background ==
=== Early formation ===
Jama'at al-I'tisam traces its roots to the Islamic Union (Al-Ittihad al-Islami), which emerged in southern Somalia in 1983. Following the collapse of the Somali government in 1991, the Islamic Union adopted armed resistance to establish an Islamic system. This led to the United States and its allies designating the group as a terrorist organization. Over five years, Al-Ittihad expanded its presence across Somalia, setting up camps in the south, north, and central regions. However, its militant activities faced opposition from various factions, particularly the Somali Salvation Democratic Front (SSDF) led by Colonel Abdullahi Yusuf Ahmed. Ethiopian forces also intervened militarily to neutralize Al-Ittihad, dealing significant defeats to the group, including the loss of its stronghold in Gedo.

=== Transition and reformation ===
After a series of military setbacks, key leaders of Al-Ittihad called for disarmament, the dissolution of military camps, and a focus on civil life. While some members transitioned into jihadist factions, others adopted a more peaceful approach to advocacy and societal engagement.

Sheikh Abd al-Qadir Nur Farah, a former leader of Al-Ittihad, explained:

When we considered the future of our people, Islam, and our nation, we decided to disband our forces. This decision, though difficult, allowed us to integrate into society and focus on da’wah. We believed in reconciliation and saw this as necessary for the greater good of the community.

In 1996, Al-Ittihad underwent significant restructuring. After dialogue with the Islamic Salvation Movement, a formal unification agreement was reached in Las Anod. This marked the birth of Jama'at al-I'tisam bi’l-Kitab wa’l-Sunnah.

== Mission and ideology ==
Jama'at al-I'tisam identifies itself as:

The natural extension and true inheritor of the Islamic revival in Somalia, which has spanned over half a century. It is a da’wah-oriented group committed to spreading monotheism, the Sunnah, and achieving comprehensive Islamic life through Salafi principles.

The group emphasizes the Qur'an and Sunnah as understood by the pious predecessors (Salaf al-Salih) and actively promotes Islamic education, charity, and social reform.

=== Community engagement and institutions ===
Since the late 1990s, Jama'at al-I'tisam has emphasized civil society engagement. Its contributions include founding the East Africa University in Bosaso in 1998, establishing the Somali Association of Shari’ah Institutes in 2011 and launching the Higher Institute of Islamic Sciences in Hargeisa, Somaliland in 2014. Jama'at al-I'tisam has also launched charitable organizations like the Al-Minhaaj Foundation for Da’wah and Development, and has also mediated tribal conflicts, fostering reconciliation in Somalia.

The group has also developed positive relationships with Somali governments and administrations. Members of Jama'at al-I'tisam have held ministerial positions in the Somali Federal Government, Somaliland government and Puntland regional government, as well as having served in parliamentary roles.

== Conflict with Al-Shabaab ==
Jama'at al-I'tisam has faced violent opposition from Al-Shabaab, which accuses the group of allying with secularists and the Somali government. Leaders of Jama'at al-I'tisam have repeatedly called on Al-Shabaab to renounce violence and engage in dialogue. However, Al-Shabaab has responded with assassinations and threats against Jama'at al-I'tisam figures, including the assassination of Ahmed Haji Abd al-Rahman in 2011, Abdulkadir Nur Farah in 2013, and Abdinasir Haji Ahmed in 2022.

== Criticism ==
Over the years, Jama'at al-I'tisam has faced criticism from various ideological factions. Al-Shabaab accuses the group of abandoning jihad and collaborating with secular entities, critics of Salafism label the group as overly rigid and accused them of practicing takfir (excommunication),، while secular opponents claim the group harbors ambitions of political dominance. Jama'at al-I'tisam has consistently denied these allegations, maintaining that its goals are purely Islamic and community-focused.

== See also ==
- Ali Warsame
