= Slavery in Mauritania =

Slavery has been called "deeply rooted" in the structure of the northwest African country of Mauritania and estimated to be "closely tied" to the ethnic composition of the country, although it has also been estimated that "Widespread slavery was traditional among ethnic groups of the largely nonpastoralist south, where it had no racial origins or overtones; masters and slaves alike were black", despite the cessation of slavery across other African countries and an official ban on the practice since 1905.

The French colonial administration declared an end to slavery in Mauritania in 1905, but did little to enforce that ban. Mauritania ratified in 1961 the Forced Labour Convention, having already enshrined abolition of slavery, albeit implicitly, in its 1959 constitution. In 1981, Mauritania became the last country in the world to officially abolish slavery, when a presidential decree abolished the practice. However, no criminal laws were passed to enforce the ban. In 2007, under international pressure, the government passed a law allowing slaveholders to be prosecuted.

Despite the official abolition of slavery, the 2018 Global Slavery Index estimated the number of slaves as 90,000 (or 2.1% of the population), a reduction from the 155,600 reported in the 2014 index in which Mauritania ranked 31st of 167 countries by total number of slaves and first by prevalence, with 4% of the population. The Mauritanian government ranks 121st of 167 in its response to all forms of modern slavery. In 2017, the BBC claimed that a total of 600,000 were living in slavery.

A November 2009 United Nations mission headed by UN special rapporteur Gulnara Shahinian evaluated slavery practices in Mauritania. In an August 2010 report to the United Nations Human Rights Council (UNHRC), the mission concluded that "despite laws, programmes and difference of opinion with regard to the existence of slavery in Mauritania, ... de-facto slavery continues to exist in Mauritania."

While other countries in the region have people in "slavelike conditions", the situation in Mauritania is "unusually severe" according to African history professor Bruce Hall, and consists largely of black Mauritanians held by Arab masters.

The Mauritanian government's official position is that slavery is "totally finished ... all people are free." According to abolitionist Abdel Nasser Ould Ethmane, many Mauritanians believe that talk of slavery "suggests manipulation by the West, an act of enmity toward Islam, or influence from the worldwide Jewish conspiracy." Some human-rights groups claim that the government may have jailed more anti-slavery activists than it had imprisoned slave owners. Only one person, Oumoulmoumnine Mint Bakar Vall, has been prosecuted for owning slaves. She was sentenced to six months in jail in January 2011.

Academics Ahmed Meiloud and Mohamed El Mokhtar Sidi Haiba have criticized accusations of slavery in Mauritania alleged by anti-slavery organizations and writers as exaggerated with a lack of statistical sources and factual errors.

== Background and practice ==
Slave status has been passed down through the generations. The descendants of black Africans captured during historical slave raids now live in Mauritania as "Black Moors" or Haratin; some of them still serve as slaves to the lighter-skinned "White Moors" or Beidane ("Whites") (which are Berbers or mixed Berber-Arabs, descendants of slave owners known collectively as al-beidan). Although slavery also exists among the Sub-Saharan part of the population, with some Black Sub-Saharan Mauritanians owning slaves of the same skin color to them, and some estimates even stating that slavery is currently more widespread in that part of the population, in the south of the country. According to the Global Slavery Index, slavery of adults and children in Mauritania "primarily takes the form of chattel slavery," meaning that slaves and their descendants "are the full property of their masters." Slaves "may be bought and sold, rented out and given away as gifts". Slavery in Mauritania is "prevalent in both rural and urban areas", but women are reportedly "disproportionately affected" by slavery. Female slaves "usually work within the domestic sphere," caring for children and performing domestic chores, but "may also herd animals and farm." Female slaves "are subject to sexual assault by their masters." Because slave status is matrilineal, slaves typically serve the same families that their mothers and grandmothers had served. They usually sleep and eat in the same quarters as the animals of their owning families. Slaves are "not restrained by chains" but by "economic" and "psychological" factors. They are denied education in secular fields that provide job skills, and are taught that "questioning slavery is tantamount to questioning Islam." There is also a "grey area" or "a continuum" between slavery and freedom in Mauritania—also called the "vestiges of slavery"—in which sharecroppers and workers are exploited by Beidan landowners and bosses. According to Ahmed Vall Ould Dine of Mauritanian Human Rights Watch, "Slaves tend to develop very close relations with their masters; the freed ones, who are poor and have inherited nothing from their parents, chose to remain under the auspices of their ex-masters as they provide them with basic necessities of life."

Still today, masters lend their slaves' labor to other individuals, female slaves are sexually exploited and children are made to work and rarely receive an education.

Slavery particularly affects women and children, who are the most vulnerable among the vulnerable. Women of child-bearing age have a harder time emancipating because they are producers of slave labor and perceived as extremely valuable.

— From U.S. Dept. of State report on Slavery in Mauritania, 2009

According to the U.S. State Department's 2010 Human Rights Report, abuses in Mauritania include:

... mistreatment of detainees and prisoners; security force impunity; lengthy pretrial detention; harsh prison conditions; arbitrary arrests; limits on freedom of the press and assembly; corruption; discrimination against women; female genital mutilation (FGM); child marriage; political marginalization of southern-based ethnic groups; racial and ethnic discrimination; slavery and slavery-related practices; and child labor.

The 2010 report continued: "Government efforts were not sufficient to enforce the antislavery law. No cases have been successfully prosecuted under the antislavery law despite the fact that 'de facto' slavery exists in Mauritania."

=== Child slavery ===
Child labor also remains prevalent throughout Mauritania. The Mauritanian government conducted a raid in Nouakchott in November 2017 and rescued 42 child slaves who were held by Koranic instructors. According to the United States Department of Labor, violation of child slavery laws is rarely punished. The Special Brigade for Minors investigated 406 cases of child exploitation; however, it is unclear whether the Mauritanian legal system further investigated or punished anyone involved in those particular cases. Child slavery continues to be an issue in Mauritania because the status is passed down maternally from mother to child.

== French colonialism ==
The French colonized Mauritania in 1904 during the Scramble for Africa. Mauritania and other territories owned by France were known as sociétés esclavagistes or "slave societies" because slavery was a tradition with which the French interacted. The French reshaped slavery socially because "French administrators and French missionaries created a role for themselves ... that was, for the most part, compatible with local cultural customs." However, the economic impact was limited, as prices were not raised to a level high enough to promote a greater supply of slaves.

There were several interpretations of the impact that colonialism had on African societies. Mahmood Mamdani believed that colonialism allowed slave masters' power to remain unchecked because of the authority that backed them. However, other scholars believed that African institutions did not change because Europeans were simply consumers.

The French controlled their territories by the use of African employees from those territories. Mauritanian employees worked low-level positions and the "colonial hierarchy operated on the assumption that its African employees would act as transparent, unthinking conduits who would link white colonial authorities to black African colonial subjects." The African employees were not seen as a threat despite the fact that they had the ability to control the flow of information between the Mauritanians and the French because of the language barrier.

=== French abolitionist policies ===
The French implemented abolitionist policies after their territories failed to comply with a law freeing all slaves. Mauritanian administrators told the French that slavery was a custom in Mauritania and they could not simply abolish it without societal distress, so they enforced certain policies but still allowed slavery. Slaves in Mauritania were returned to their masters and treated as runaway children. Also, African men who were recruited into the French army, or tirailleurs, were allowed to take slave wives, but they had to have been free before they were married, and had to remain in the colony. Tirailleurs could claim their children by proving they were born legitimately; if not, they were slaves.

The French established villages de liberté ("liberty villages") so that slaves would have an area to be free in Mauritania. They could take refuge there and be taxed by the French. However, within three months the slave could be reclaimed by their masters, and the villages had few resources.

In the 1930s, France officially reported to the Advisory Committee of Experts on Slavery that slavery had been abolished in all French territories in Africa, including Mauritania.

Although the French liberated their other territories successfully, because Islam was so intertwined with slavery the French believed it would go against tradition to enforce abolition in Mauritania. The French also believed that "slaves themselves were simply 'not ready' to be wrenched from their social security, to do so would be to 'sow social disorder'." Consequently, domestic slavery and colonial slavery were still permitted in Mauritania.

== Role of religion ==
Islam is by far the most widely practiced religion in Mauritania, with the Maliki school of Sunni Islam as the dominant form. Maliki Islam in precolonial West Africa campaigned assiduously against the transatlantic slave trade, but in the 19th and 20th centuries many Malikis justified continued slavery inside Mauritania in some or all of its forms. Today, a dominant majority of Mauritanians believe that former slaves (irrespective of the status of their manumission) cannot be full and equal citizens or become imams.

Attempts to end slavery in colonial Mauritania largely failed because abolitionism was molded by Orientalism, or the ideology that Africans were "exotic, intellectually retarded, emotionally sensual, governmentally despotic, culturally passive, and politically penetrable."

Certain aspects of religion might have had an impact in the preservation of slavery-based structures. Concubinage, for example, was admitted in Islam and quite common. Concubines were expected to be treated humanely. Impressions of freedom were molded by notions of social order and the belief that God would forgive the sins of slaves if they behaved obediently for their masters.

After 1980, Mauritania's ulama (clerical scholarly community) concluded that no slaves had been acquired through jihad, so there was no sharia-based legitimacy to continue enslavement.

== Government position ==
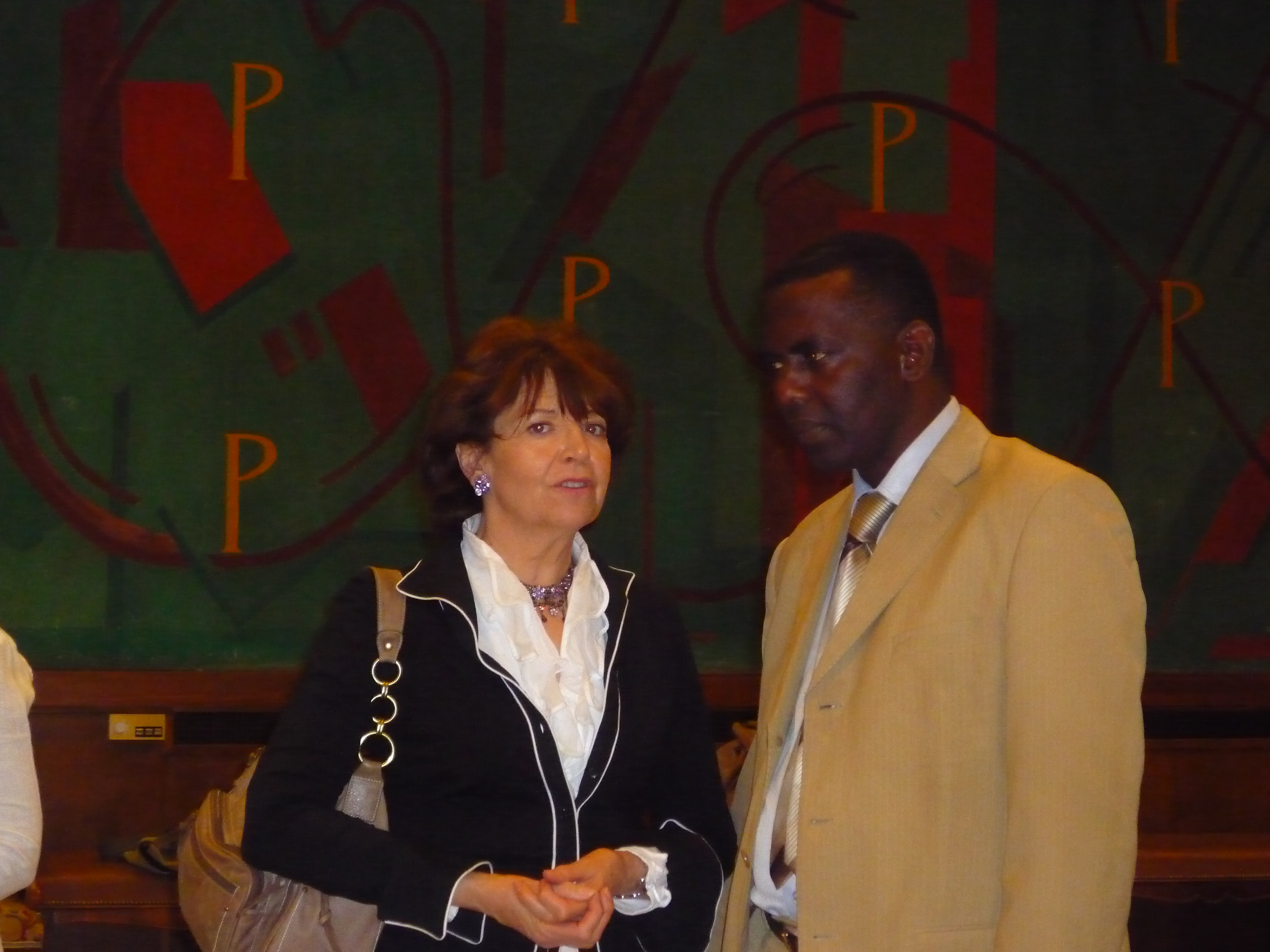
Marie-José Domestici-Met (CNCDH) and Biram Dah Abeid, who in 2009 was sentenced to six months in prison for taking part in unauthorised rally

The government of Mauritania (which is dominated by Beidanes) denies that slavery exists in the country. According to Abdel Nasser Ould Ethmane, a political adviser to the African Union and a cofounder of the abolitionist group SOS Slaves, the Mauritanian government officially says: "Slavery no longer exists, and talk of it suggests manipulation by the West, an act of enmity toward Islam, or influence from the worldwide Jewish conspiracy."

Responding to accusations of human rights abuse, in 2012 the Mauritanian Minister of rural development, Brahim Ould M'Bareck Ould Med El Moctar, stated:

I must tell you that in Mauritania, freedom is total: freedom of thought, equality—of all men and women of Mauritania ... in all cases, especially with this government, this is in the past. There are probably former relationships—slavery relationships and familial relationships from old days and of the older generations, maybe, or descendants who wish to continue to be in relationships with descendants of their old masters, for familial reasons, or out of affinity, and maybe also for economic interests. But (slavery) is something that is totally finished. All people are free in Mauritania and this phenomenon no longer exists. And I believe that I can tell you that no one profits from this commerce.

In March 2013, the President established an agency to "combat slavery", known as the "National Agency to Fight against the Vestiges of Slavery, Integration, and Fight against Poverty". The director, Hamdi Ould Mahjoub, a Beidane, told The New Yorker author Alexis Okeowo, "Slavery as an institution, as something accepted by society, does not exist" in Mauritania, and that his agency was working on a program to help farmers and others to build clinics and improve access to water.

According to the Mauritanian government, it has taken action to end all forms of slavery. In 2015, the government expanded the definition of slavery to include child labor, although they have difficulty enforcing anti-slavery laws. The government is underfunded and ill-equipped to deal with slavery.

== List of causes of persistence ==
- Many of the slaves are isolated by illiteracy, poverty, and geography, and do not know that life outside servitude is possible.
- The difficulty of enforcing any laws in the country's vast desert.
- Poverty that limits opportunities for slaves to support themselves if freed.
- Dependence on masters who provide food and clothing to slaves.
- Difficulty of "running away" and leaving families in large parts of the country that are desert.
- Belief that slavery is part of the natural order of this society.
- Belief in an interpretation of Islam in which slaves are "told that their paradise is bound to their master and that if they do what the master tells them, they will go to heaven".
- Mauritanian laws, which place the burden of proof on the slave, require that a victim file a complaint before an investigation is launched, and that human rights organisations may not file a case on behalf of a victim, despite the fact that most slaves are illiterate.

In November 2016, an appeals court in Mauritania overturned the jail convictions of three anti-slavery activists and reduced the sentences of seven others to time served leaving three in custody, for their alleged role in a riot in June, as reported by Amnesty International. Another court had originally sentenced the 13 human rights activists and members of the Resurgence of the Abolitionist Movement (IRA) to 15 years in prison.

== List of antislavery organizations ==
- Initiative for the Resurgence of the Abolitionist Movement (IRA-Mauritania), is led by Biram Dah Abeid, a descendant of slaves.
- Al'Hor الحر (translated as "the free")
- In'itaq إنعتاق (translated as "emancipation")
- SOS Esclaves (meaning "SOS Slaves" in French) aids slaves to escape from their masters, and petitions the government and the clergy to address the problem of slavery, but stops short of aggressively confronting authorities like IRA-Mauritania. SOS was co-founded by Boubacar Ould Messaoud and Abdel Nasser Ould Ethmane, a former slave who went on to study engineering and architecture in Mali and Moscow. As of 2014, he was in his late sixties and so, according to Messaoud, may represent an older generation. In 2011, Messaoud and Biram Dah Abeid held a hunger strike in a Nouakchott police station until the police put a slave owner in jail.

== International pressure ==
As a result of Mauritania's failing to curb slavery, in January 2018, the African Union officially reprimanded the Mauritanian government. The ruling was based on a case involving two brothers, Said Salem and Yarg Ould Salem, who were slaves since birth. The African Union ordered Mauritania to compensate the two brothers, causing activists to claim that the ruling would lay the groundwork enforcing anti-slavery laws within the country. In 2015, the Mauritanian government expanded the definition of slavery to include child labor. Extreme poverty and Islamic norms discourage many slaves from attempting to escape. Racial and ethnic division plays a role in Mauritanian government and society, as most slaves in Mauritania are black Mauritanians while members of the ruling class tend to be Arab.

The international community is increasingly pressuring Mauritania to enforce its anti-slavery laws. Along with the African Union's recent ruling, the United States in 2018 was reportedly considering downgrading its trade relations with Mauritania because of its poor record on enforcing its anti-slavery laws.

== See also ==
- Human rights in Mauritania
- Human trafficking in Mauritania
- Islamic views on slavery
- Slavery in Africa
  - Slavery in contemporary Africa
- Slavery in Oman
- Slavery in Saudi Arabia
