= Al-Itihaad al-Islamiya =

1983–1997 Somali Islamist militant group

- الاتحاد الإسلامي
- Founder: Ali Warsame
- Leaders: Ali Warsame (1983–1992); Sheikh Abdullahi Bade; Abdulsalam Osman; Hassan Dahir Aweys; Hassan Turki
- Dates active: 1983 to 1997
- Merger of: Wahdat al-Shabaab (Union of Islamic Youth); Jama'at al-Islamiya (Islamic Group)
- Split to: Jama'at al-I'tisam
- Headquarters: Luuq
- Active regions: Gedo Region, Somalia and Somali Region, Ethiopia

Al-Itihaad al-Islamiya (AIAI; Arabic: الاتحاد الإسلامي, lit. 'The Islamic Union') was an Islamist politico-military group in Somalia. Formed in 1983 through a merger of smaller Islamist groups, the organization was the most powerful Islamic movement in the country during the late 80s and early 90s. It also had the most widespread clan following of all the Islamist factions across the nation and professed the aim of creating a Somali Islamic state.

In response to the collapse of the Somali Democratic Republic during 1991, the organization militarized and became involved in several wars with foreign troops and clan based factions. It carried out insurgent attacks against United Nations Operation in Somalia II forces in Mogadishu and the Ethiopian army in the Ogaden during the early 1990s, while also fighting against the United Somali Congress and Somali Salvation Democratic Front. AIAI administered several major urban centers during the civil war including the ports of Merca and Bosaso and the inland city of Luuq.

After internal disputes over policy and several military defeats in the late 1990s, AIAI renounced the use of violence and effectively disintegrated in 1997 into other political entities.

== History ==
=== Origins ===
As the regime of Somali President Mohamed Siad Barre declined during the 1980s, Islamism began gaining strength throughout Somali society through various Islamic organizations. While many of the new Islamist groups had similar broad objectives, they often differed in approaches and methods. All the movements had initially agreed that propagating 'the Islamic Awakening' in Mosques and education centers was the best way to start transforming society. As the security situation across the country deteriorated the government of the Somali Democratic Republic saw these rapidly growing movements as a serious threat and issued bans, forcing them to continue work underground.

Al-Itihaad al-Islamiya (AIAI) had formed out of a merger of two Islamist groups during 1983, the mainly northern-dominated Wahdat al-Shabaab (Union of Islamic Youth) and the southern-dominated Al-Jamaa Al-Islamiya (The Islamic Group). Sheikh Ali Warsame, leader of the Union of Islamic Youth in Somaliland and a well-known preacher who played a crucial role in the merger, was appointed leader of Al-Ittihaad. He was at the time considered a consensus figure accepted by both the northern and southern Somali communities. Most members of the organization were students, teachers and professionals. Al-Ittihaad Al-Islami played a significant role in spreading the Islamic da'wah, educating the youth, and establishing Quranic schools and religious books until the collapse of the socialist government in 1991. Sheikh Abdulkadir Nur Farah stated:

After the formation of the Islamic Union Movement in 1983, Islamic activities multiplied, and the movement made its way into formal schools and universities, attracting many young people, and numerous Quranic schools were established by the youth of the Islamic awakening. This worried the regime greatly, and the government started banning Islamic publications and increasing inspections.

During the 1980's, Al-Itihaad also placed a major focus on providing welfare to refugee camps housing Somalis displaced from the Ogaden region following the 1977–1978 war with Ethiopia. While the organization had initially begun as a relief organization among Ogaden Somali populations, its ultimate goal was to free the Ogaden region from what Al-Itihaad and other Somali factions like the Western Somali Liberation Front and Ogaden National Liberation Front perceived to be Ethiopian colonial rule. AIAI opened Islamic schools across refugee camps and began covertly mobilizing youth. Consequently, the organization had a significant following in the region. Al-Itihaad extended its influence across various regions of Somalia and the Ogaden, exhibiting a wide spectrum of ideological inclinations ranging from moderate to more radical perspectives in different regions.

As the decade went on, tensions between Islamist movements and the government began building in Somalia. Crackdowns and executions by government forces led many Islamic students and religious scholars to flee abroad, primarily to Arab states. As the weakness of the Barre regime became apparent, Al-Itihaad went public for the first time during 1989. Despite tensions with the government, Islamist organizations in the country relied on nonviolent methods and none took up arms until the total collapse of the Somali Democratic Republic at the start of 1991.

=== Collapse of Somali state and militarization (1991–1992) ===
Members of the AIAI had not anticipated the collapse of the government and instead had expected for a democracy to take Barre's place. As all out civil war began in 1991, a faction within Al-Itihaad began pushing to take up arms against the factions that had overthrown the government. This led to significant debates within AIAI and other Islamist factions over what course of action to take. Many members of AIAI believed that a protracted strategy of focusing on social programs should be emphasized instead of attempting to achieve their goals via armed struggle. Numerous senior officers of the Somali National Army joined the AIAI post-1991, and consequently the organization had many informants in other Somali factions.

In June 1991, the first general conference was held in the Ogaden region, publicly establishing the organization and leadership in the territory. While AIAI had never renounced the use of violence, it first took a policy of cooperating with the directives of the newly formed post-Ethiopian Civil War government. In October 1991, Al-Itihaad formally registered as an Ethiopian political party. The organization also revealed the existence of its military wing to the government and delivered documents describing its political program.

==== Ogaden insurgency ====
On 11 August 1992, Ethiopian government forces ambushed AIAI, killing the organization's top leaders and two dozen other high ranking figures. Recent success in curbing the rise of organizations like the Oromo Liberation Front encouraged the Ethiopian government to try to eradicate Al-Itihaad before it had grown firm roots in the region. Following the killing AIAI quickly regrouped and elected Sheikh Abdulsalam Osman to replace Sheikh Abdulahi Bade, who had been assassinated in the ambush. This marked the beginning of a conflict lasting several months in 1992 that would see a total of nine battle between AIAI and the Ethiopian military, ending in a ceasefire by the end of the year.

The ceasefire would hold in the region until 1994.

=== AIAI–USC/SSDF conflict (1992) ===
In 1992, AIAI entered the Somali Civil War when it fought against the forces of the United Somali Congress led by General Mohamed Farah Aidid during the Battle of Arare Bridge. AIAI forces were defeated and withdrew south to Ras Kamboni and north to Bosaso. That same year the organization would take control of the port city of Bosaso. For the short period that AIAI controlled the city, it reportedly left a generally positive impression on the general population due to being less corrupt in its administration than the SSDF. The group also governed the port city of Merca in southern Somalia.

By 1992 the organization had become the most visible Islamist faction in Somalia. AIAI focused its recruiting effort on urban and semi-educated youth, as opposed to other Islamist factions that focused on nomadic populations. The leader of the organization, Sheikh Ali Warsame, left in 1992 and returned to Burao. He later became a leading figure of Jama'at al-I'tisam (Ictisaam) in 1996, which adopted a reformist, non-militant approach, focusing on preaching without resorting to warfare.

=== UNOSOM war (1993) ===
In a January 1993 interview with the New York Times in Merca, Al-Itihaad leaders stated that they viewed UNITAF (Operation Restore Hope) as an occupation force. Over a year earlier, Al-Itihaad had come in control of the port city and began governing, but relinquished control in the face of advancing US troops in December 1992. They charged that the American troops had arrived when the famine that had been gripping Somalia was ending. While the group had refrained from engaging with foreign troops at that point, the NYT noted, "But by all accounts, the fundamentalists are heavily armed and well disciplined, and should they choose to act could form the nucleus of a formidable resistance movement". There were estimated to be several thousand Islamic fighters in the country, cutting across clan lines. The organization refrained from participating in the Addis Ababa peace conference that began in January 1993 between warring Somali factions.

In September 1993, the Pan-Arab newspaper Al-Hayat reported that several Somali Islamic factions, including Al-Itihaad, who had previously remained neutral in the war, had tacitly allied with the Somali National Alliance against UNOSOM II and US forces. When the conflict had begun in June 1993, AIAI and other Islamic factions had divided over whether or not to begin fighting foreign troops because Aidid had previously been a major threat to them. As civilian casualties began mounting in July and August these groups, including AIAI, began to launch attacks on UNOSOM forces in Mogadishu after sunset. Independent sources in Mogadishu, corroborated by Al-Hayat, indicated that the majority of night military operations throughout 1993 were coordinated by a variety of Somali Islamic groups within the city, most prominently Al-Itihaad. While Aidid did not overtly claim responsibility for these night operations, Al-Hayat noted that he was 'delighted' by AIAI's support and that he further sought to project the appearance of being the orchestrator for propaganda purposes. Al-Itihaad fighters participated in the 1993 Battle of Mogadishu.

=== Luuq administration and AIAI–SNF/Ethiopia conflict (1994–1997) ===
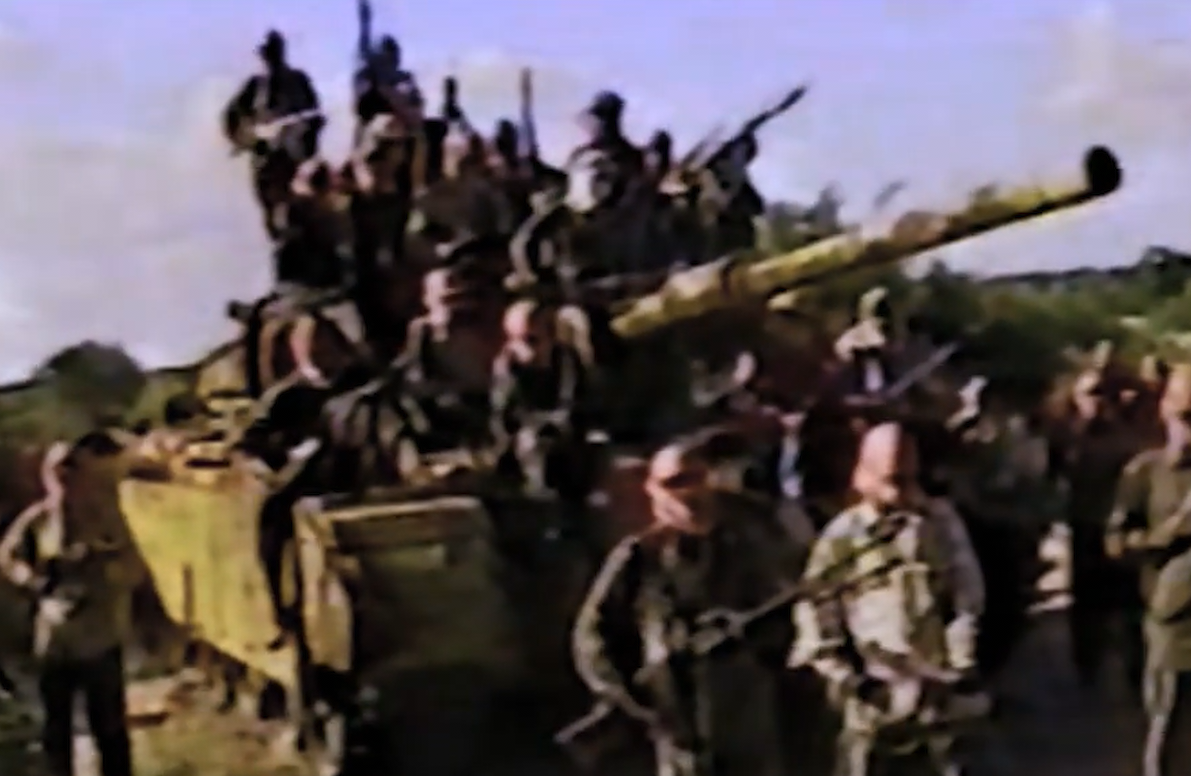
Al Itihaad Al Islamiya fighters standing on top of a disabled ENDF tank in Luuq, Somalia on the 23 of May 1996

By 1994, Al-Itihaad effectively gained control of the Gedo region of Somalia and headquartered itself in the city of Luuq. The organization replaced the dysfunctional customary law with Sharia, resulting in a secure environment and stable administration. In addition to providing stability AIAI also introduced free public education in the area they governed. Kenyan authorities also noted the increase in local security during AIAI’s rule. AIAI earned the respect of Luuq's population through their perceived honesty to the public and openness towards international aid. The administration's anti-clanism policies provoked the Somali National Front (SNF), a secular faction representing segments of the region's dominant Marehan clan, who accused AIAI of being "foreign forces taking control" The rising strength of AIAI led to military confrontations with the SNF, which was backed by the Ethiopian military. Ethiopia deployed troops and air power to assist the SNF against AIAI. This resulted in many Islamists who were not associated with Al-Itihaad to join the fight alongside them. Several Somali scholars produced fatwas calling on Somalis to fight the Ethiopian troops.

Funded by wealthy Saudis, Al-Itihaad also had extensive connections with the Somali expatriate community in Kenya, in particular the Eastleigh district of Nairobi and the predominantly Muslim coastal regions. At its height, the AIAI militia numbered over 1,000 fighters.

Over time, the rank and file of the organization became mired in heated debates over the issue of taking up arms against other Somali factions. Some members of AIAI renounced the use of violence against Somalis altogether and left the organization, while others who remained expressed unease over confrontations with other Somali factions. This debate forced Al-Itihaad to reconsider its strategy.

=== Renewed Ogaden insurgency ===
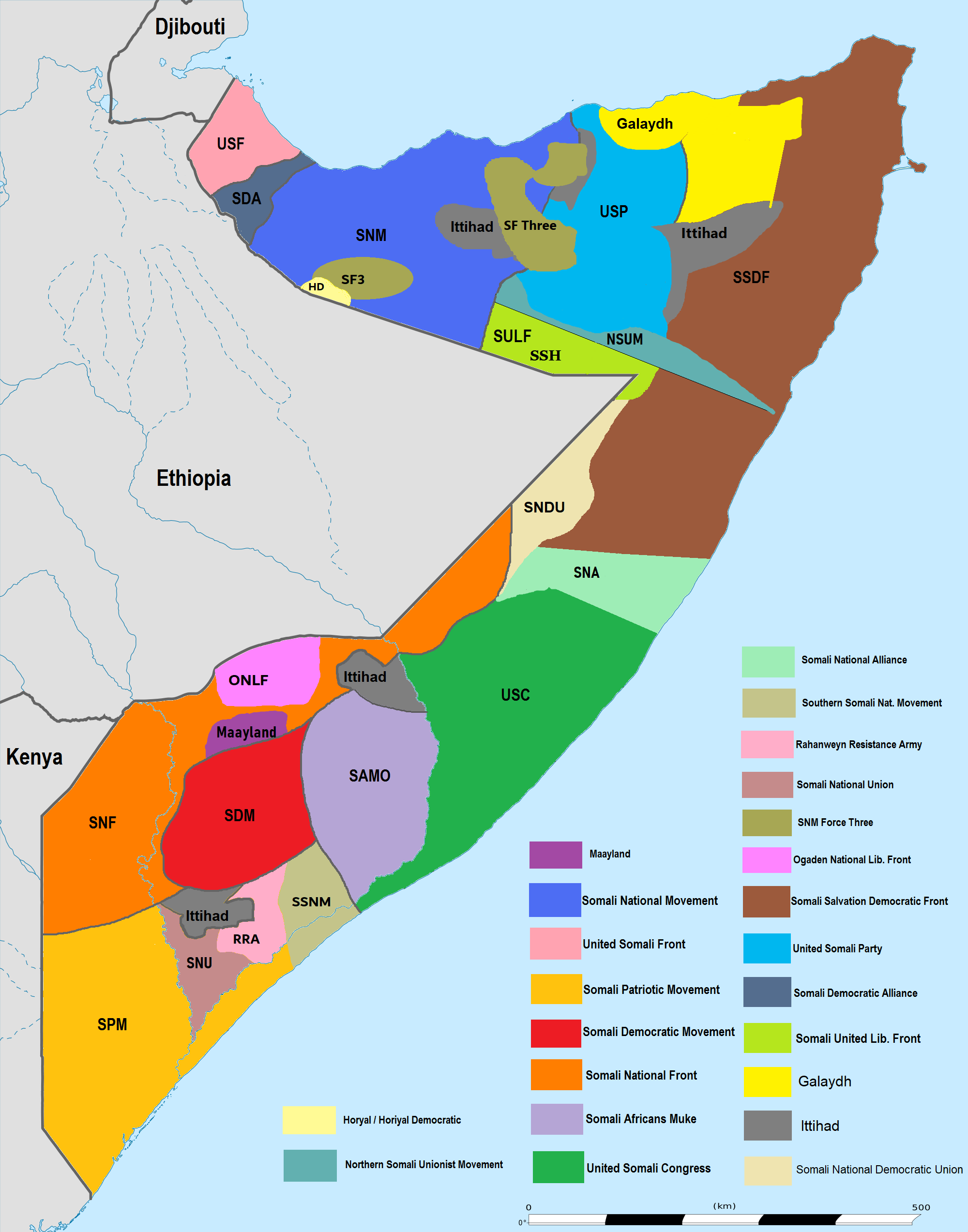
Various factions in Somalia in early 90s

In 1994, the ceasefire that had held in place between Al-Itihaad and the Ethiopian government collapsed after the latter broke the agreement by launching military operations. Guerrilla warfare carried out by Islamic fighters led the Ethiopian campaign to falter. It began fighting alongside the Ogaden National Liberation Front (ONLF) when Addis Ababa banned the party that same year. al-Itihaad were reportedly most active in the area between Kebri Dahar, Danan, Kelafo and Degehabur in 1994. By 1995, the group had grown in strength and was active in all parts of the Ogaden.

Al-Itihaad sent a delegation to the Peace and Unity Conference of the Somali Nation, which was held in February 1995 at Kebri Dehar, at which they made pledges which would eventually cause the organization to effectively cease to exist as a political and military force within the Ogaden. Fighting continued after the 1995 conference. An assassination was attempted on then Minister of Transportation and Communications, Abdul Majid Hussein in 1996. Another was in March of that year, when they raided areas in the Jigjiga Zone controlled by the Abskuul clan, apparently in collaboration with disaffected members of this clan. Established local security forces cleared al-Itihaad infiltrators from the Jigjiga Zone, and the defeated remnants retreated to disputed border areas between the Somali and Oromia regions, which has served as a refuge for them, as well as for Oromo fundamentalist rebel groups.

=== Decline and war on terror ===
In 1997 Al-Itihaad collectively decided to abandon the idea of using force in order to change the status quo due to internal fissures and military setbacks. Despite this major policy shift the organization still endorsed fighting against Ethiopia due to its perceived colonization of the Ogaden region. That same year the organization effectively became non-existent and split into three distinct centres, Mogadishu, Bosaso and Hargeisa. Following the organization's renunciation of armed struggle in 1997, many former AIAI members joined civil society organizations dedicated to public health and education.

On 7–8 March 1999, Ethiopia claimed it had made a cross-border incursion into Balanbale searching for members of AIAI who had reportedly kidnapped a person and stolen medical supplies, and denied reports of looting. Allegations from that time also claim Ethiopia was the supplier of various Somali warlords, while Eritrea was arming other warlords.

== Members ==
The following individuals were considered to be members of AIAI:

- Sheikh Ali Warsame (founder and first emir/chairman) (1983–1992)
- Sheikh Mohamed Haji Yusuf Al-Itihaad leader in Gedo region's 1992–1998
- Hassan Dahir Aweys
- Hassan Abdullah Hersi al-Turki
- Gouled Hassan Dourad
- Aden Hashi Ayro
- Fahad Yasin – Later head of Somalia's National Intelligence and Security Agency (NISA)

== Allegations of terrorism and Al-Qaeda links ==
On 7 November 2001 the United States listed AIAI as a terrorist organization due to alleged connections with Al Qaeda. The United Kingdom and New Zealand would follow suit soon after. The Bush administration did not publicly offer evidence supporting its allegations, but some US officials asserted that links between AIAI and Al Qaeda date back to the U.S. presence in Somalia during UNOSOM in 1993. According to Ted Dagne, an Africa specialist for the US Congressional Research Service:

...some observers are skeptical that Al-Itihaad is an international terror organization or that there is a strong link between Al Qaeda and Al-Itihaad. They argue that there are no credible reports that Al-Itihaad ever targeted innocent individuals, U.S. interests in Somalia or Africa. Some observers assert Al-Itihaad does not have regional reach let alone global reach.

Kenneth Menkhaus noted that little evidence exists to support claims for ties between AIAI and Al Qaeda. In the early 1990s, as Somalia fell into disorder following the collapse of the Siad Barre regime, Osama bin Laden reportedly took advantage of the chaos to fund al-Itihaad, later sending foreign militants who trained and fought alongside al-Itihaad members, with the goal of creating an Islamist state in the Horn of Africa. AIAI was also active in setting up sharia courts. Despite its association with al-Qaeda, other analysts cautioned against overgeneralisation, noting that al-Itihaad had elements of a genuine social movement and that the characters of sub-factions throughout the country substantially differed from each other.

On 24 September 2001, AIAI's finances were sanctioned by the administration of U.S. President George W. Bush under Executive Order 13224. Its then-head Hassan Dahir Aweys was also sanctioned under Executive Order 13224 in November of that year. In June 2004, Hassan Abdullah Hersi al-Turki, who had become leader of the organisation, was also sanctioned for his connections to bin Laden.

US officials alleged that Al-Qaeda operatives utilized the AIAI base on Ras Kamboni island, south of Kismayo near the Kenyan border. They further claimed that al-Qaeda established a training camp on Kamboni, while al-Itihaad set up another at Las Qoray near Bosaso's northeast port. Investigations in 2001 into these assertions found the Kamboni camp to be abandoned. After the September 11 attacks, US intelligence sources suggested that these camps were dismantled, with the militants relocating to tribal areas in Yemen.

=== Al-Barakat ===
An article published in the San Francisco Chronicle on 16 December 2001 quoted unnamed intelligence officials who claimed AIAI was extensively connected to al-Barakat. The San Francisco Chronicle called al-Barakat a Somali-based business conglomerate and money transfer organisation. They quoted former U.S. Treasury Secretary Paul H. O'Neill who called al-Barakat as one of the "financiers of terrorism". The 9/11 Commission report subsequently cleared al-Barakat of involvement in financing the 9/11 hijackers, the 9/11 Commission determined that the 9/11 hijackers received their remote funds transfers through US financial institutions, not Islamic financial institutions.

== Bibliography ==
- Elmi, Afyare Abdi (2010). Understanding the Somalia Conflagration: Identity, Political Islam and Peacebuilding. Pluto Press. ISBN 9780745329741.
- de Waal, Alex, ed. (2004). Islamism and Its Enemies in the Horn of Africa. Indiana University Press. ISBN 0-253-21679-6. OCLC 968612166.
- Abdi, Mohamed Mohamud (2021). A History of the Ogaden (Western Somali) Struggle for Self-Determination: Part I (1300–2007) (2nd ed.). UK: Safis Publishing. ISBN 978-1-906342-39-5. OCLC 165059930.
