= Ali Warsame =

Somali Islamic cleric and preacher, founder of AIAI (1939–2022)

Sheikh Ali Warsame Hassan Cali Warsame Xasan علي ورسمه حسن
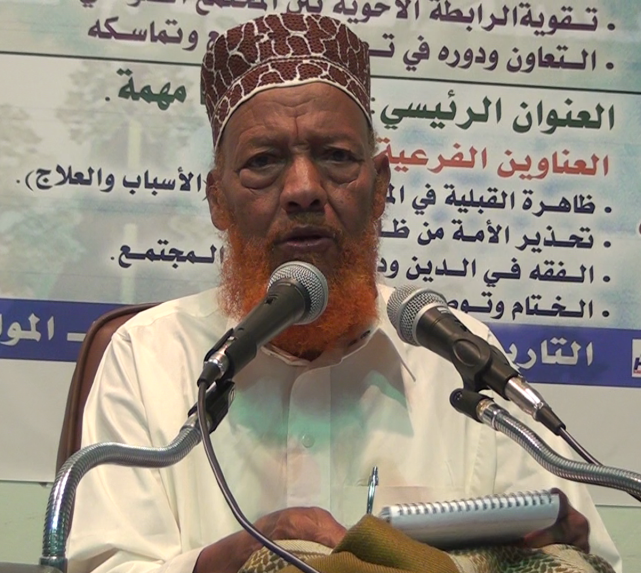

Personal life
- Born: 1939 Ainabo, Somaliland
- Died: 28 May 2022 (aged 82–83) Jordan
- Resting place: Hargeisa, Somaliland
- Children: Hassan Sheikh Ali Warsame
- Era: Modern Islamic period
- Region: Somaliland
- Political party: Al-Islah; Wahdat al-Shabaab; Al-Itihaad al-Islamiya (1983/84—1992); Jama'at al-I'tisam (1996—2022)
- Main interest(s): Salafism, Islamic activism
- Education: Islamic University of Madinah; King Saud University

Religious life
- Religion: Islam
- Denomination: Sunni
- Jurisprudence: Shafi'i
- Creed: Athari

Muslim leader
- Influenced: Hassan Sheikh Ali Warsame

Sheikh Ali Warsame Hassan (Somali: Sheekh Cali Warsame Xasan, Arabic: الشيخ علي ورسمه حسن) was a Somali Islamic cleric, preacher, and scholar of Dawah, credited with being one of the first scholars to introduce the Salafi Da'wah to Somalis. He was among the most prominent of Somali scholars.

A founder and emir of Al-Ittihad Al-Islamiya, he later broke ties with the group, becoming a leading figure of Jama'at al-I'tisam (Ictisaam) in 1996, a reformist, non-militant group.

== Biography ==
Sheikh Ali Warsame was born in 1939/1940 in the outskirts of Ainabo, in the Sarar region of Somaliland. Born to a pastoral family, he spent his childhood in the countryside and raised camels for his family. His father Warsame Hassan died when he was young. Sheikh Ali Warsame belongs to the Habar Je'lo clan of the wider Isaaq clan-family.

He moved to Burao to study in 1954, then Hargeisa, and later on went to study in Dire Dawa, Ethiopia in 1958, where he completed his memorization of the Quran and began studying Islamic sciences, including fiqh (jurisprudence) and Arabic grammar.

In 1961, after Somalia's independence he returned to Burao and joined the Egyptian Institute, which was later named the Gamal Abdel Nasser School in Burao.

He is the father of Dr. Hasan Ali Warsame, who graduated from the Faculty of Hadith at the Islamic University of Madinah with a doctorate degree.

== Preaching ==
In 1969, he enrolled at the Islamic University of Madinah in Saudi Arabia, where he pursued his Master's degree. During his studies in Saudi universities, Sheikh Ali Warsame developed a Salafi religious vision and began his preaching activities, and frequently engaged in debates with Sufis in various forums and mosques.

During the late 1970s, he joined the Al-Islah (Reform) movement, which was established at the time. However, he soon left the movement for reasons he mentioned:

After joining the Al-Islah movement, two members of the Islamic Group came to visit me in Riyadh. They were Abdul Aziz Farah (may God have mercy on him) and Abdullah Diriye Abtidon. The latter was a close friend of mine since we were university mates. They told me that two groups had formed at the same time, and we aim to unite them. One is the Islamic Group, and the other is the Al-Islah Movement. I suggested that they meet and unite. I arranged a meeting between them and the Al-Islah members. At the meeting, the two parties agreed on unifying their administrations as they found no other significant differences between them.

However, the Al-Islah movement rejected the idea of merging, leading Ali Warsame to withdraw from Al-Islah and join the Islamic Unity Youth group in Somaliland. He became its deputy president and later its president.

Sheikh Ali Warsame returned to Somalia in 1980 and began spreading da'wah in Burao. The sheikh was one of the first scholars to introduce the Salafi Da'wah to Somalia, advocating a return to the practices of early Muslims or the salaf, and became a pivotal figure in the Islamic revival movement. Due to this he was imprisoned several times by the then ruling regime led by Siad Barre. Sheikh Ali Warsame subsequently fled to Saudi Arabia in 1986 after the revolutionary government issued an arrest warrant.

== Involvement in AIAI and al-I'tisam ==
In 1983/1984, he played a crucial role in the merger of the mainly northern-dominated Wahdat al-Shabaab (Islamic Unity Youth) that he led and the southern-dominated Al-Jamaa Al-Islamiya (The Islamic Group), leading to the formation of the Al-Itihaad Al-Islami organization, where he was appointed as leader, with his brother-in-law Hassan Dahir Aweys as deputy. He was at the time considered a consensus figure accepted by both the northern and southern Somali communities:

I personally know Sheikh Ali Warsame on a personal level since we were classmates, and our fellowship was formed during our days of study at the Islamic University. Warsame appears to be a consensus figure accepted by both the northern and southern Somali communities, as he is trusted by all. I had the opportunity to meet him in Mecca, where we participated in preliminary integration discussions. Many individuals, including Abdulkader Mohamed Abdullah, Abdelkader Garre, and Dr. Ahmad Haji Abdirahman, were part of these discussions and others.

Al-Ittihaad Al-Islami played a significant role in spreading the Islamic da'wah, educating the youth, and establishing Quranic schools and religious books until the collapse of the socialist government in 1991. Sheikh Abdulkadir Nur Farah stated:

After the formation of the Islamic Union Movement in 1983, Islamic activities multiplied, and the movement made its way into formal schools and universities, attracting many young people, and numerous Quranic schools were established by the youth of the Islamic awakening. This worried the regime greatly, and the government started banning Islamic publications and increasing inspections.

He later on left the organization in 1992 and returned to Burao. He went on become a leading figure of Jama'at al-I'tisam (Ictisaam) in 1996, which adopted a reformist, non-militant approach, focusing on preaching without resorting to warfare.

== Teaching and Mentorship ==
Sheikh Cali Warsame was a respected educator, and upon his return to Burao he continued teaching Islamic jurisprudence and Hadith sciences. He served as a senior lecturer at Najaah University in Burao and was actively involved in teaching Islamic sciences at several universities and continued to deliver religious lectures until his death.

Throughout his career, he mentored numerous students who later became prominent Islamic scholars, including his son Dr Hassan Sheikh Ali Warsame.

=== Opposition to Extremism ===
When Al-Shabaab emerged in Somalia, Sheikh Cali Warsame was among the scholars who vehemently opposed their ideology. According to state media, he met with Ahmed Godane, the leader of Al-Shabaab, to debate extremist ideologies. In 2009, Sheikh Cali participated in a council of scholars that engaged with Al-Shabaab leaders, advocating for reconciliation and dialogue between Somalia's transitional government and Al-Shabaab.

== Death ==
Sheikh Ali Warsame died on 28 May 2022 in Jordan aged 83. His body was flown to Hargeisa, Somaliland, where he was buried.
