= Abdinasir Haji Ahmed =

Somali scholar (1957-2022)

Sheikh Cabdinaasir Xaaji Axmed عبد الناصر حاج أحمد
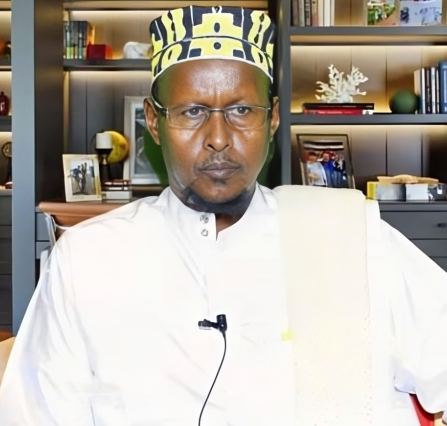
- Title: Shiikh

Personal life
- Born: 1957 (age 68–69) Salla-Galoolay, Ceegaag Horufadhi
- Died: February 22, 2022 Kismayo, Somalia
- Cause of death: Assassinated by Al-Shabaab
- Era: Modern Islamic period
- Political party: Somali Council of Uluma
- Main interest(s): Dawah and Fiqi

Religious life
- Religion: Islam
- Denomination: Sunni
- Jurisprudence: Shafi'i
- Creed: Salafi
- Movement: Jama'at al-I'tisam

Abdinasir Haji Ahmed Yusuf (Somali: Cabdinaasir Xaaji Axmed; born 1957–2022 Arabic: عبد الناصر حاج أحمد) was a Somali cleric and Islamic preacher for Dawah. Sheikh Abdinasir was assassinated by Al-Shabab in Kismayo, on 22 February 2022.

== Early life and education ==
Abdinasir Haji Ahmed Yusuf was born on 1957, at rural area of (Somali: Salla-Galoolay) near the village of Ceegaag now in Cayn region of Somalia. He relocated with his family from the rural area to the Horufadhi town. In 1964, he enrolled in the first Qur’anic school established there, where he memorized the Quran. Later, he moved to Burao to further his education. At the Salihiya Mosque School, he excelled in memorizing texts and mastering Islamic Sharia, completing his studies with proficiency in Quranic memorization.

In 1965, Abdinasir Haji Ahmed relocated to the coastal city of Berbera, where he enrolled in the Al-Falah Model School. There, he completed his studies in Sharia sciences and the Arabic language, alongside subjects like mathematics.

In 1967, Sheikh Abdinasir returned to Burao and enrolled in an institute affiliated with Al-Azhar Al-Sharif. There he pursued studies in jurisprudence, hadith, and other Islamic sciences. Additionally, he participated in scientific circles held in mosques and studied under several prominent scholars of the city, including Sheikh al-Qadhi Mohamoud and Sheikh Sharif Mohamed.

After completing secondary school, he journeyed to the Somali capital, Mogadishu, where he studied Sharia Law in Islamic seminars and under the guidance of notable scholars such as Sheikh Ibrahim Sule, Sheikh Mohamed Moalim Hassan, and Sheikh Mohamed Nur Qawi.

He served Military duty for Somali National Army before moving to Yemen to further his studies in Sharia Law. There, he studied under prominent Yemeni scholars, including Sheikh Al-Qadhi Yahya Al-Faisal, Sheikh Al-Qadhi Mohammed bin Ismail Al Amrani, Sheikh Dr. Muhammad Hassan Maqbool Al-Ahdal, and Sheikh Dr. Abdul Wahab Al-Dailami.

== Career ==
Abdinasir Haji Ahmed was appointed as the chairperson of the Somali community in Yemen by the Ministry of Endowments and Guidance after successfully passing a test administered by the Ministry for several Somali scholars. He served as a teacher in numerous scientific institutes in Yemen for a decade, from 1982 to 1992.

He returned to Somalia in 1992, a year after the outbreak of the Somali Civil War in 1991. He settled in the city of Las Anod, the administrative capital of the Sool region, where he began contributing to Islamic preaching and teaching Islamic books.

In 1994, Sheikh Abdinasir set to establish the Al-Furqan Institute of Islamic Studies, for teaching and preparing the next generation of scholars through agreements with Sheikh Ahmed Haji Abdirahman and Sheikh Abdulkadir Nur Farah. The institute successfully built and trained many students.

Sheikh Abdinasir's contributions and accomplishments nearly three decades, from 1992 until his assassination in 2022, to spreading Islamic teachings throughout Somalia with an Islamic library with numerous books on legal issues. It's noted that Sheikh Abdinasir has more than a thousand discographies, but there is still more that has not been recorded.

== Assassination ==
Sheikh Abdinasir Haji Ahmed was a vocal opponent of al-Shabab's attacks on civilians, such as targeting hotels, cafeterias, and markets, which he viewed as contrary to Islamic morals. He publicly condemned al-Shabab's actions multiple times, including at Islamic seminars held in Garowe, Bosaso and Las Anod.

Al-Shabab threatened Sheikh Abdinasir and his colleagues, ultimately assassinating Sheikh Dr. Ahmed Haji Abdirahman in 2011 and Sheikh Abdulkadir Nur Farah in 2013.

In early 2022, Sheikh Abdinasir continued to warn against al-Shabab's extremist ideology, On February 22, 2022, he was assassinated by a car bomb explosion during a visit to Kismayo, Jubaland. Al-Shabab claimed responsibility for his assassination.

=== Reactions ===
The Somali community expressed outrage and questioned how an iconic Sheikh could be targeted with an improvised bomb that detonated on Sheikh Abdinasir's car. They blamed President of Jubaland, Ahmed Mohamed Islam for neglecting Sheikh Abdinasir's security.

Somali scholars and government officials condemned the attack. President of the Federal Government Mohamed Farmaajo denounced the heinous act and vowed that those responsible would pay the price. Former President Sheikh Sharif and President of Puntland, Said Abdullahi Deni described the attack as egregious and blatant, targeting noncombatants. Other regional state presidents also joined in condemning the attack.
