= Abdel Nasser Ould Ethmane =

Mauritanian human rights activist

Abdel Nasser Ould Ethmane (Arabic: عبد الناصر ولد عثمان) is a Mauritanian human rights activist one of the founding members of SOS Esclaves (SOS Slaves). He along with Boubacar Messaoud founded the human rights organization to abolish slavery in Mauritania.

== Biography ==
At the age of 7, Abdel was presented with a choice of gifts and selected ownership of Yebawa Ould Keihel, a young dark-skinned boy, forging a bond that was disrupted by their forced master-slave dynamic and restrictions on their interaction.

During his studies in Nouakchott, Abdel pursued a nomadic lifestyle. His enlightenment began when a European tutor assigned him to the French Cultural Center, where he encountered the phrase "Men are born and remain free and equal in rights" from a text about the French Revolution. This statement deeply resonated with Abdel, prompting a shift in his values.

After seeking counsel from his father, Abdel learned that his father had attempted to emancipate their slaves in the past, but faced resistance from the slaves themselves. This revelation spurred Abdel to actively denounce slavery and undertake menial tasks formerly performed by his slaves as part of his personal development.

=== SOS Slaves ===
In 1995, Abdel founded SOS Slaves (SOS Esclaves) with Boubacar Messaoud, a former slave. Together they sought to end the practice of slavery in Mauritania, which had already been illegal since 1981.

Both men have been arrested and tortured in their attempt to convince both the slave owning class, and blacks, of the wrongness of slavery.

SOS Slaves published the stories of slaves who had been freed, in addition to lobbying on the behalf of slaves who had not yet been freed. In 2007, the Mauritanian government voted unanimously to make slave ownership a crime.

=== International advocacy ===
Abdel is a UN advisor to the office of West Africa. He is also a member of the Human Rights Foundation's International Council.
