= Ahmed Haji Abdirahman =

Somali cleric scholar (1957–2011)

Sheikh Ahmed Haji Abdirahman
- Axmed Xaaji Cabdiraxmaan أحمد حاج عبد الرحمن
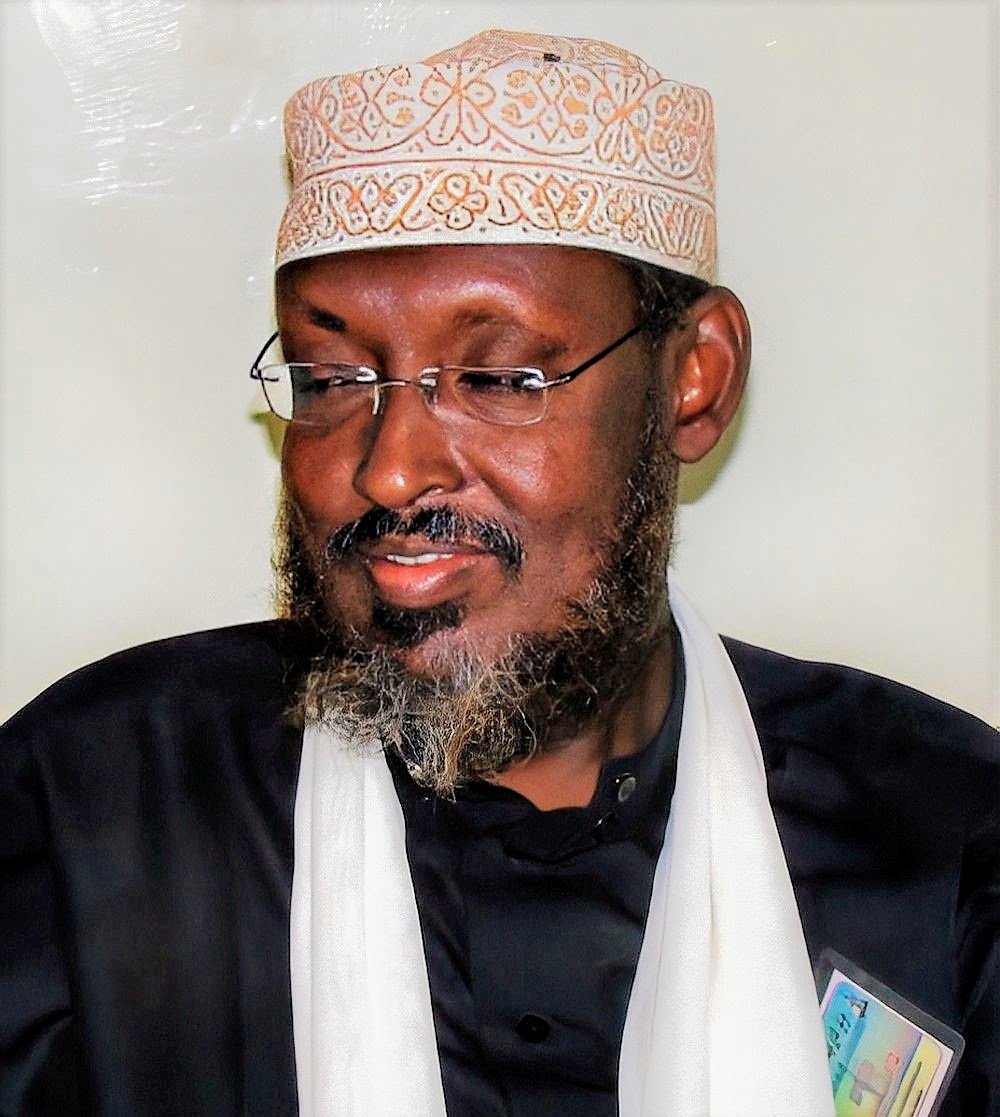

Vice chancellor of East Africa University
- In office 1999–2008

Personal details
- Born: 1957 Galkayo, Somalia
- Died: December 4, 2011 (aged 53–54) Masjid Hassan Ibn Ali, Bosaso
- Cause of death: Assassinated by Al-Shabab
- Resting place: Eastern cemetery of Bosaso
- Citizenship: Somalia
- Party: Jama'at al-I'tisam (1996-2011)
- Education: Umm al-Qura University
- Occupation: Ulama

Military service
- Somali Armed Forces: First lieutenant

Ahmed Haji Abdirahman Mohamed (Somali: Axmed Xaaji Cabdiraxmaan Maxamed, Arabic: احمد حاجي عبدالرحمن محمد; 1957–2011) was a Somali cleric, preacher and Muslim scholar. He was one of the leading scholars of Somalia and the vice president of East Africa University and one of its founders. He was a member of the Association of Somali Scholars, the most prominent theorists of the Salafist movement in Somalia. He was assassinated by Al-Shabab in Bosaso on December 4, 2011.

== Early life ==
He was born in 1958, in the rural area of Mudug region, he grew up and was raised in the Galkayo. He comes from a prominent religious family, as his father, Haji Abdirahman, was a scholar and a representative in the first House of Representatives, which was formed after the independence of Somalia. He was one of the founders of the Somali Youth League Party in the 1940s, and his mother is from a family famous for poetry. Her brother, Yasin Osman Kenadid, was the first to write a dictionary in the Somali language.

He says in his memoirs, compiled by advisor Muhammad Omar:

I was born in the city of Galkayo in 1958 to a family that enjoyed a social and political status. My father was a representative in the first Somali parliament and one of the founders of the Somali Youth League Party, and my mother came from a family famous for linguist and poetry, the “Kenadid family,” a family that enjoyed a strong reputation among Somali society. When I was born, my father was a member of the internal parliament before independence.

He memorized the Qur’an at a young age and sought knowledge at an early age. He memorized the texts, and studied in a model school in the city of Galkayo, supervised by Al-Azhar Al-Sharif. He moved to the Somali capital, Mogadishu, to complete his education, and studied preparatory school at the Mohammed Abdullah Hassan (School), then secondary school at Gamal Abdel Nasser School. He says:

At an early age, I began to follow the colors of Arab culture. The first book I read was The Days by Taha Hussein, and the author was of Abbas Mahmoud al-Aqqad, famous for Geniuses and I followed the articles of journalist Ahmed Bahaa El-Din one of the writers of 'Al-Ahram', as well as the writings of Mohamed Hassanein Heikal I used to read novels, detective stories, and the masterpieces of Shakespeare and Children of Gebelawi Naguib Mahfouz and this reading was not of my desire. But reality forced me because I loved reading, and to satisfy that desire, I would read any book I could get my hands on.

He joined compulsory conscription after graduating from high school, and obtained a scholarship in military sciences in Iraq. He graduated from the sixtieth batch of the Marine Corps in Mosul, and engaged in military work until he reached the rank of lieutenant. And he resigned after that. He says about himself in his memoirs:

When I graduated from high school, I was among fifteen people who were the first to achieve academic achievement in 1977. Accordingly, I obtained a scholarship from Iraq to study military sciences, specializing in marine infantry, batch 60. And after completing my military studies I was awarded a bachelor's degree in military sciences, and immediately returned my homeland and engaged in military work for a short period, reaching the rank of first lieutenant. After that, I submitted my resignation from military work to devote myself to studying Sharia law, which was my greatest concern, Alhamdulilah. Then Influenced by the beginnings of my scientific formation; I joined Umm Al-Qura University in Mecca in 1986, majoring in Hadith studies, and I was ranked first in my class. After graduation, I registered for postgraduate studies – a Master's – and the title of my thesis was "Information of the Benefits of Umdat Al-Ahkam by Ibn Al-Mulqim: Study and Investigation". I passed with an excellent grade, and immediately after that I applied for a doctorate, and the title of my thesis was "Al-Hafiz Maglatai bin Falij and his efforts in the sciences of hadith". I passed with an excellent grade – also – with a recommendation to print the thesis.

== Career of Dawah ==
Dr. Ahmed was active in Islamic advocacy in Somalia in his youth, and participated in Islamic movements since their beginning. He was a member of the Jama'atu Al-Ahl in the 1970s, and he used to study scientific books even during his service in the army. He was often involved in street advocacy. He says in his memoirs:

In the late sixties, around the year 1968, the Islamic Youth Union was founded. It was composed of young men, most of whom were high school students, eager to implement Sharia law. They had an office and carried out activities, including holding demonstrations and marches, singing songs in the Somali and Arabic languages, some of which were old and some of which they composed. Most of the youth were associated with “ Youth Union” joined the lessons of Sheikh Muhammad, Hassan's teacher، In the Al-Maqam Mosque in Mogadishu, Sheikh Muhammad was a teacher who came from Egypt after obtaining his first university degree and master's degree from Al-Azhar from the College of Fundamentals of Religion. I think he was in the philosophy department, and his master's thesis was related to the subject of faith.

The underground movements began at the beginning of the seventies (1970 - 1971). The beginning was the “Al-Ahl” movement. They aimed to bring together the youth, spread the message, and gain power. They used among their means to encourage education and urge young people to join the army to bring about future reform in politics. One of their goals was Restoring the Islamic caliphate, Islamic rule, and seizing power. Groups of young people began to join the armed forces in their sections since 1973, 1974, 1975, and 1977. Their total number reached thirty-two members who joined the forces, linked to each other and having no relationship with anyone else who belonged to the movement for Al-Sariya Governorate. They were among the most brilliant students and later became among the best officers.

The call was making its way into the female and male community alike, but the organization was restricted to men, secrecy was strict, obedience to orders was strong, and enthusiasm was at its peak.

The revolution was disturbed by this counter-revolution, which was escalating at a rapid pace, and was unable to comprehend the phenomenon. This assessment was preceded by the issuance of the Family Law, which exploded the situation and made it more tense. One of its results was the uprising of scholars at the beginning of 1975, and the killing of ten of them was a painful catastrophe that resulted in serious repercussions. This represented the beginning The people's clash with the regime and the erosion of its prestige. I remember Sheikh Musa, who was the greatest scholar executed by the regime. He said: Oh God, protect us from the evil of communism. He was a teacher who taught Sheikh Muhammad's lesson and he was from the people of Odel.

As a result of the Somali government's restrictions on Dawa activists, many of them were forced to leave the country. Dr. Ahmed Haji Abdurahman was among those who left for the Saudi Arabia and was a link between the pioneers of the Awakening at home and in the Gulf.

He participated in founding the Al-Itihaad al-Islamiya movement, and was one of its most prominent theorists:

In Saudi Arabia and Egypt, differences of opinion emerged within the Somali Awakening. Members’ differences emerged in the approach to change and in governing society. Following previous disagreements, the “Islamic Group” was founded, and it was soon exposed to internal divisions. Then ideas of unifying the Islamic groups began, and two factions came together, namely Unity in Southern Somalia, and the Islamic Group in the north, and in the summer vacation of 1983 AD, we met in Mogadishu. We as a group - that is, the Islamic Group - made the decision to merge with “Unity” and agreed to give up the presidency but adhere to the approach. Then a delegation was sent that visited the north and they met with the leadership of “Unity.” » There they brought their notables to Mogadishu, and it was agreed to establish the Islamic Union Movement and choose Sheikh Ali and appoint him Hassan as head of the nascent movement.

In the 1990s, the Islamic Union Movement fought many wars and was exposed to internal divisions until it evacuated itself in 1996:

The decision to stop the war and dissolve the camps was taken in Mecca and then confirmed in the Shura meeting in Djibouti. One of the objective reasons for taking the decision to demobilize the forces was that these - the youth of the Islamic Union - are out in the open, devoid of the means of strength and protection, and it is difficult to spend on them for a long time, and they are vulnerable. To be bombed from the air at any moment, and the goal of seizing the area was not achieved, and I remember that the men who were defending and protecting the camps accepted this with great bitterness, and in my opinion and those like me, the decision to disband and demobilize the forces was characterized by farsightedness and the prevailing interest felt by a rational person, and the people agreed on If they remained in isolation, the arena would become empty for the Takfiri ideology that began to penetrate their ranks.

Dr. Ahmed Haji Abdirahman participated in the founding of the Jama’atu Al-I’tisam group in 1996, which was born as a result of the alliance of the Al-Itihaad al-Islamiya and the Islamic Rally, after renouncing violence, laying down weapons, dissolving the camps, and engaging in civil society. This was followed by his return to Somalia 1998 and his activity. In the invitation.

== Educational attainment ==
- He obtained a BA in Islamic Sharia from Umm Al-Qura University in 1986.
- He obtained a master's degree in Islamic Sharia from Umm Al-Qura University in 1992.
- He obtained a doctorate in Prophetic Hadith from Umm Al-Qura University in 2000.

== Scholars ==
Many scholars spent their studies at Umm Al-Qura University in Mecca. He says about that period:

Among the Saudi scholars whom I studied were Dr. Ahmed Nour Saif, Ali al-Hindi, a teacher in the Haram, and Saeed Shafa. Al-Tirmidhi read to me, and his father was a teacher in the Haram. He belongs to Wullu - in Ethiopia - and they are more than the Somalis who studied these sciences in their country in the Arabic language, so they come and organize Islamic sciences in poetry. Among those I met were His Eminence Sheikh Abdulaziz bin Baz, Ibn Uthaymeen, Abdul Mohsen Al-Abad Vice President of Islamic University at the time, and Hammad Al-Ansari He is an outstanding heritage, and I am proud to know Abu Turab al-Zahiri, who is a Zahiri sect, and Abu Abd al-Rahman Ibn Aqeel al-Zahiri, who had two houses in Riyadh, one of which was named Abu Dawud and the other Ibn al-Hazm al-Andalusi, after the two Zahiri imams.

== Published works ==
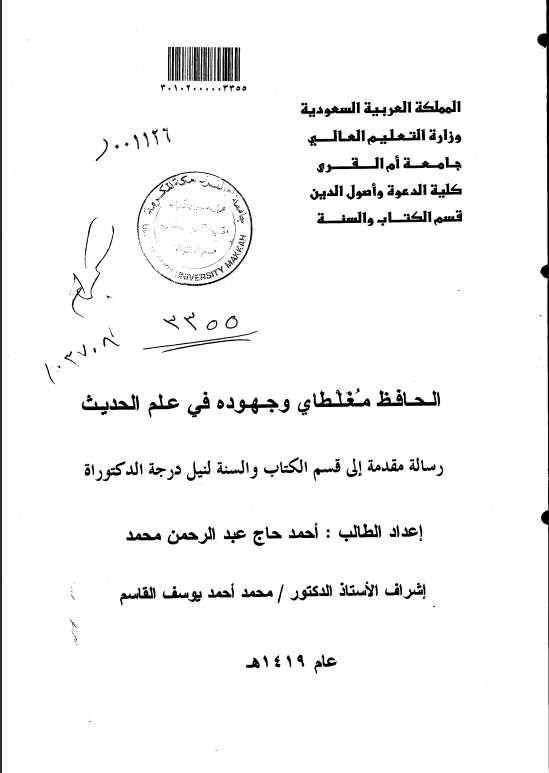

- Al-Hafiz Maghalatai and his efforts in the science of hadith - a doctoral dissertation at Umm Al-Qura University 2000 under the supervision of Dr. Muhammad Ahmad Al-Qasim.
- Information about the benefits of Umdat al-Ahkam by Ibn al-Mulqin, from the chapter on Witr to the Book of Funerals, study and investigation (Master's thesis), supervised by: Mansour bin Aoun al-Abdali.

He wrote an article called “A Look at the Arab Revolutions” at the height of the Arab Spring revolutions, which sparked controversy. Among the things he said in it were:

The most effective solution for the nation to emerge from its crisis is dialogue, reconciliation, and not excluding any party, because the path of exclusion in the past led to the current tension, and it will not lead to a permanent solution and a significant renaissance in the future. What is also required of the nation: to look forward in getting out of its crisis by defining priorities, setting strategies near and far, dealing with reality with skill and knowledge, distinguishing between what is hoped for and what is available, being aware of the obstacles and obstacles that exist, benefiting from all the energies of the nation, and giving priority to the principle of reconciliation over the principle of revenge and settling scores.

- The phenomenon of fanaticism and the position of the Sunnis towards it (message)

== East Africa University ==
He founded the University of East Africa with his colleague and friend, Dr. Abdul Qadir Muhammad Abdullah Samantar, after they returned together from Saudi Arabia in 1999 to the city of Bosaso in Somalia. He was chosen as Vice President and held the position until 2008.He was the one who came up with the idea of naming the university by this name.

== Assassination ==
On December 4, 2011, Ahmed Haji Abdirahman was assassinated by Al-shabab, 7 bullets was penetrated his body. As he left the Al-Hussein Bin Ali Mosque in the city of Bosaso, Somalia, In prayed Fajr, Nine of those who participated in the assassination were arrested.

In 2013, Puntland Government executed 13 presumed al-Shabaab members, including nine orchestered, after the military court found them guilty of masterminding the assassination of Dr Ahmed Haji Abdirahman. But the militant refused to acknowledge that none of them was part of the group.

== Photo Gallery ==
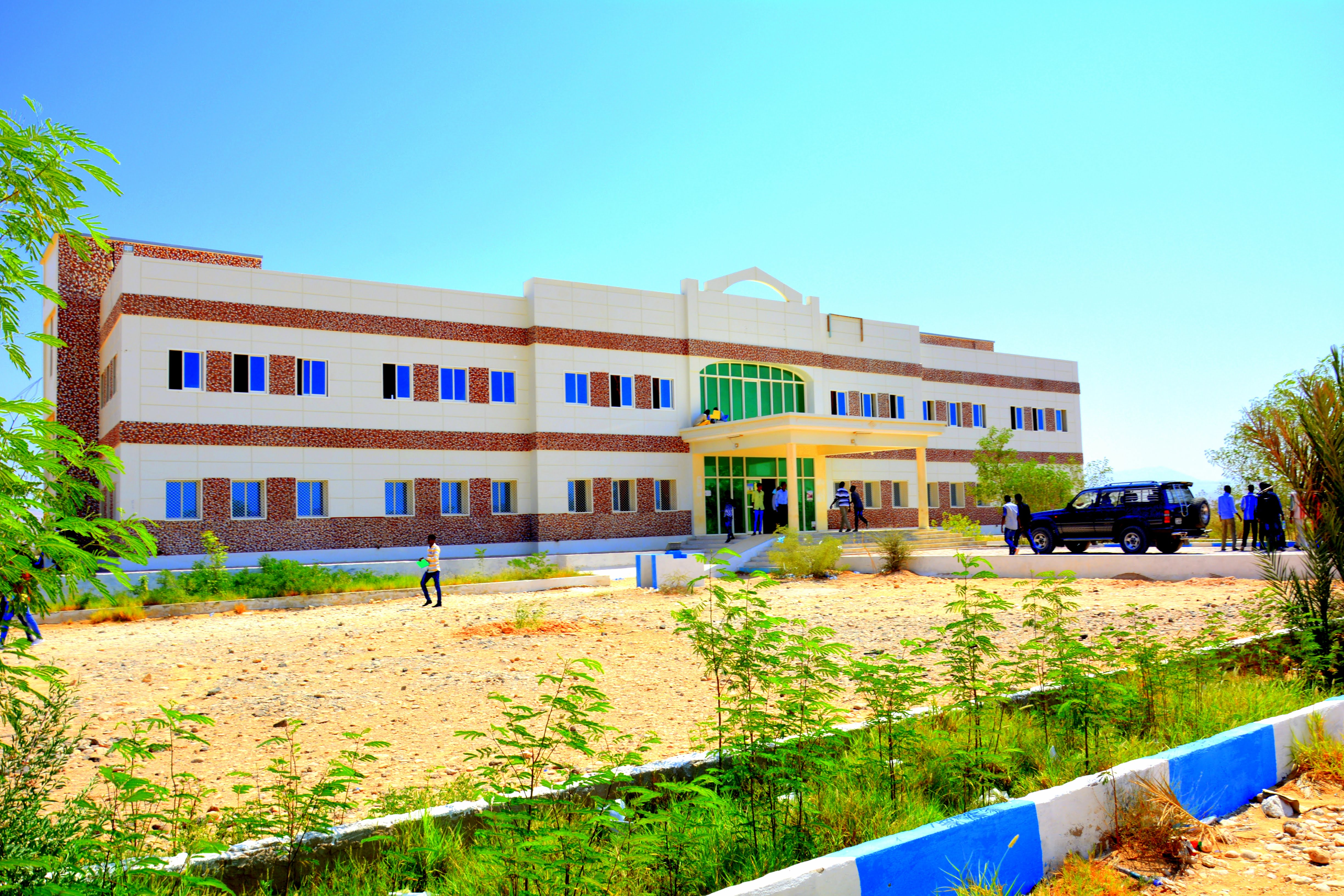
A building named after Dr. Ahmed Haj Abdel Rahman at the East Africa University

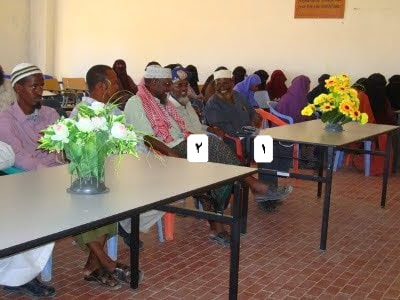
A photo of the President of the East African University, Dr. Abdelkader Mohamed Abdallah Samantar, and his deputy, Dr. Ahmed Haj Abdel Rahman.

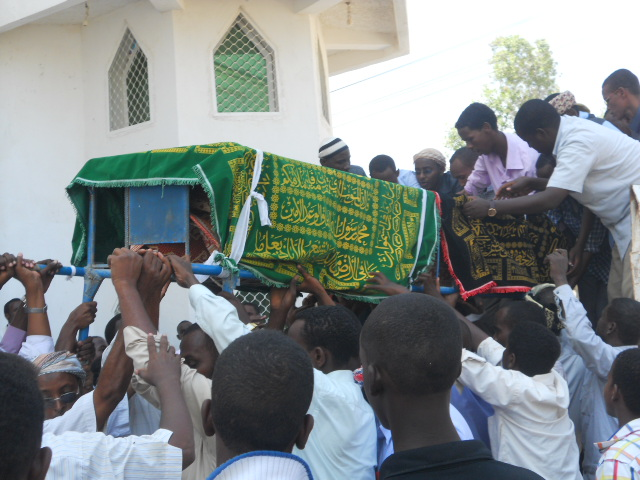
Dr. Ahmed's body after praying over him at Al Rawda Mosque in Bosaso

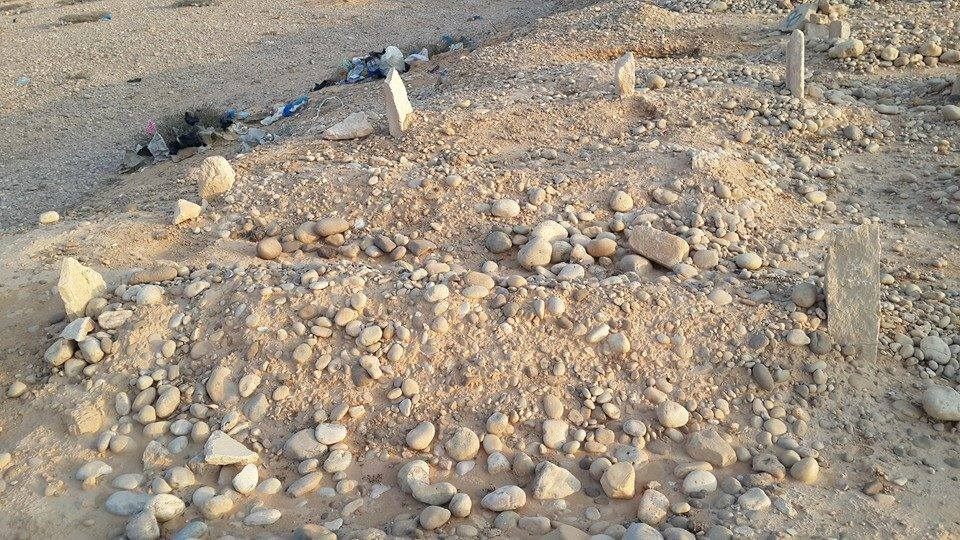
The grave of Dr. Ahmed Haj Abdel Rahman
