= Abdulnasser Mugali =

Yemeni poet and writer

Abdulnasser Mugali (Arabic: عبد الناصر مجلي) is a Yemeni poet and writer, living since 1992 in the United States. He has published several collections of poetry and three volumes of fiction starting with Dhat masāʾ.. dhat rāqisa (One Night.. a Dancer) in 1991. His novel Rijāl al-Thalj (Snow Men) dealt with the lives of Yemeni immigrants in America. He has recently turned to writing science fiction.

Mugali's work has been translated into Italian and was included in a 2009 anthology of Yemeni literature titled Perle dello Yemen. He is the chief editor of The Nation Arab American News Network website. Based in Detroit, he is also publisher of The Arab American Today, an online journal.
