= East Africa University =

Non-profit university in Eastern Africa

- Type: Non-profit institution
- Established: 1999; 27 years ago
- Founders: Abulkadir Mohamed Abdallah First Rector; Abdulkadir Nur Farah; Ahmed Haji Abdirahman
- Chairman: Sheikh Abdulwahid Hashi Hassan Bosaso
- Chancellor: Dr.Abdirazak Mohamud Takar
- Vice-Chancellor: Prof. Abdisalam Issa-Salwe (Academic Affairs)
- Location: Somalia; 11°14′32″N 49°12′7″E
- Campus: Suburban
- Colors: Blue, red and white

East Africa University (EAU) (Arabic: جامعة شرق أفريقيا) is a not-for-profit institution university in the autonomous Puntland state in northeastern Somalia, as well as in neighbouring Somaliland. Founded in the commercial capital of Bosaso, it has additional branches in Buhodle, Galdogob, Galkayo, Garowe, Qardho and Erigavo. The college offers courses in seven core departments including: Medicine, engineering, veterinary, Business Administration, Sharia studies, It also operates a distance learning center.

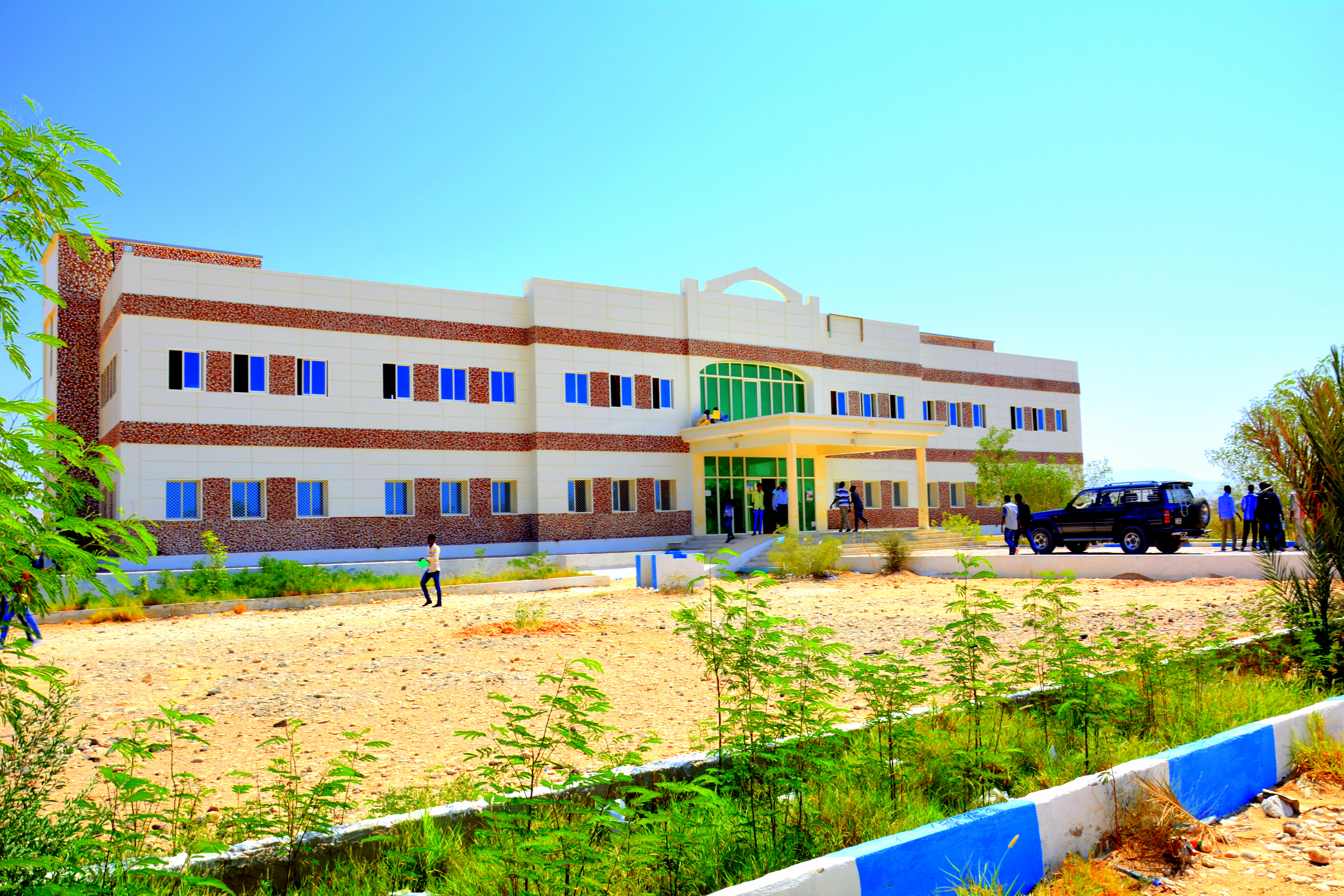
East Africa University Headquarters

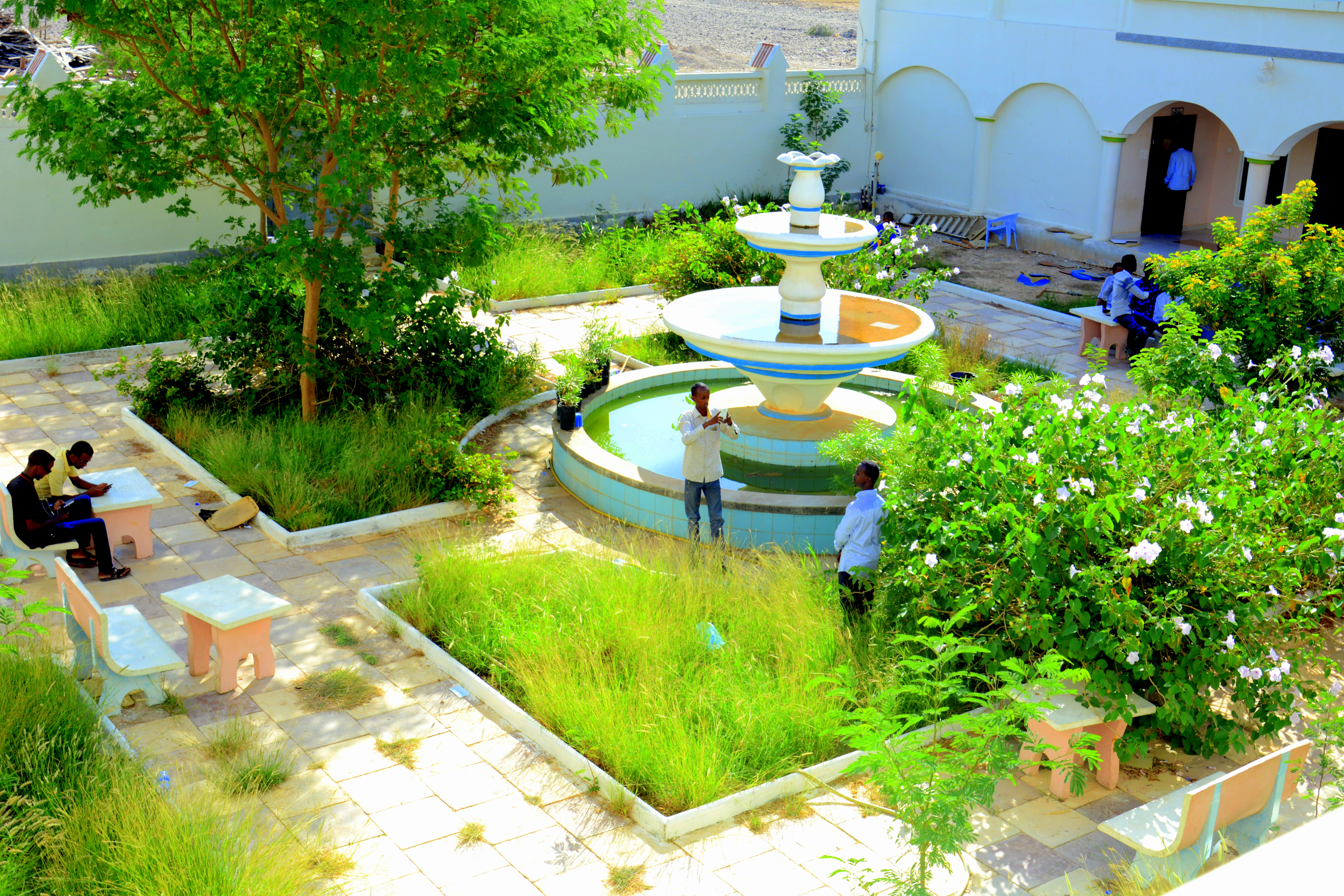
East Africa University Headquarters

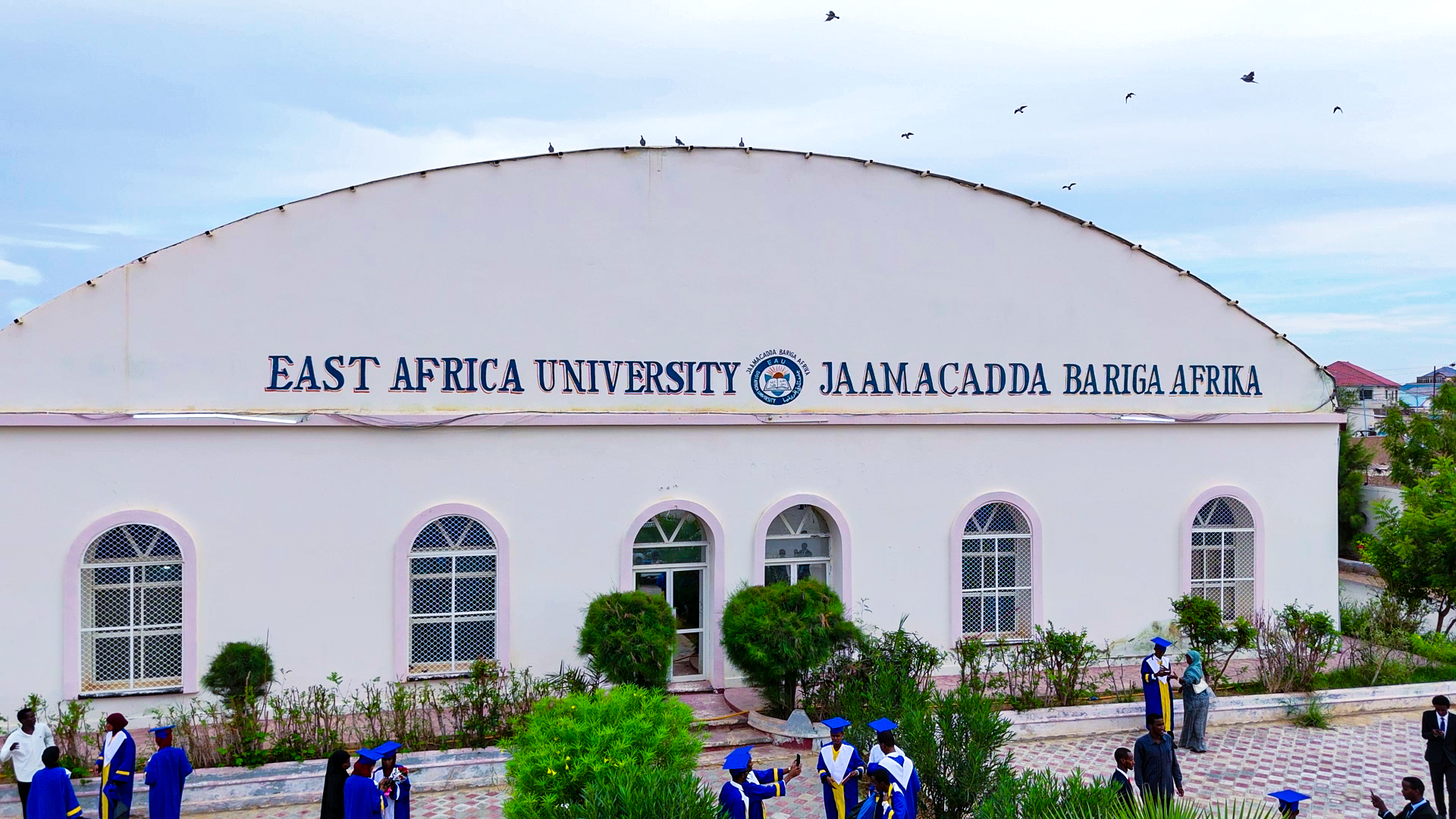
Garowe Campus

== Overview ==
A former Bender Qassim University institution, East Africa University was established in 1999 in Bosaso by a group of Somali. It began offering courses in October of the year to around 500 students.

A formal foundation laying ceremony for the college's original campus, situated about 5 kilometres (3.1 mi) from the city center, was held in March 2000. It was attended by Puntland government officials, business and civil society groups, as well as many civilians. The first batch of students completed degree requirements in February 2005 and graduated several months later, in June.

EAU initially offered courses in two main areas: Arabic and Islamic studies, as well as business administration in the college set aside for the purpose. It later grew to include more intensive language courses. Additional professors were subsequently hired to accommodate the broadened syllabus.

EAU offers various programs and diplomas to Somalia's undergraduate students.

== Branches ==
East Africa University headquarter is based in Bosaso, situated in Bari Region in Puntland. However, it has since expanded operations and opened up new branches in Erigavo, Galdogob, Galkayo, Buhoodle, Garowe, Burtinle, and Qardho. On 18 April 2012, the university opened a seventh branch in Buhodle to serve pupils from the Ayn region.

On 18 March 2013, the Puntland government donated land in Garowe to facilitate the institution's growth in the administrative capital.

== Programs and degrees ==
As of 2013, the university's Bosaso campus focuses on business and social sciences. Its Galkayo branch concentrates on computer science and engineering, in addition to health science.

Four or five year bachelor degrees are presented to all undergraduate students upon successful completion of course requirements. The Higher Institute of Health Science on the Galkayo campus likewise offers two-year general nursing and medical laboratory diplomas.

In order to develop the capacity of the Puntland government's statistics department, the university also provides short courses for the Puntland Ministry of Planning and International Cooperation. These classes are structured along two phases, each held during the afternoon over a period of four months.

Additionally, the institution offers short courses earmarked for legal professionals.

== Faculties/Departments ==
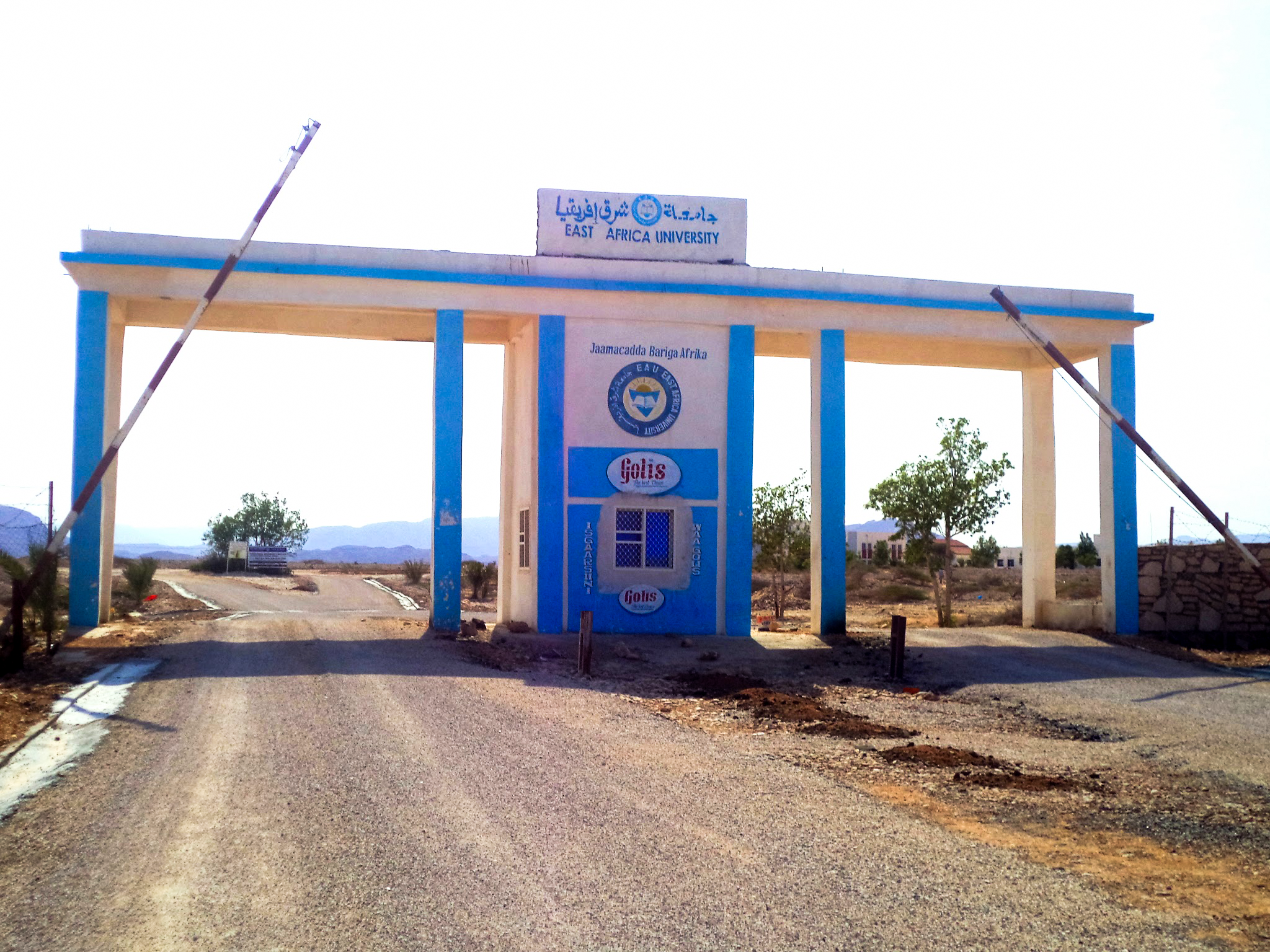
The Entrance of The Headquarters in Bosaso

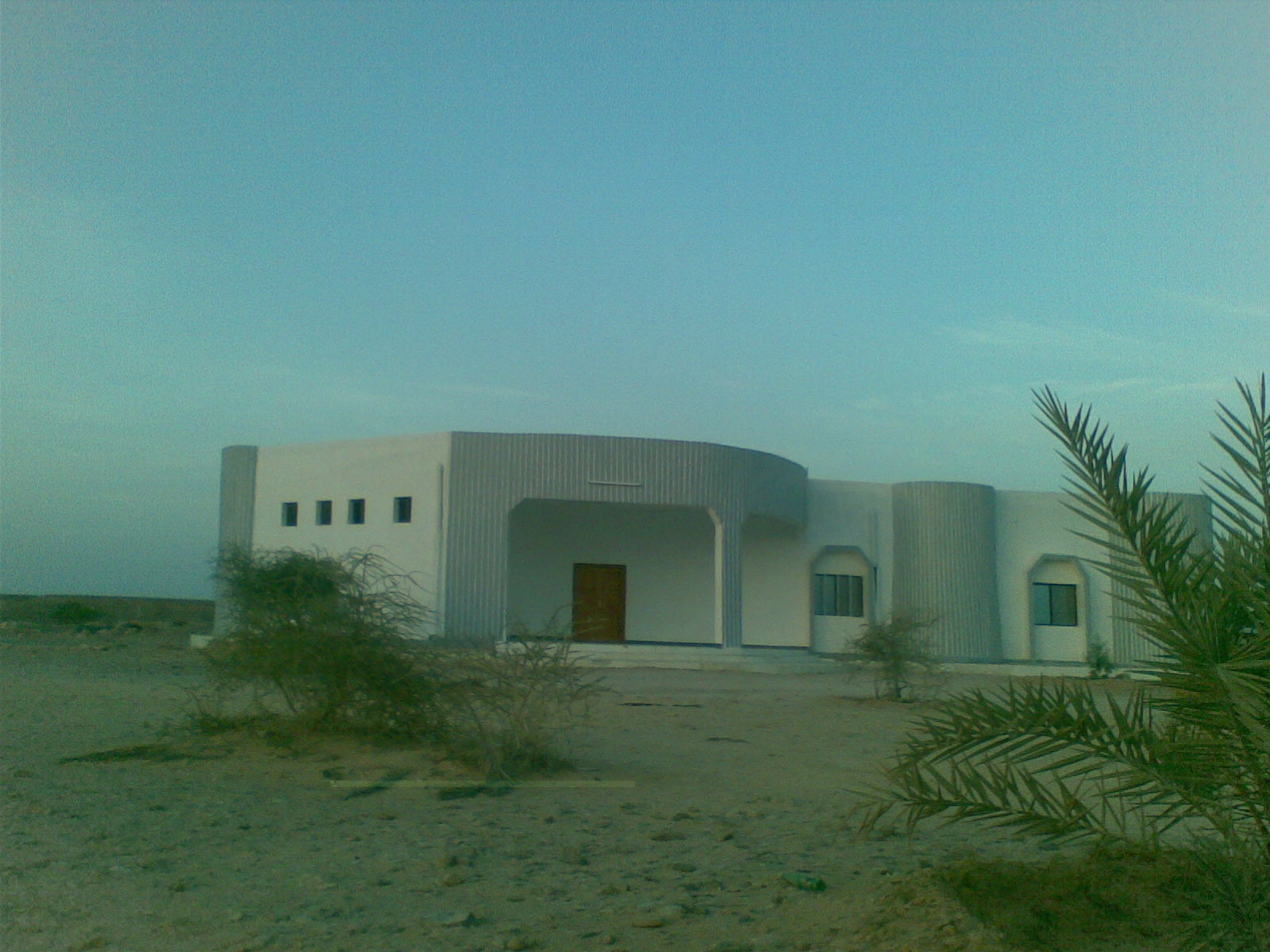
Alternate entrance to East Africa University's Bosaso campus.

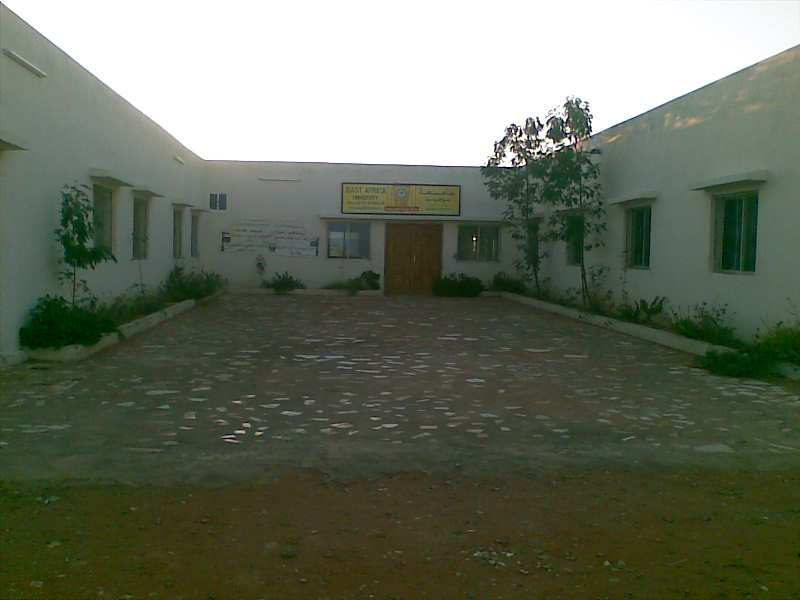
EAU's Galkayo campus, one of its three branches in Puntland.

EAU provides bachelor's degree courses in nine undergraduate faculties. These departments include:

Core faculties

- Faculty of Social Science and Economics
- Faculty of Administration and Management
- Faculty of Shariah and Islamic Studies
- Faculty of Information Science and Technogy
- Faculty of Education and Science
- Faculty of Medicine and Health Science
- Faculty of Engineering
- Faculty of Veterinary and Agriculture
- Faculty of Marine, Environment and Earth Sciences

Academic Programs

- Bachelor of Business Administration
- Bachelor of Sharia and Islamic Studies
- Bachelor of Computer Science
- Bachelor of Education
- Bachelor of Economics
- Bachelor of Engineering
- Bachelor of Veterinary
- Bachelor of Community Development
- Bachelor of Medicine

Galkacyo campus

- Faculty of Business Administration
- Faculty of Shariah and Islamic Studies
- Faculty of Computer Science
- Bachelor of Community Development
- Faculty of Health Sciences

- Nursing Department - Public Health Department - Medical Laboratory

- Faculty of Economics
- Faculty of Education
  - Semester-based
  - Three-year duration
  - Four - Year Duration
  - Bachelor degree
- Higher Institute of Languages (English - Arabic)
  - One-year duration

== Virtual Distance Electronic Learning Center ==
Besides classroom-based education, the university offers distance learning through its Virtual Distance Electronic Learning Center (VDEL). The VDEL program aims to facilitate access to an international pool of knowledge; offer standard education through information technology; fulfil local demands in terms of education, professional courses and training; offer online classes to complete and enhance extant courses; simplify delivery of additional learning materials to undergraduate and postgraduate students; deploy institutional resources to contribute to national and communal development; make use of digital libraries; connect with other global online universities; and attract further collaborative endeavours with other international organizations.

== Funding ==
Funding for the university comes from both local and international contributors.
