= Abdoul Nassirou Omouroun =

Togolese footballer

Nass Omouroun
Personal information
- Full name: Abdoul Nassirou Omouroun
- Date of birth: 12 July 1987 (age 39)
- Place of birth: Lomé, Togo
- Height: 1.80 m (5 ft 11 in)
- Position: Goalkeeper

Team information
- Current team: AS Togo-Port
- Number: 16

Youth career
- 2003–2005: AS Togo-Port

Senior career*
Years	Team	Apps	(Gls)
2006–	AS Togo-Port	34	(0)

International career^{‡}
2007–	Togo	3	(0)
- * Club domestic league appearances and goals ‡ National team caps and goals as of 13:44, 21 October 2008 (UTC)

Abdoul Nassirou Omouroun (born 12 July 1987) is a Togolese footballer currently playing for AS Togo-Port.
