= Kenneth Menkhaus =

Kenneth Menkhaus is a political scientist who is a professor at Davidson College in North Carolina, where he has taught since 1991. Menkhaus's publications include the book Somalia: State Collapse and the Threat of Terrorism (2004) and the article "Governance without Government in Somalia" in the journal International Security (2007). He is a specialist on Somalia and the Horn of Africa. Menkhaus was a Fulbright Scholar during his PhD research on Somalia. He subsequently taught for two years at the American University in Cairo, between 1989 and 1991, and between 1993 and 1994 was a special political advisor for the UN Operation in Somalia. He was visiting civilian professor at the US Army Peacekeeping Institute in 1994–95, and visiting scholar at the US Army Strategic Studies Institute in 2011–12.
