= Abdul Nasser Bani Hani =

Jordanian politician

Abdul Nasser Bani Hani also known as Abu Jamal (died 6 October 2013) was a Jordanian politician. Bani Hani was chosen in the Parliamentary elections of 2010 and served in the 16th Parliament of Jordan in the House of Representatives as a representative of the First District of Irbid Governorate. His term ended when new elections were held early 2013.

== Death ==
Bani Hani was killed on 6 October 2013 during a tribal clash in Al Barha District, Irbid. Bani Hani was in the process of breaking up a group of young men and calming people down when he was shot in the stomach. A total of seven persons were shot in the clashes, including a brother of Bani Hani. Jordan's Interior Minister, Hussein Al-Majali, said that the likely suspect was taken into custody.
