= Abdul Nasir (Khyber Pakhtunkhwa cricketer) =

Pakistani cricketer (born 1983)

Personal information
- Full name: Abdul Nasir
- Born: 15 December 1983 (age 42); Peshawar, North-West Frontier Province, Pakistan
- Batting: Right-handed
- Bowling: Right arm medium
- Source: ESPNcricinfo, 14 February 2020

Abdul Nasir (born 15 December 1983) is a Pakistani cricketer. He made his first-class debut in the 2000–01 season.
