= List of universities and colleges in Somaliland =

This is a list of universities and colleges in Somaliland. It includes both public and private institutions.

Name	City	Language	Est.	Students			Notes
Name	City	Language	Est.	Undergrad.	Postgrad.	Total	Notes
Barwaaqo University	Baliga Cas	English	2017	134	0	134	3 Faculties
Amoud University	Borama Hargeisa	English	1998	37,140	5,300	42,440	11 Faculties
University of Hargeisa	Hargeisa	English	2000	5,000	3,460	5,000	9 Faculties
Somaliland University of Technology	Hargeisa	English	2000	18,897	0	18,897	7 Faculties
Edna University Hospital	Hargeisa	English	2003	24,768	0	24,768	4 Faculties
Burao University	Burao	English	2004	31,904	7,598	39,502	10 Faculties
The Unity University	Hargeisa	English	2021	2,320	6,540	29,860	4 Faculties
Gollis University	Hargeisa Berbera Burao Gabiley	English	2005	7,930	300	8,230	7 Faculties
Osman Guelleh Farah University-OGFU	Hargeisa	English	2024				
Admas University College–Hargeisa	Hargeisa	English	2006				3 Faculties
International Horn University	Hargeisa	English	2006				5 Faculties
Addisababa Medical University	Hargeisa Burao	English	2008				2 Faculties
Hope University	Hargeisa	English	2008				2 Faculties
Alpha University	Hargeisa Berbera Burao	English	2009				3 Faculties
Sanaag University of Science and Technology	Erigavo	English	2009				3 Faculties
Tima-ade University	Gabiley	English	2009				3 Faculties
New Generation University College	Hargeisa	English	2010				3 Faculties
Abaarso Tech University	Hargeisa	English	2010				2 Faculties
Addis University College	Burao	English	2011				2 Faculties
Berbera Marine University	Berbera	English	2012				
Ilays National University	Las Anod	English	2012				
Maakhir University	Badhan	English	2009				
Nugaal University	Las Anod	English	2004				
Africa College	Somaliland	English	2021				
Iqra Institute for Higher Education	Badhan	English	2008				
Sahal University	Las Anod	English	2017				
