= Barwaaqo University =

Women's university in Somaliland

Coordinates: 9.82375°N 44.09228°E

Barwaaqo University (Somali: Jaamacada Barwaaqo, Arabic: جامعة برواقو, abbreviated BU) is a non-profit women's university in Somaliland. It’s a member of the Abaarso Network, along with the Abaarso School of Science and Technology and Kaabe Schools.

The university is Somaliland's first residential women's university.. The campus is located near Baliga Cas, around 30 kilometers North of Hargeisa.

== History ==
Ava Ramberg and Jonathan Starr co-founded BU in Fall 2017.. The first class graduated in Spring 2021. President Muse Bihi Abdi delivered the first Commencement address..

== Our Mission ==
Barwaaqo University’s mission is to empower Somali women to become professionals who drive development in their communities.

== Campus ==
Facilities on campus are divided into two quadrangles: the student one and the faculty one. Outside these two quadrangles are the community school, soldier buildings, and a mosque.

The architect who designed the faculty quadrangle and the community school is Stephen Finney. He had previously designed the buildings of Kaabe in New Hargeisa..

== Leadership ==
Barwaaqo University current president is Debra Boss with it is Vice President being Abdirashiid Muxumed Hassan.

== Academics ==
BU offers the following three degrees:

1. Bachelor of Education in English Studies
2. Bachelor of Education with Montessori Specialization
3. Bachelor of Arts in English for International Communications ( It was discontinued 2025+)
4. Bachelor of Education with Secondary Humanities Specialization

For the 2022–2026 academic year, the actual cost of tuition, room, and board for was USD 3,500.

Organisations and private donors provide scholarships.

== Admissions ==
To receive a place at BU, prospective students must sit an entrance exam, submit an essay, and provide a high-school certificate.

== Student life ==
Students live on campus in one of several houses. Up to four students share each of the current 48 student dorm rooms.

Students participate in clubs and sports. Among the clubs are the Islamic Club and the Xisaab (Maths) Club.

As of Spring 2026, there are various clubs such as Garden Club, Spelling Bee Club, Drama Club and Hiking Club.

Among the sports are Running and Basketball.

As of Spring 2026, the sports are Football, Basketball and Volleyball.

Students also participate in community service. For example, Barwaaqo Gives Back is a volunteer programme which happens over school breaks (summer, winter, and Ramadan). Students apply and are placed at a school in their city. To date, students have collectively worked in all six regions of The Republic of Somaliland.

== Student body ==
As of Spring 2026, students from all six regions of Somaliland as well as students from abroad make up the student body.

Typically, the number of students enrolled is approximately 150 students.

== See also ==
- Education in Somaliland
- List of universities and colleges in Somaliland
- List of women's colleges
