= Ahmed Aw Dahir =

Ahmed Aw Dahir (Axmed Daahir Xaaji Xasan) was the mayor of Las Anod, the capital city in the Sool region of Somaliland, from 2007 to July 17, 2011.

== Mayor of Las Anod ==
In October 2007, Las Anod, which had been effectively controlled by Puntland, was taken over by Somaliland forces.

In December 2007, Mayor Ahmed Dahir announced that the Las Anod city executive has begun collecting city taxes. He also denied the elders' claim that Somaliland's control of Las Anod was done without the consent of Ras Lnod elders. He also stated that the security situation in Las Anod is generally calm, but there are occasional shootings, which are being investigated.

In October 2008, Mayor Ahmed Dahir attends the 5th anniversary celebration of Nugaal University in Las Anod.

In June 2011, Ahmed Dahir was arrested by Somaliland police. The arrest was ordered by the Sool Regional Commission, which includes the Director of Intelligence, Ahmed Abdi Habsade, who changed his affiliation from Puntland to Somaliland in 2007. However, Secretary Habsade did not disclose the reason for the arrest. According to other sources, Mayor Ahmed Dahir is also suspected of involvement in the shootings in Las Anod city and of meeting with leaders of the anti-Somaliland group HBM-SSC. Ahmed Dahir was the first person arrested in a series of shootings in Las Anod city. Ahmed Dahir was later released, but his mayoralty was dismissed.
