= SOS Sheikh Secondary School =

School in Sahil, Somaliland

Pharo Secondary School, Sheikh
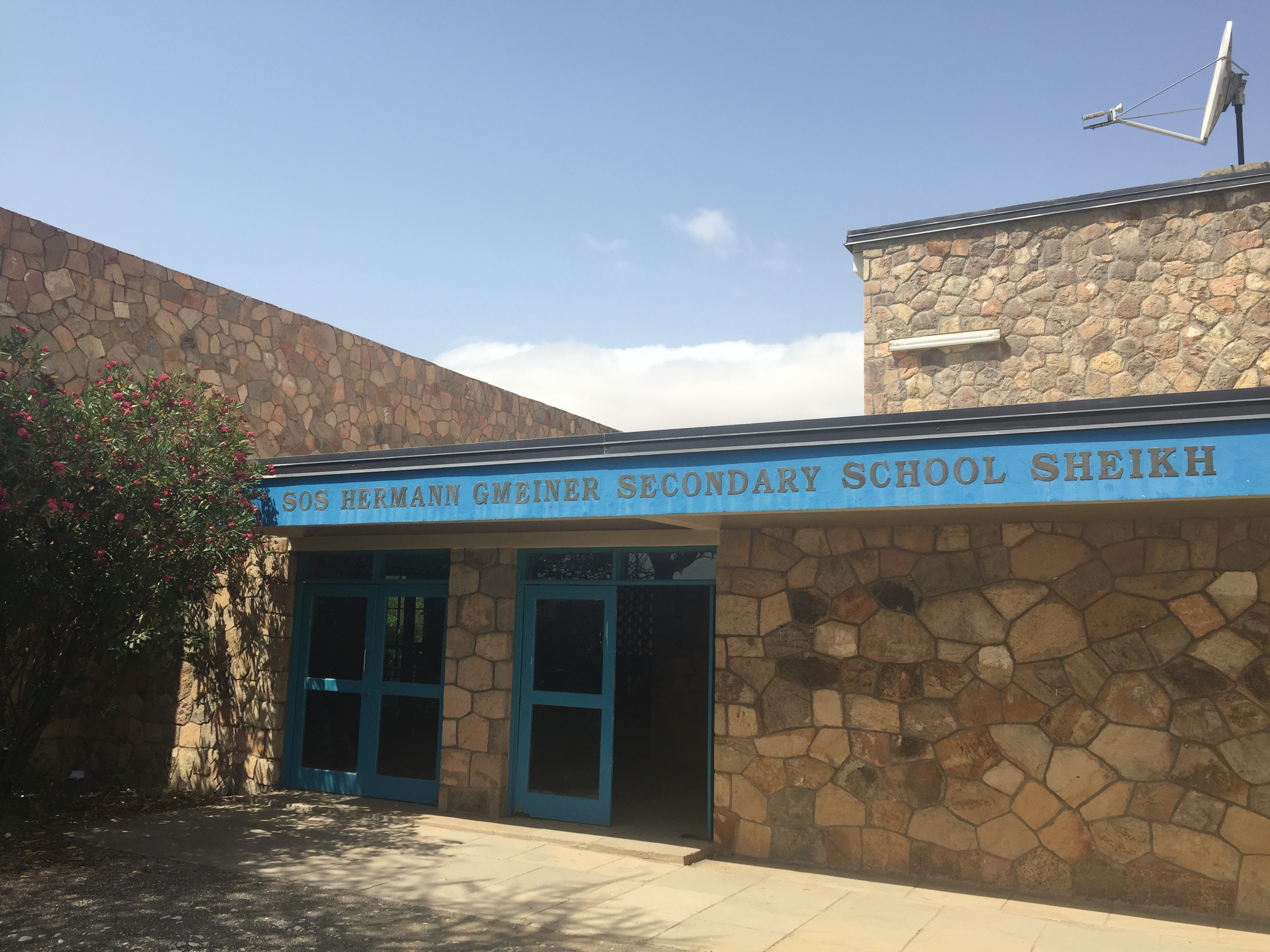

Location
- Sheikh; Somaliland
- Coordinates: 9.931°N 45.176°E

Information
- Website: www.pharofoundation.org

Pharo Secondary School, Sheikh (formerly known as SOS Sheikh Secondary School or SOS Hermann Gmeiner Sheikh Secondary School) is situated near the town of Sheikh, a three-hour drive from Hargeisa, the capital of the unrecognized state of Somaliland. The once-renowned boarding school was established in British Somaliland and at independence was considered one of the top schools in the country. It is the birth-place of Somalia's former anthem, Soomaaliyeey toosoo, which was composed by the teachers of Sheikh Secondary School. The school accepted a mere 50 students each year for the 31 years (1958–89) before it was destroyed by the Siad Barre regime, admitting 1,550 people over three decades. It was mostly destroyed in fighting in 1989, and had fallen into further disrepair during the Somali Civil War.

In September 2002, Dick and Enid Eyeington moved to Somaliland to take on the restoration and running of this derelict boarding school. Following years of closure, the SOS Sheikh Secondary School reopened in January 2003 to its first 53 pupils, 45 boys and 8 girls. Another 50 pupils arrived in September 2003.

The first Somali principal of the school after the British was Ghalib Musa Afi. This school is currently double curriculum, Somaliland curriculum and IGCSE curriculum. The current school principal is Mr. Adam Muse, who tirelessly works with the Students.

== History ==
Sheikh School offered free tuition based on a British curriculum to the limited number of students admitted to the establishment solely on merit. As a result, the privately funded school attracted the highest male achievers in Somaliland who would go on to become the future leaders of the country. Although, a selective school that offered entry on the basis of students’ exam marks, Richard Darlington who served as headmaster (mid-1950s–1971) ensured that the student body should be inclusive of Somaliland communities (although only their male members).

== Alumni ==
- Muhammad Haji Ibrahim Egal
- Ahmed Mohamed Mohamoud
- Abdirahman Aw Ali
- Abdirahman Mohamed Abdullahi
- Hussein Abdi Dualeh
- Jama Ali Korshel
- Ali Khalif Galaydh

== See also ==
- Somaliland
- Education in Somaliland
- List of schools in Somaliland
