= Osman Saleban Jama =

Somaliland politician

Osman Saleban Jama (Osman Suleiman Jama, Cismaan saleebaan Jaamac) was the mayor of Las Anod, the capital city in the Sool region of Somaliland, from 3 April 2015 to 16 January 2017.

== Mayor of Las Anod ==
On April 3, 2015, the Las Anod City Council dismissed Mayor Abdikadir Jama Salah after 16 votes in favor, 1 vote against, and 2 abstentions. And the city council appointed Osman Sareban as mayor after 18 votes in favor and one vote against. The change of government took place peacefully and Abdikadir Jama promised to cooperate with Osman Sareban.

On May 18, 2015, on the 24th anniversary of the founding of Somaliland, Governor Sool thanked the citizens of Las Anod, the mayor and the council for their contributions to Somaliland.

In December 2015, Somaliland's Energy Ministry announced it would donate Solar Street lights to Las Anod, for which Mayor Osman Saleban was grateful.

In March 2016, Mayor Osman Saleban criticized politicians in the Sool region appointed by the Somaliland government for not being proactive in promoting solar energy projects in Las Anod.

In April 2016, Las Anod City Councilor Fahiima Quuje accused Mayor Osman Saleban of corruption.

In December 2016, Mayor Osman Saleban's bodyguard injured Councilor Las Anood in connection with the drought measures that hit the district.

On January 15, 2017, Mayor Osman Sareban was removed from office after failing to receive a vote of confidence from the Las Anod council. Abdiaziz Hussein Hassan was appointed as his successor as mayor.

== After Resignation ==
In September 2017, Osman Saleban, who had previously supported the Justice and Welfare Party(UCID), changed his supporting party to the Waddani Party.
