= List of schools in Somaliland =

This is a list of notable schools located in Somaliland by region.

== Primary and secondary education ==
Education in Somaliland is provided in public and private schools. Education in Somaliland is managed by Ministry of Education and Science which controls the development and administration of state schools, it also has an advisory and supervisory role in private schools.

== Awdal ==
- British International College & School https://britishinternationalcolleges.com/
- Sh. Ali Jawhar Secondary School Borama
- A.H. Cardaale Secondary School, Borama
- Aayatiin Secondary School, Borama
- MBK International School, Borama
- Ubaya Binu Ka'ab Secondary School, Borama
- Al Huda Primary and Secondary School, Borama
- Omer Binu Khadab Secondary School, Borama
- Waaberi School, Borama
- Al-Aqsa Secondary School, Borama
- East Africa Star School, Borama
- Harawa secondary school (Borama)
- Iftin primary school (Borama)
- Shelmi Talan secondary school (Qunujeed)
- Al-Qalam secondary School, (Borama)

== Maroodi Jeex ==
- British International College & School, Hargeisa https://britishinternationalcolleges.com/
- Best Academy, Hargeisa
- AL furqaan School
- Asal Primary School
- AMAANO BOARDING AND DAY SCHOOL, Hargeisa https://amaanoboarding.com/
- Abu Huraira High School, Hargeisa
- Noradin School, Hargeisa
- British Canadian International School, Hargeisa
- Today School, Hargeisa
- Tomorrow School Hargeisa
- Tawhid Secondary School, Hargeisa
- ELM Schools, Hargeisa
- Damal KG and Primary School, Hargeisa
- Sky Schools, Hargeisa
- Scie Tech Academy, Hargeisa
- Kuwait Educational Charity Complex for Girls, Hargeisa
- Bahrain Secondary School, Hargeisa
- Future Secondary School, Hargeisa
- Ilays School, Hargeisa
- Gaandi Secondary School, Hargeisa
- Pharo KG and Primary School, Hargeisa
- Mohamed Adan Sheef Secondary School, Hargeisa
- Farah Omaar Secondary School, Hargeisa
- British Islamic Academy, Hargeisa
- Dayib Gurey Secondary School, Hargeisa
- Salaama Secondary School, Hargeisa
- Mu'assasatu Aflax, Hargeisa
- Al-Huda Primary and Intermediate School, Hargeisa
- Al Irshaad Secondary School, Hargeisa
- Taj International School, Hargeisa
- Ubax International School, KG & Primary School Hargeisa
- Hamdan Secondary School, Hargeisa
- Abaarso School of Science and Technology, Abaarso
- Arabsiyo Secondary School, Arabsiyo
- Badbaado Secondary School, Arabsiyo
- Qalax High Comprehensive Secondary School, Gabiley
- Shaafici Secondary School, Gebiley
- Mahdi Ali Primary School, Tog Wajaale
- 26 June secondary school, Hargeisa
- Al Daarayn Modern School, Hargeisa
- Shibrahim shyusuf shmadar[ex ga'an libah] secondary school, Hargeisa
- Blooming Secondary School, Hargeisa
- Zaynab Mukhtar Primary School [Hargeisa]
- Sunshine First Schools, Hargeisa
- SuMaya School of Adiquite [Hargeisa]
- Nuurayn secondary school [Hargeisa]
- Jiil Ajadiid Schools, Hargeisa
- Rising Star School of Sciences and Creative Arts, Hargeisa
- Alifdoon Primary School, Hargeisa
- Sheikh Bashir School, Hargeisa
- Turkish Maarif Schools, Hargeisa

== Sahil ==
- Pharo Secondary School, Sheikh, Somaliland
- Bursade Secondary School, Berbera
- C/Salam Secondary School, Berbera
- Secondary School, Berbera
- Salwa Sabah Secondary School, Sheikh
- Dabayl Wayne Secondary School, Berbera
- Imam Shafi’ Primary & Intermediate School, Berbera
- Umar ibn al-Khattab Primary & Intermediate School, Berbera
- Sahil Primary & Intermediate School, Berbera
- Hasan Ali Awale Primary & Intermediate School, Berbera
- Mujahid Umar Toori Primary & Intermediate School, Berbera
- Mohamed Shire Gaab Secondary School, Sheikh
- Sa’id Da’ud Primary & Intermediate School, Berbera
- Mahmoud Handulle Primary & Intermediate School, Berbera

== Sanaag ==
- Haji Adan Secondary School, Erigavo
- Safa Primary & Secondary School, Erigavo
- Shaafici Primary & Secondary School, Erigavo
- Dayaxa Secondary School, Erigavo
- Yufle Secondary School, Yufle
- Daalo Primary School, Erigavo
- Dayaxa Boarding Secondary School, Dayaha
- Abdi Hussein Mataan Secondary School, Erigavo
- Imamu Malik Secondary School, Erigavo
- Surud Primary School, Erigavo
- xidig secondary school {Erigavo}
- jeembar primary and intermediate school {Erigavo}
- dayaxa primary school {Erigavo}

== Sool ==
- Muse Yusuf Secondary School, Las Anod
- Gateway Secondary School, Las Anod
- Ilays Educational Academy, Las Anod
- Nugaal Secondary School, Las Anod
- Jeerin Secondary School, Taleh
- Tukaraq Secondary School, Tukaraq
- Yagoori Secondary school, Yagoori

== Togdheer ==
- Burao Academy of Science and Technology, Burao
- Dhoqoshay Primary and Secondary School, Burao
- Smart Schools, Burao
- Sheikh Bashir School, Burao
- Qaadi-Mahamud School, Burao
- Sheikh Ibrahim School, Burao
- Ilays School, Burao
- Iftin Primary School, Burao
- Togdheer Secondary School, Burao
- Dayaxa Secondary School, Burao
- Albayaan School, Burao
- Geeska Africa Secondary School, Burao
- wadajir secondary school,Burao
- Qoryaale Secondary school
- Dhagaxdher Secondary school
- Odweyne Boarding School, Oodweyne
- Darwiish School, Bohotle
- Hawd Secondary School, Bohotle
- Abu Bakar AlSidiiq School, Bohotle

== See also ==
- Education in Somaliland
- Ministry of Education and Science (Somaliland)
- Lists of schools Marif Secondary schools
