= Mohamed Yusuf Jama =

Somali politician

President of Khatumo
- In office 26 May 2012 – 1 September 2016
- Preceded by: Ahmed Elmi Osman; Abdinuur Elmi Qaaji
- Succeeded by: Ali Khalif Galaydh

Personal details
- Born: Las Anod, Somalia
- Party: Independent

Mohamed Yusuf Jama (Somali: Maxamed Yuusuf Jaamac) commonly called Indhosheel is a Somali politician. He was governor of Mudug and the president of Khatumo State.

On 18 March 2014, he arrived in Mogadishu to break off Khatumo's relationship with the Federal Government of Somalia.

On 2 August 2018, he accused Somaliland of being behind the suicide bombing attack in Buuhoodle the previous day.

== See also ==
- Politics of Somalia
