= Hussein Abdi Dualeh =

Somaliland politician and petroleum engineer

Hussein Abdi Dualeh Xuseen Cabdi Ducaale
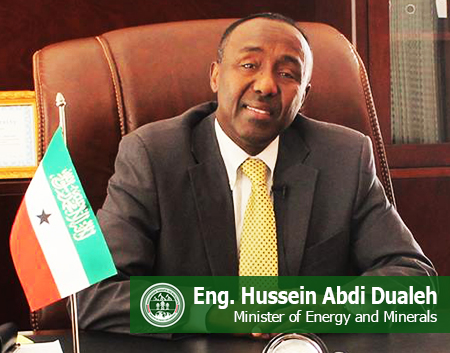

Minister of Energy and Minerals
- In office 27 July 2010 – 14 December 2017
- President: Ahmed Mahamoud Silanyo
- Preceded by: Kassim Sheikh Yusuf
- Succeeded by: Jama Mohamoud Egal

Personal details
- Born: Sool, Somaliland
- Party: Peace, Unity, and Development Party
- Spouse: Faryad Ali (1990-present)
- Children: 3
- Education: SOS Sheikh Secondary School; University of Oklahoma

Hussein Abdi Dualeh (Somali: Xuseen Cabdi Duaale) is a Somaliland politician and petroleum engineer. He is the former Minister of Energy & Minerals of Somaliland.

== Biography ==
Hussein Dualeh was born in 1957 in the Saraar region of British Somaliland.

At the age of five, he moved with his family to Aden in South Yemen. Upon returning he completed secondary education at SOS Sheikh Secondary School. After graduation he was hired by ADNOC selling lubricants and gasoline.

Hussein Dualeh studied petroleum engineering at the University of Oklahoma and graduated with a degree in 1983. And later worked for several American companies including five years Chevron Corporation, and California's Metropolitan Transport Authority between 1989 and 2010.

He later joined the Peace, Unity, and Development Party and became chairman of the party's North American chapter, and was even naturalised as an American citizen.

=== Minister of Mining, Energy & Water Resources ===
In 2010, Hussein Dualeh returned to his homeland at the request of the Somaliland government. He said that when he left his job in California to return to Somaliland, many people mistakenly thought he was going back to Somalia, and he explained that he was returning to peaceful Somaliland, not Somalia.

On July 28, 2010, President Silanyo announced his cabinet appointments, naming Hussein Dualeh as Minister of Mining, Energy & Water Resources.

In January 2013, Hussein Dualeh said he was working on oil exploration in Somaliland and hoped to transform the port of Berbera into an international fuel shipping hub.

February 2014, Hussein Dualeh visited South Africa to attend the African Mining Conference. In an interview with Reuters, he stated, “What Somaliland needs is not aid but investment, and we are actively courting South Africa's Junior & Emerging Miners.” In an interview with Mining Weekly, he said Somaliland may hold deposits of uranium, platinum, rare-earth metals, gold, copper, iron ore, coal, manganese, tin and gemstones, as well as tantalite, columbite, feldspar, kaolin, kyanite, lead, quartz crystals and glass sand.

In April 2014, the prominent Somaliland newspaper Haatuf published articles accusing Energy Minister Hussein Dualeh and Interior Minister Ali Mohamed Warancadde of corruption and embezzlement; Somaliland police then raided Haatuf's offices and shut the paper down on the orders of the Hargeisa Regional Court. Haatuf's media license was ultimately revoked.

In December 2016, Somaliland's Ministry of Energy and Minerals, led by Hussein Dualeh, jointly organized a two-day energy-sector workshop in Berbera with the United States Agency for International Development (USAID) and UKaid; he said its aim was to improve public access to cheap and quality electricity supply in the country.

In December 2017, Somaliland's Minister of Energy and Minerals changed from Hussein Dualeh to Jama Mohamoud Egal.

== Personal life ==
Dualeh lived in Stevenson Ranch, California with his wife and three children until he relocated to Hargeisa to fulfill his duties as Minister of Mining, Energy & Water Resources of Somaliland.
