= Naval academy =

Training institution for naval officers

A naval academy provides education for prospective naval officers. A naval academy, or naval war college, is a military institution that provides training to a country's naval forces, its students, and its future officers. It trains personnel for professions such as marines, armorers, gunners, engineers, technicians, logistics specialists, communications and information systems specialists, and naval military police. Aviation options include pilot training, naval aviation, air command and control, air defense, naval aviation maintenance, and aircraft supply.

== List of naval academies ==
Region	Location	Academy	Navy
Africa	Abu Qir, Egypt	Egyptian Naval Academy	Egyptian Navy
Africa	Mogadishu, Somalia	Camp TURKSOM	Somali Navy
Africa	Berbera, Somaliland	Berbera Marine College	Somaliland Coast Guard
Africa	South Africa	South African Naval College	South African Navy
Americas	Ensenada, Buenos Aires Province, Argentina	Escuela Naval Militar	Argentine Navy
Americas	Rio de Janeiro, Brazil	Naval School (Brazil)	Brazilian Navy
Americas	Kingston, Ontario, Canada	Royal Military College of Canada	Royal Canadian Navy
Americas	Antón Lizardo, Veracruz, Mexico	Heroica Escuela Naval Militar	Mexican Navy
Americas	La Punta, Callao, Peru	Peruvian Naval School	Peruvian Navy
Americas	Annapolis, Maryland, United States	United States Naval Academy	United States Navy, United States Marine Corps
Americas	Montevideo, Uruguay	Uruguay Naval Academy (ESNAL)	National Navy of Uruguay
Americas	Venezuela	Military Academy of the Bolivarian Navy	Bolivarian Navy of Venezuela
Asia	Azerbaijan	Azerbaijan Higher Naval Academy	Azerbaijan Navy
Asia	Patenga, Chittagong, Bangladesh	Bangladesh Naval Academy	Bangladesh Navy
Asia	Dalian, Liaoning, China	Dalian Naval Academy	People's Liberation Army Navy
Asia	Ezhimala, Kerala, India	Indian Naval Academy (INA)	Indian Navy
Asia	Surabaya, East Java, Indonesia	Indonesian Naval Academy (AAL)	Indonesian Navy
Asia	Noshahr, Mazandaran Province, Iran	Imam Khomeini Naval University of Noshahr	Islamic Republic of Iran Navy
Asia	Haifa, Israel	Israeli Naval Academy	Israeli Navy
Asia	Etajima, Hiroshima, Japan	Naval Academy Etajima	Japan Maritime Self-Defense Force
Asia	Aktau, Kazakhstan	Aktau Naval Academy	Kazakh Naval Forces
Asia	Jounieh, Keserwan District, Lebanon	Lebanese Army Naval Academy	Lebanese Navy
Asia	Hamhung, North Korea	Kim Jong-suk Naval Academy	Korean People's Navy
Asia	Karachi, Pakistan	Pakistan Naval Academy	Pakistani Navy
Asia	San Narciso, Zambales, Philippines	Philippine Merchant Marine Academy (PMMA)	Philippine Navy
Asia	Jubail, Saudi Arabia	King Fahd Naval Academy	Royal Saudi Navy
Asia	Singapore	Officer Cadet School (Singapore)	Republic of Singapore Navy
Asia	Jinhae, South Korea	Korea Naval Academy	Republic of Korea Navy
Asia	Trincomalee, Sri Lanka	Naval and Maritime Academy	Sri Lanka Navy
Asia	Kaohsiung, Taiwan	Republic of China Naval Academy	Republic of China Navy
Asia	Samut Prakan, Thailand	Royal Thai Naval Academy	Royal Thai Navy
Asia	Turkmenbashi, Turkmenistan	Turkmen Naval Institute	Turkmen Naval Forces
Asia	Nha Trang, Vietnam	Vietnam Naval Academy	Vietnam People's Navy
Europe	Varna, Bulgaria	Nikola Vaptsarov Naval Academy	Bulgarian Navy
Europe	Copenhagen, Denmark	Royal Danish Naval Academy	Royal Danish Navy
Europe	Lanvéoc-Poulmic, France	École navale	French Navy
Europe	Mürwik, Germany	Mürwik Naval School	German Navy
Europe	Piraeus, Greece	Hellenic Naval Academy	Hellenic Navy
Europe	(Republic of Ireland) Haulbowline, Ireland	Naval College (Ireland)	Irish Naval Service
Europe	Livorno, Italy	Italian Naval Academy	Italian Navy
Europe	Den Helder, Netherlands	Royal Naval College (Netherlands)	Royal Netherlands Navy
Europe	Laksevåg, Bergen, Norway	Royal Norwegian Naval Academy	Royal Norwegian Navy
Europe	Gdynia, Poland	Polish Naval Academy	Polish Navy
Europe	Almada, Portugal	Naval School (Portugal)	Portuguese Navy
Europe	Constanța, Romania	Mircea cel Bătrân Naval Academy	Romanian Navy
Europe	St. Petersburg, Russia	Kuznetsov Naval Academy	Russian Navy
Europe	Marín, Spain	Naval Military Academy	Spanish Navy
Europe	Täby, Sweden	Royal Swedish Naval Academy	Swedish Navy
Europe	Istanbul, Turkey	Turkish Naval Academy	Turkish Naval Forces
Europe	Odesa, Ukraine	National University «Odesa Maritime Academy»	Ukrainian Navy
Europe	Dartmouth, United Kingdom	Britannia Royal Naval College	Royal Navy
Oceania	Jervis Bay Territory, Australia	Royal Australian Naval College, HMAS Creswell	Royal Australian Navy

== See also ==
- Military academy
