= Ali Khalif Galaydh =

Somali politician (1941–2020)

- Cali Khaliif Galaydh
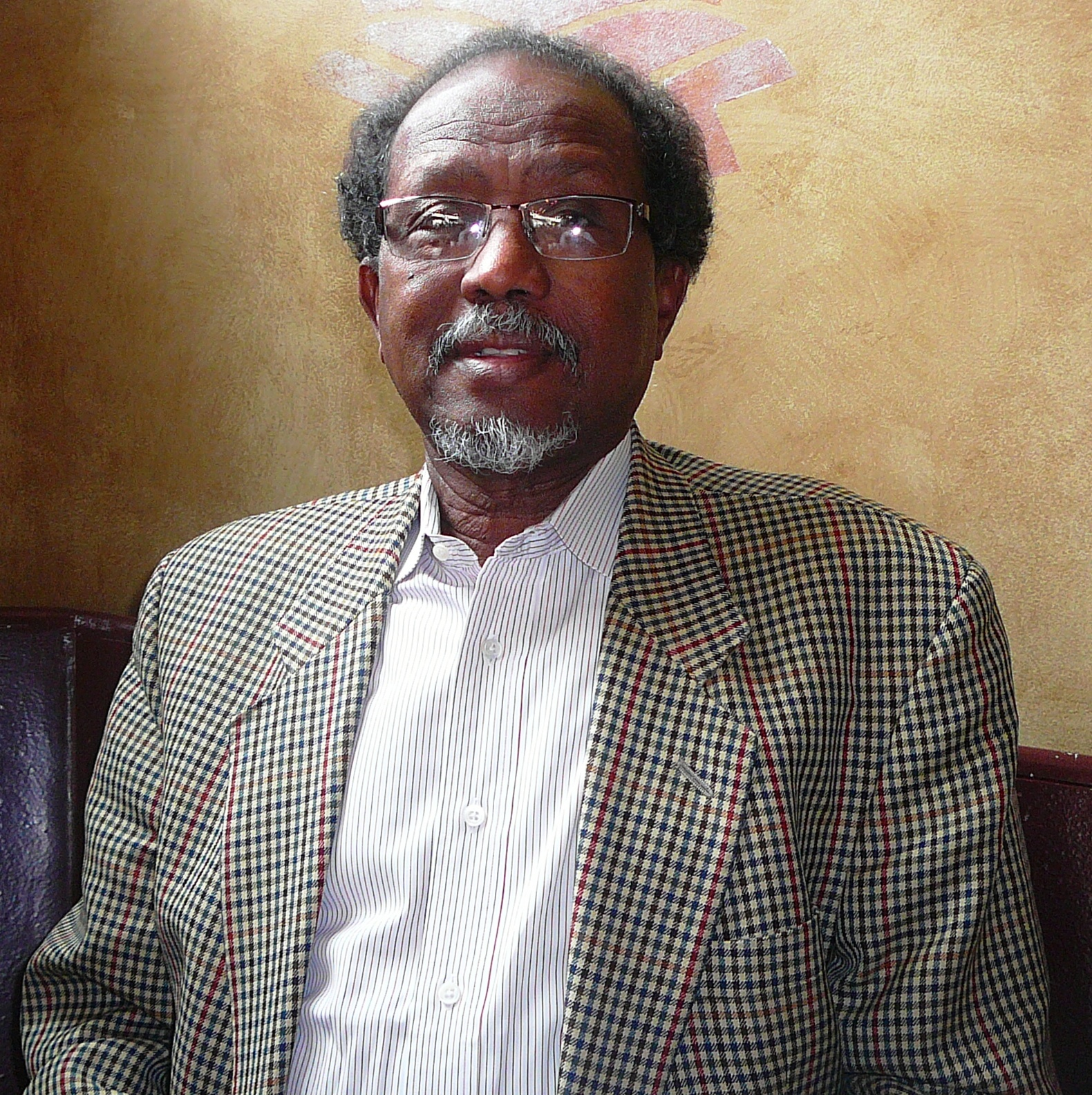

President of Khatumo State
- In office 1 September 2014 – 20 October 2017
- Preceded by: Mohamed Yusuf Jama
- Succeeded by: Position disestablished

Member of the Federal Parliament of Somalia
- In office 4 November 2012 – 8 October 2020

8th Prime Minister of Somalia
- In office 8 October 2000 – 28 October 2001
- President: Abdiqassim Salad Hassan
- Preceded by: Umar Arteh Ghalib
- Succeeded by: Osman Jama Ali

Personal details
- Born: 15 October 1941 Las Anod, British Somaliland
- Died: 8 October 2020 (aged 78) Jijiga, Ethiopia
- Party: Independent
- Education: SOS Sheikh Secondary School; Boston University; Syracuse University; Harvard University

Ali Khalif Galaydh (Somali: Cali Khalif Galaydh, Arabic: علي خليف غلير) (15 October 1941 – 8 October 2020) was a Somali politician. He was the first Prime Minister of the transitional Somalia administration from 8 October 2000 to 28 October 2001. Galaydh had extensive experience in public policy, diplomacy, public administration, and business. He taught these subjects at public universities in the United States. Additionally, Galaydh was the president of the Khaatumo state. In 2017, he signed an agreement with the Somaliland government which stipulated the amendment of Somaliland's constitution, this would’ve promoted peace and stability throughout the regions of Sool, sanaag and cayn.

== Personal life ==
Galaydh was born on 15 October 1941 in Las Anod, British Somaliland and hails from the royal Baharsame sub-subsection of the Dhulbahante clan, a sub-clan of the Harti Daarood clan. He attended Sheikh Intermediate School and SOS Sheikh Secondary School in Sheikh, situated in the Sahil region of present-day Somaliland. From 1963 to 1965, Galaydh received a scholarship to attend Boston University in Boston, Massachusetts. He graduated with honors in 1965, with a Bachelor of Arts in Political Science.

From 1967 to 1969, Galaydh attended the Maxwell School of Citizenship and Public Affairs at Syracuse University. He received a Master of Public Administration (M.P.A.) and finished all the requirements for a Ph.D. Galaydh later wrote and defended his dissertation in 1971 and 1972. Between 1982 and 1987, he was a fellow at the Weatherhead Center for International Affairs and a fellow for Middle Eastern Studies at Harvard University.

Galaydh died on 8 October 2020 in Jijiga, Ethiopia.

== Career ==
=== Executive leadership ===
From 1966 to 1973 Galaydh worked for the Somali Institute of Public Administration (SIPA) and the Somali Institute of Development Administration and Management (SIDAM). Galaydh started as a Research and Training Officer for one year before going to the Maxwell School of Citizenship and Public Affairs at Syracuse University for post-graduate work. He returned to SIPA in 1969 to eventually become the Director General.

In July, 1974 Galaydh was named general manager of Jowhar Sugar Enterprises, the biggest national sugar producer in Somalia. Galaydh managed 7,000 employees and 9,000 hectares of land for Jowhar Sugar Enterprises which contributed at least 10% to Somalia's national budget. From 1977 to 1980 Galaydh became the executive chairman of the $400 million Juba Sugar Project in Marery, Somalia. Galaydh worked closely with British companies to complete the project ahead of schedule and under budget.

Galaydh founded and operated the private Somali telecommunications company, Somtel.

=== Public administration ===
In 1979 Galaydh was appointed as a Member of Parliament. In 1980 Galaydh was appointed as the Minister of Industry by Siad Barre. He served in this role until 1982. When tensions were heightened by Siad Barre, Galaydh was part of a group of reformer ministers who fled the country to avoid being arrested by the Somali President.

=== Prime minister of Somalia ===
Starting in September 1999, Galaydh participated in the Somalia National Peace Conference (SNPC) in Arta, Djibouti. In October 2000, Abdiqasim Salad Hassan was named the new president of the Transitional National Government in Somalia and named Ali Khalif Galaydh as Prime Minister per 8 October. The two statesmen returned to Somalia from their Djibouti exile on October 14. On October 15, Ismail Mahmud Hurre was named Foreign Minister. The rest of the cabinet was announced five days later: Abdullahi Baqor Musa as Defense Minister, Dahir Shaykh Muhammad as Interior Minister, and Sayid Shaykh Dahir as Finance Minister, with Saida Haji Bashir Ismail as Finance Vice-Minister.

During his tenure, Galaydh led negotiations to get two of the five Somali warlords at the time to join the cabinet. The other three went to Ethiopia and joined together to form an armed, anti-government movement.

In February, 2001 Galaydh successfully used diplomatic methods to get Ethiopian troops to leave the Southwestern Somali region of Gedo which Ethiopia had occupied from August 1996 to February 2001.

He served until 28 October 2001.

=== Federal Parliament of Somalia ===
On 20 August 2012, Galaydh was among the legislators nominated to the newly created Federal Parliament of Somalia.

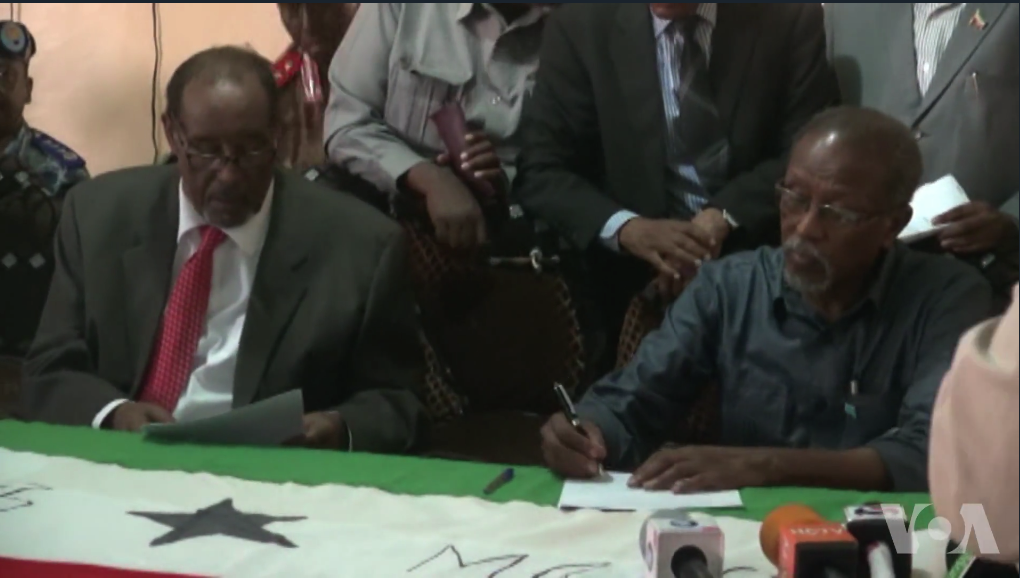
President Silanyo and Ali Khalif signing Somaliland-Khatumo Agreement in Aynabo in October 2017

=== President of Khatumo State ===
In September 2014, Galaydh was elected president of then newly created Khatumo state, a federal state member of Somalia in present day Somaliland. He defeated former co-president Mohamed Yusuf Jama (Indho Sheel) by 21 votes to 9. Assembly members, who had been appointed by traditional leaders, also selected Abdul Agalule as vice president.

Galaydh led peace talks with the central Somaliland government and reached an agreement at the town of Aynabo in October 2017 with Khatumo joining Somaliland.

== Death ==
Ali Khalif Galaydh died on 8 October 2020 from COVID-19. It was reported that Galaydh recently arrived in Jijiga and fell ill. On 10 October, Galaydh was buried in Mogadishu. President of Somalia Mohamed Abdullahi Mohamed expressed his deep condolences on his sudden death.
