= Abdiaziz Hussein Hassan =

Somali politician

Abdiaziz Hussein Hassan عبدالعزيز حسين حسن
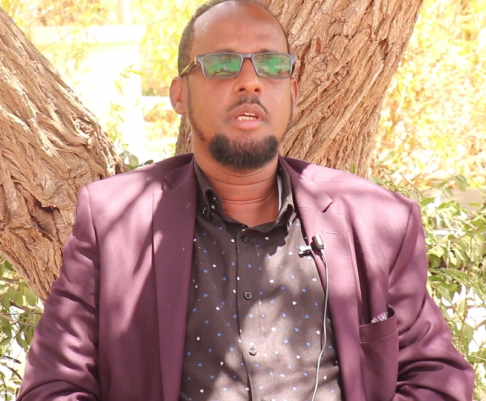

Mayor of Las Anod
- In office 16 January 2017 – 20 June 2021
- Preceded by: Osman Suleiman Jama
- Succeeded by: Abdirahim Ali Ismail

Personal details
- Party: Kulmiye Peace, Unity, and Development Party

Abdiaziz Hussein Hassan (Somali: Cabdicasiis Xuseen Xasan) also known as Taarwale is a Somali politician. He served as the Mayor of Las Anod, the capital and the largest city of Sool region of Somaliland, from 16 January 2017 to 20 June 2021, where he was succeeded by Abdirahim Ali Ismail.

== See also ==
- Mayor of Las Anod
- Las Anod

Political offices
Preceded by Osman Suleiman Jama	Mayor of Las Anod; 2017-2021	Succeeded by Abdirahim Ali Ismail
