= Jama Haji Mohamoud Egal =

Somali politician

Jama Mohamoud Egal
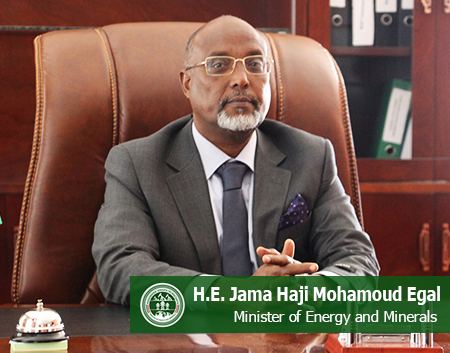

Minister of Energy and Minerals
- Incumbent
- Assumed office 14 December 2017
- President: Muse Bihi Abdi
- Preceded by: Hussein Abdi Dualeh

Personal details
- Party: Peace, Unity, and Development Party

Jama Mohamoud Egal (Somali: Jaamac Maxamuud Cigaal) is a Somali politician, who is currently serving as the Minister of Energy and Minerals of Somaliland. He hails from Sanbuur sub-clan of the Habr Je'lo Isaaq

== See also ==
- Ministry of Energy & Minerals (Somaliland)
- Politics of Somaliland
- List of Somaliland politicians

Political offices
Preceded by Hussein Abdi Dualeh	Minister of Energy & Minerals; 2017–present	Incumbent
