= Mayor of Las Anod =

Head of the government of Las Anod

- Incumbent; Abdirahim Ali Ismail since 20 June 2021
- Style: Mr Mayor (formally)
- Member of: Las Anod Municipal Council
- Seat: Las Anod City Hall
- Appointer: Las Anod Municipal Council
- Deputy: Ahmed Mohamed Omar

The Mayor of Las Anod is the chief executive of the city of Las Anod, the capital of Sool region. The position has historically operated under the Somaliland local government framework, but since early 2023 Las Anod has come under the administration of SSC-Khatumo following conflict between Somaliland forces and local militias. The current mayor is Abdirahim Ali Ismail, who was first elected on 20 June 2021, and who has continued to be identified in reporting as mayor during and after the 2023 conflict.

== List of mayors ==
Portrait	Name	Somali name	Term of office		
Portrait	Name	Somali name	Took office	Left office	Time in office
	Ahmed Aw Dahir	Axmed Daahir Xaaji Xasan		17 July 2011	
	Keyse Mohamed Hajji Hussein			19 July 2012	
	Abdilkadir Farah Jama		20 December 2012	3 April 2015	2 years, 104 days
	Osman Saleban Jama (Osman Suleiman Jama)	Cismaan Saleebaan Jaamac	3 April 2015	16 January 2017	1 year, 288 days
	Abdiaziz Hussein Hassan	Cabdicasiis Xuseen Xasan	16 January 2017	20 June 2021	4 years, 155 days
	Abdirahim Ali Ismail	Cabdiraxiin Cali Ismaaciil	20 June 2021	Incumbent	5 years, 79 days

== See also ==
- Mayor of Berbera
- Mayor of Burao
- Mayor of Borama
- Mayor of Hargeisa
- Mayor of Erigavo
