= Abaarso School of Science and Technology =

Coordinates: 9.6150°N 43.8742°E

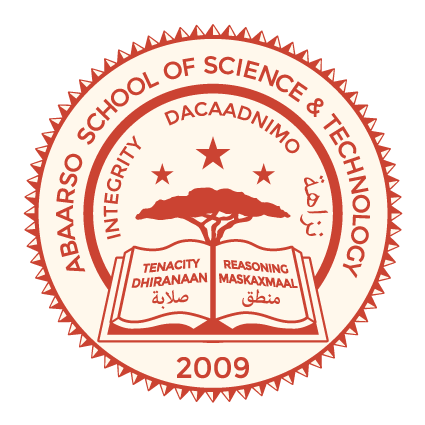

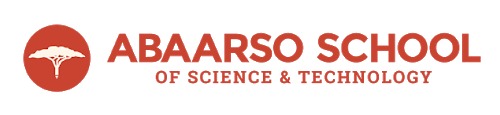

Location
- Abaarso Village; Hargeisa; Somaliland

Information
- Type: Independent, Boarding
- Established: 2009
- Founder: Jonathan Starr
- Chairman: Ahmed Jambir
- Heads of school: Tomoki Sasaki, Ahmed Qalib
- Grades: 7–12
- Enrollment: 272
- Colors: Red and off-white
- Athletics: +10 sports
- Website: abaarsoschool.org

Abaarso School of Science and Technology (Abaarso School) is a non-profit, co-educational boarding school in Abaarso, located in Maroodi Jeex, Somaliland. Its campus lies 18 km (11 mi) west of the provincial capital of Hargeisa. Abaarso was only a secondary school until 2013, when it first began to run an intermediate school as well. The school now ranges from grades 7–12, with a post-graduate option. There are approximately 120 students in the upper school and 98 in the lower school.

In 2014, Abaarso School was awarded Candidacy for Accreditation status from the New England Association of Schools and Colleges (NEASC).

== History ==
Abaarso School was founded in 2009 by Jonathan Starr, an American former finance executive. After donating half a million dollars of his own money, he gathered an international teaching staff. Within six years, the school has sent over 60 of its students to elite prep schools and colleges, including Amherst, Georgetown, MIT and Harvard.

== Academics ==
Admissions are test-based and have become increasingly more selective with each passing year. In the 2015–2016 school year, Abaarso had a competitive 9% acceptance rate for the seventh grade. The school enrolls students from across the country, and occasionally the Somali diaspora.

Abaarso provides six years of practical and culturally relevant education, taught entirely in English, with the exception of the Islamic Studies/Arabic courses and the Somali courses, to meet Somaliland's educational standards. Students at Abaarso School undergo a rigorous 30-hours-per-week schedule mainly focused on mathematics, English, and logical thinking. The curriculum is based on the American system, and is tailored to bring the students up to speed with their most competitive peers around the world, in addition to holding to students to extremely high standards of academics and behavior.

== Campus ==
The campus includes a school building, 39 staff boarding units, separate boys' and girls' dormitories, mosque, cafeteria, computer and chemistry laboratories, training center, a large library containing 30,000 books, football field, basketball, volleyball and tennis courts, girls' sports compound with a basketball court and soccer field, and multiple guard towers.

In 2014, Abaarso was awarded a grant from American Schools and Hospitals Abroad (ASHA) that has given the school the opportunity to build new facilities, including classrooms, computer and tablet labs, dorms, and staff housing.

In 2015, ASHA granted Abaarso $879,225 to further expand and update facilities.

== Student life ==
Students are assigned work-times, with the aim of creating a sense of responsibility in maintaining the school environment. These assignments are student-led, such as Operation Green, a group tasked with cultivating and managing the school gardens.

Additionally, there is a Student Council, a collection of students spanning multiple grade-levels that seeks to promote student interests on campus.

== Extracurricular activities ==
Abaarso provides an assortment of extracurricular activities for student participation. Clubs are led by teachers. These comprise computer programming, chess, science, health, public speaking, debate, creative writing, improv and drama. The drama club produces one play per academic term.

=== Athletics ===
A variety of athletic activities are offered at Abaarso. These activities include basketball, football, running, and fitness training.

== Community service ==
Abaarso School offers a number of community services for the students perform. These programs include tutoring at the Hargeisa Orphanage and an afternoon primary school program.

=== Orphanage tutoring ===
Four days a week, tutors from Abaarso go to the Hargeisa Orphanage Center to teach orphans (ranging from 5-year-olds to 19-year-olds) a series of math, English, and logic classes designed to augment the courses offered by the local schools. Since the program's start, Abaarso School has given full scholarships to nine students directly from the Hargeisa Orphanage.

=== Primary tutoring ===
In the afternoon, for five days a week, Abaarso accommodates a primary tutoring program. Abaarso students tutor local children in math and English. Since 2013, Abaarso has awarded five students from the village with scholarships.

== Notable alumni ==
- Ubah Ali - anti-FGM activist

== See also ==
- List of schools in Somaliland
- Education in Somaliland
- List of schools in Somaliland
