= Ubah Ali =

FGM campaigner from Somaliland

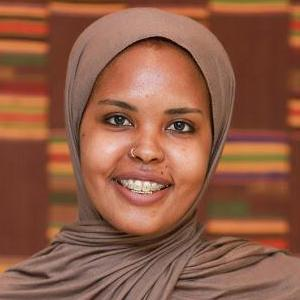
- Born: 1996 (age 29–30); Burao, Somaliland
- Education: University of Stirling American University of Beirut
- Occupation: Somali activist
- Spouse: Abdirahman Fiili
- Awards: BBC's 100 Women List

Ubah Ali (born 1996) is a social activist and feminist from Somaliland, who campaigns against female genital mutilation. In 2020, she was listed by the BBC as one of the world's most influential 100 Women.

== Biography ==
Ali was born in 1996 in Burco in the Toghdeer region of Somaliland. Her parents are both primary school dropouts: her father worked as a cab driver until he had a stroke in 2012, and her mother used to sell clothes. It was her mother who encouraged Ali's education and for her to apply for scholarships. She studied at the Abaarso School of Science and Technology from 2011 and left there in 2015. She then moved to Miss Hall's School and graduated from there in 2016. As of 2019, she was studying for a BA degree in Politics and Human Rights at the American University of Beirut. Her undergraduate study is funded by the Mastercard Foundation Scholars Program. Whilst studying there, she also tutors Syrian refugees.

Ubah Ali married Abdirahman Fiili 2025

== Activism ==
In 2015, aged 18, Ali established an organization called Rajo: Hope for Somaliland Community with the aim of providing educational opportunities for orphans and under-privileged students from Somaliland. This was inspired by work she undertook at the Hargeisa Orphanage Centre, between 2012 and 2015, where she tutored students. In 2015 she also fundraised for communities in Somaliland affected by drought.

In 2020, Ali became more widely known due to her campaigning against female genital mutilation (FGM) in Somaliland. In 2018 she founded the Solace for Somaliland Girls Foundation, which aims to end the practice through education and awareness campaigns. The group established the first anti-FGM group in Somaliland as a result. Whilst many Somali people associate FGM with Sharia, Ali alongside doctors and a growing number of religious leaders believe it to be a cultural phenomenon, which can be altered. Ali, as well as her three sisters, are survivors of FGM.

In 2020, Ubah Ali was part of the BBC's list of the 100 most influential women.

== Awards ==
- 2018–2019 Resolution Project Winner.
- 2019 Volunteer of the Year, American University of Beirut.
- 2020 BBC 100 Women List.
