= Abdirahim Ali Ismail =

Somali politician

Abdirahim Ali Ismail Farah
- Somali: Cabdiraxiin Cali Ismaaciil Faarax
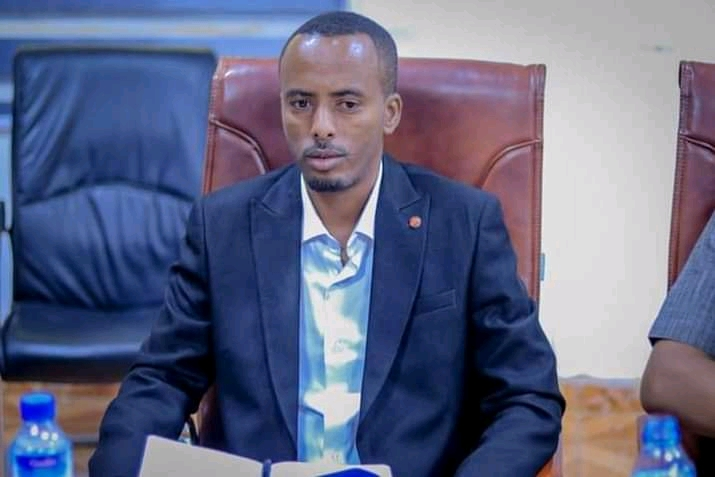

Mayor of Las Anod
- Incumbent
- Assumed office 20 June 2021
- Preceded by: Abdiaziz Hussein Hassan

Abdirahim Ali Ismail Farah (Somali: Cabdiraxiin Cali Ismaaciil Faarax), also known as Qase, is a Somali politician who has served as the Mayor of Las Anod, the capital of the Sool region, since 20 June 2021, following the 2021 Somaliland municipal elections.

== Background ==
Abdirahim belongs to the Dhulbahante clan, a major sub-clan of the Darod clan family, which predominates in the Sool region.

== Career ==
In the 2021 Somaliland municipal elections, Abdirahim was elected to the Las Anod municipal council on the Waddani ticket and, at the council’s first sitting on 20 June 2021, was chosen by councillors as mayor, succeeding Abdiaziz Hussein Hassan. Local media noted that the outcome in Las Anod was the product of a joint strategy by the opposition Waddani and UCID. The success of this opposition alliance in securing both the mayoralty and the deputy mayoralty was viewed as a political setback for the ruling Kulmiye party and for President Muse Bihi Abdi, since Las Anod is a strategically important city in the Sool region and its local leadership carried symbolic weight for Somaliland’s authority.

Following his appointment, he introduced several municipal security and administrative measures in late 2021, including the establishment of neighbourhood security committees, a re-division of the city into districts for public-order purposes, and a city-wide registration of houses and residents.

== 2023 Las Anod conflict and SSC-Khatumo ==
In January 2023, amid protests and targeted killings, Abdirahim said Las Anod had calmed after overnight clashes and that municipal authorities and community elders were working to stabilise the city; he also confirmed that army units withdrew to reduce harm to civilians. As clashes intensified in February, he rejected the “terrorist” label for residents and urged a withdrawal of Somaliland forces; district authorities later reported more than 210 people killed and 680 injured and appealed for all armed forces to keep away from the city. On Eid al-Fitr (21 April 2023), he said that achieving peace in the Sool region lay with the President of Somaliland, calling for troops to leave the city, and on 23 April he urged a rapid end to hostilities. During the conflict, reporting continued to identify Abdirahim as mayor while Las Anod aligned with the SSC-Khatumo administration; August 2023 coverage confirmed he remained in office. In June 2025, while serving as mayor, he called for justice after two sisters were raped in the city, urging calm and stating that authorities were investigating the case.

== See also ==
- Mayor of Las Anod
- Las Anod

| Preceded by Abdiaziz Hussein Hassan | Mayor of Las Anod; 2021–present | Incumbent |
