= Ilays National University =

University in Las Anod, Somali

Coordinates: 8.4760°N 47.3658°E

- Motto: Hoyga Aqoonta iyo Horumarka Bulshada
- Type: Private university
- Established: 2012
- Chairman: Prof. Abdisalam Tungub
- Location: Las Anod, Sool, Somalia
- Website: Official website

Ilays National University (INU), is a university in Las Anod, Somalia. The university was established by Prof. Absisalam Tungub, who at first set up the Ilays Educational Academy. INU was officially formed in 2012 with the purpose of providing higher education to the graduates of the academy and the residents of Sool, Sanaag and Ayn regions. The university is taught by teachers from outside the country, along with native Somali lecturers.
