= Ministry of Energy and Minerals (Somaliland) =

Government ministry of Somaliland

Ministry of Energy & Minerals Republic of Somaliland
- Wasaaradda Tamarta & Macdanta JSL

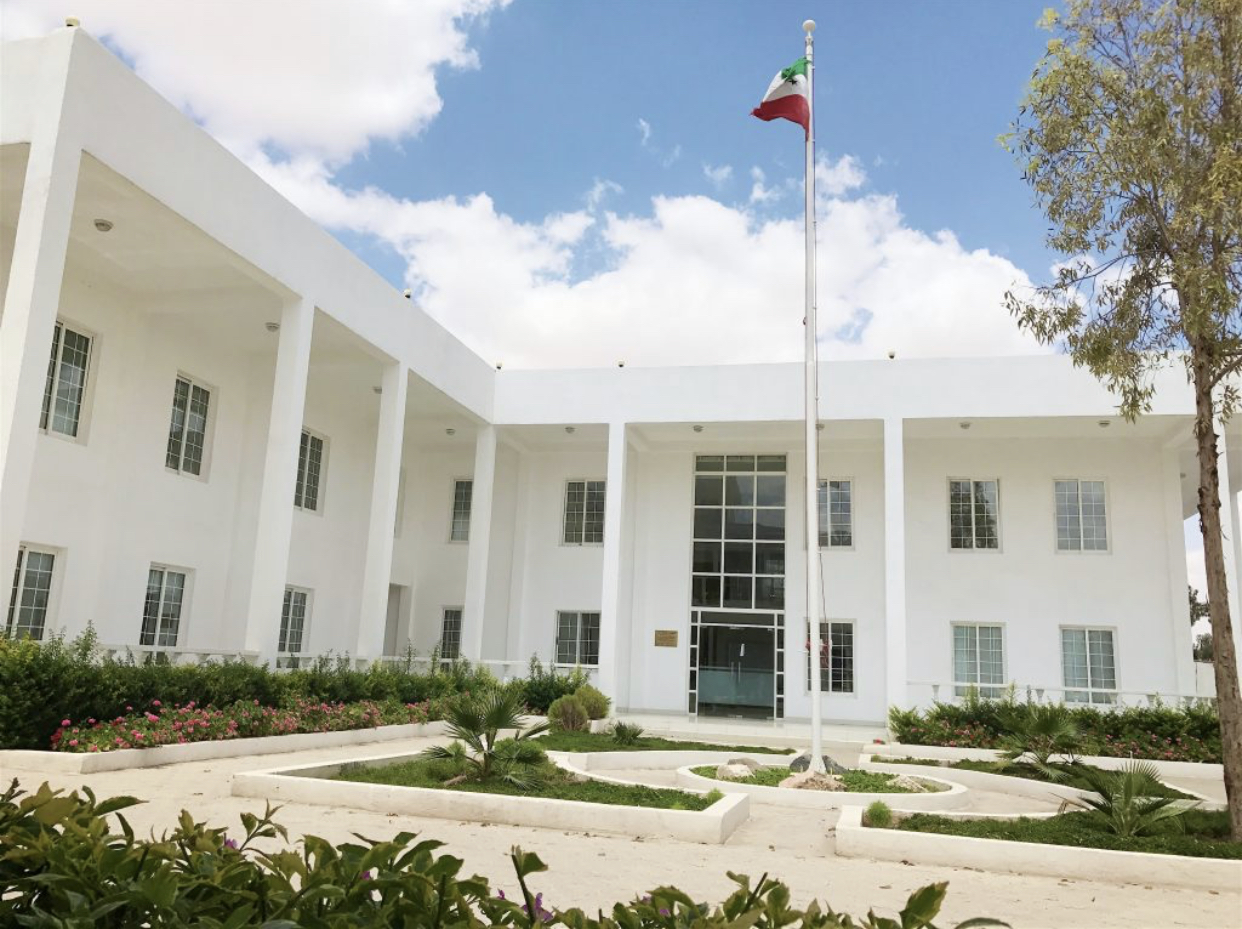
- Ministry building

Agency overview
- Jurisdiction: Government of Somaliland
- Headquarters: Hargeisa, Maroodi Jeh
- Website: moem.govsomaliland.org

The Ministry of Energy and Minerals (MoEM, Somali: Wasaaradda Tamarta iyo Macdanta Soomaaliland, Arabic: وزارة الطاقة والمعادن) is one of the governmental bodies of Somaliland. The ministry has the function of developing and implementing policies related to electricity, minerals, petroleum and petroleum products.

== Jurisdiction and Responsibility ==
The ministry was established as the Ministry of Mining and Water Resources upon Somaliland's restoration of independence in 1991.

In March 2010, the Cabinet approved the Somaliland Energy Policy. It aimed to develop Somaliland's energy resources including wind, solar, fossil fuels, and other renewables, and to establish supply networks. The ministry was tasked with developing the regulatory framework for the energy sector. In July 2010, the minister of the department was appointed as the Minister of Mining, Energy and Water.

In December 2015, the Ministry of Mining, Energy and Water was split to the Ministry of Water Resources and the Ministry of Energy and Minerals.

== Scope of activities ==
=== Energy sector operations ===
Department for International Development (DFID) Somaliland has initiated a five-year programme (2014-2019) to improve access to electricity with the introduction of Mini hybrid grids in Somaliland. The programme will be implemented in two phases.

ADRA Somaliland launched a new three-year project (2015-2017) to contribute to poverty alleviation, fragility reduction, and climate change mitigation for rural and peri-urban people in Somaliland.

== Somaliland oil blocks ==
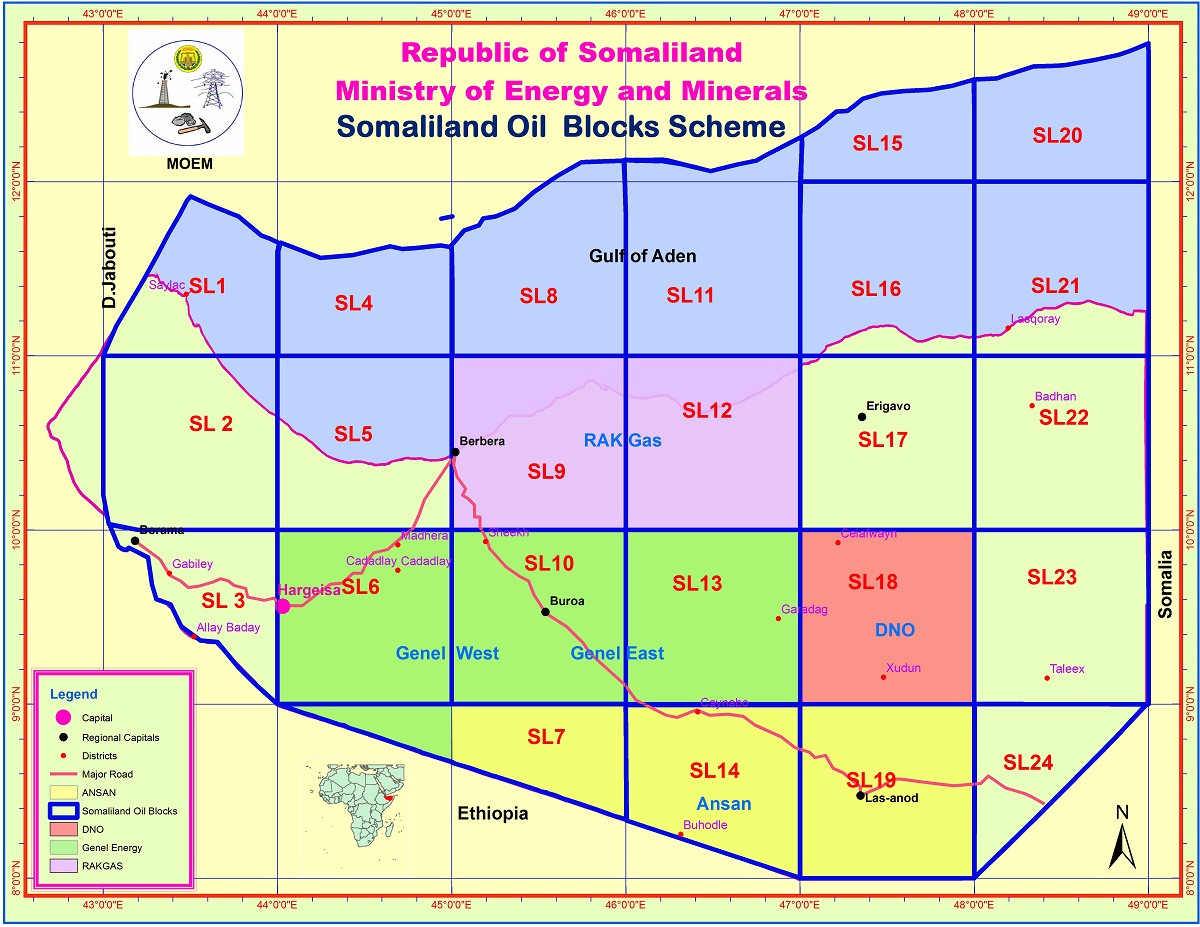
Somaliland oil blocks

=== Genel Energy ===
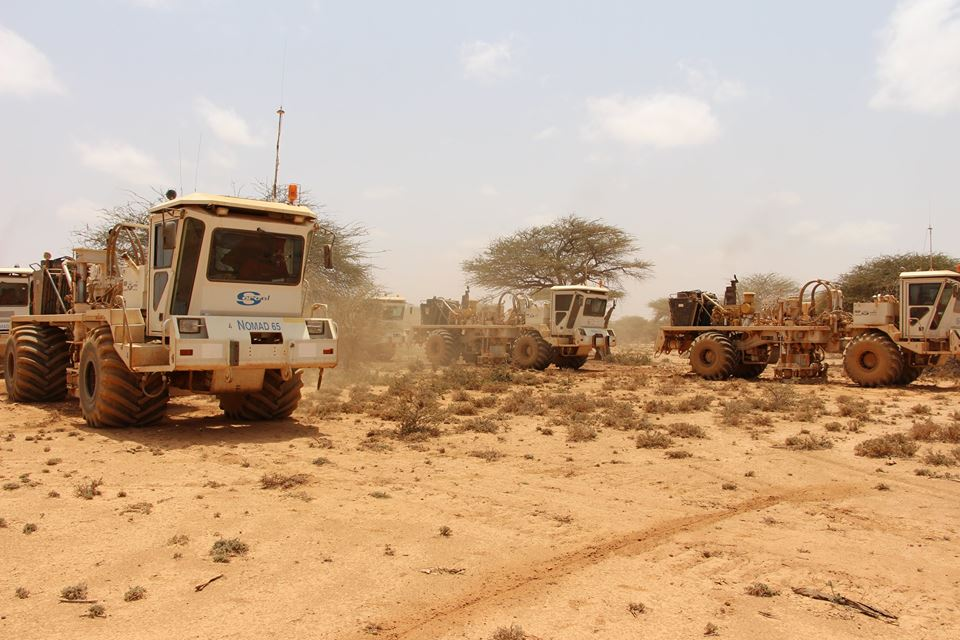
Oil and gas exploration activities in Odwayne, Togdheer region

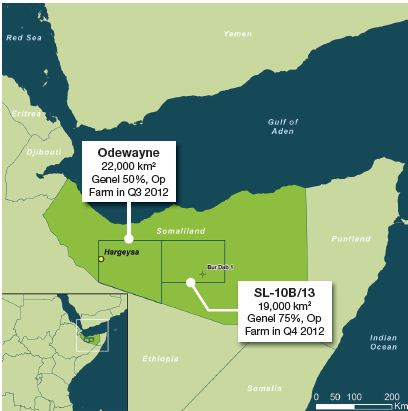
somaliland oil

In August 2012, Genel Energy was awarded an exploration licence for onshore blocks SL-10-B and SL-13 in Somaliland, with a 75% working interest in both. Genel extended its presence in November 2012 with the acquisition of 50% participating interest in the Odwayne Production Sharing Agreement which covers blocks SL-6, SL-7, SL-10A. CPC Taiwan joined in exploration, in key Qishn region SL10/SL13, with 3 way and 4 way oil traps found on genel oil data.

Onshore Somaliland is a relatively unexplored region around 19 wells drilled, with few exploration wells drilled with ExxonMobil, Chevron and Conoco. The total size of the blocks is approximately equivalent to the entire Kurdistan Region of Iraq. Bahadhamal oil discovery in Somaliland in 2022 showed 2 barrels of light crude oil from water boar hole around 500-1000m below surface showing visible flow of crude oil in Somaliland.

Genel took the opportunity because of encouraging indications including onshore oil seeps and existing geological data showing favorable conditions for hydrocarbons to have accumulated in numerous large tilted fault blocks and sub-basins. In addition, the basins of Somaliland were contiguous to Yemen prior to the opening of the Gulf of Aden in the Oligocene-Miocene - similar sedimentary sequences and structural styles are expected in Somaliland.

The ministry are targeting resources of over 4 billion barrels (640 million cubic metres) in blocks SL-10B and SL-13. The Odewayne block has a similar resource potential to this, targeting in order of 1 billion bbl (160 million m^{3}).

Gravity and aeromag has been acquired and interpreted over the entire 40,000 square km acreage.

=== CPC Taiwan ===
CPC Corporation, Taiwan (through its subsidiary OPIC Somaliland Corporation) holds a 49% non-operated interest in the SL10B/13 blocks after entering a farm-out agreement with operator Genel Energy at the end of 2021. The partnership is currently preparing for the drilling of the Toosan-1 well, which targets an estimated 650 million barrels (MMbbl) of mean prospective resources and is planned for a spud date in December 2025. Success at Toosan-1 is expected to unlock a multi-billion-barrel play fairway across the block, with identified routes to commercialization via oil exports through the port of Berbera using existing infrastructure.

=== DNO ASA ===
On 8 September 2014, DNO ASA, the Norwegian oil and gas operator, announced that it has been granted a two-year extension of the term of its production sharing agreement for Block SL18 in Somaliland. The first exploration period was set to end on 8 November 2017.

Block SL18, in which DNO has a 50 percent stake as operator, is a frontier exploration block. The partners completed a field survey and environmental assessment studies over the block and was scheduled to initiate a planned seismic acquisition program once the Government of Somaliland has put in place a planned Oil Protection Unit (OPU) to support the international oil companies operating in Somaliland. The OPU was expected to be operational in 2015.

In the interim, security conditions permitting, DNO will resume a development program focused on drilling water wells to provide local communities in the areas covered by Block SL18 with potable water.

== Ministers ==
Image	Minister	Ministry Name	Term start	Term end
	Mohamed Ali Ateye; Maxamed Cali Caateeye	Ministry of Mining and Water Resources; Wasaaradda Macdanta iyo Biyaha	1991	1997
	Mohamed Abdi Farah (Ina Abdi Malow); Maxamed Cabdi Faarax (Ina Cabdi Malow)	Ministry of Mining and Water Resources; Wasaaradda Macdanta iyo Biyaha		
	Abdirahman Dihood; Cabdiraxmaan Dixood	Ministry of Mining and Water Resources; Wasaaradda Macdanta iyo Biyaha		
	Qasim Sheikh Yusuf Ibrahim; Qaasim Shiikh Yuusuf Ibraahim	Ministry of Mining and Water Resources; Wasaaradda Macdanta iyo Biyaha	May 2003	November 2009
	Muse Abdi Ismael (Mushmed); Muuse Cabdi Ismaaciil (Mushmed)	Ministry of Mining and Water Resources; Wasaaradda Macdanta iyo Biyaha	January 2010	March 2010
	Farhan Jama Ismail; Farxaan Jaamac Ismaaciil	Ministry of Mining and Water Resources; Wasaaradda Macdanta iyo Biyaha	March 2010	July 2010
	Hussein Ali Duale; Xuseen Cabdi Ducaale	Ministry of Mining, Energy and Water; Wasaaradda Macdanta, Biyaha iyo Tamarta	July 2010	December 2017
	Jama Haji Mohamoud Egal; Jaamac Maxamuud Cigaal	Ministry of Energy and Minerals; Wasaaradda Macdanta iyo Tamarta	December 2017	September 2021
	Abdillahi Farah Abdi; Cabdillaahi Faarax Cabdi	Ministry of Energy and Minerals; Wasaaradda Macdanta iyo Tamarta	September 2021	December 2024
	Ahmed Jama Barre Rooble; Axmed Jaamac Barre Rooble	Ministry of Energy and Minerals; Wasaaradda Macdanta iyo Tamarta	December 2024	Present

== See also ==
- Politics of Somaliland
- Cabinet of Somaliland
