= Abaarso =

- Town
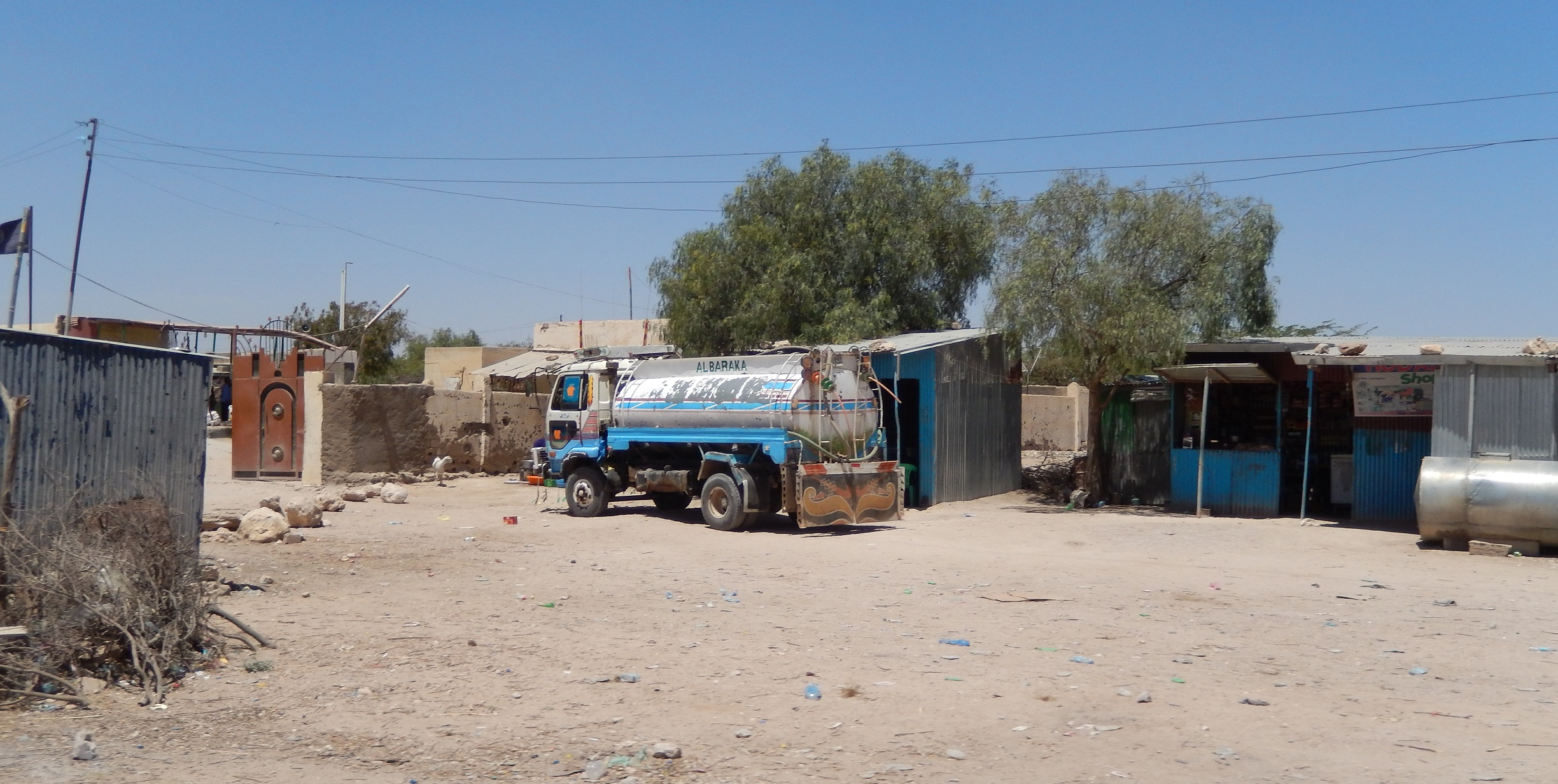
- Abaarso

- Location in Somaliland. Abaarso (Somaliland)
- Coordinates: 9°36′08″N 43°52′51″E
- Country: Somaliland
- Region: Maroodi Jeex
- Time zone: UTC+3 (EAT)

Abaarso is a small town in the northwestern Maroodi Jeex region of Somaliland. It is located 15 km west of Somaliland's capital Hargeisa, and is known for being the home to the Abaarso School of Science and Technology. The name 'Abaarso' comes from the Somali word meaning drought.

== See also ==
- Administrative divisions of Somaliland
- Regions of Somaliland
- Districts of Somaliland
