= Hass Petroleum =

HASS Petroleum Group
- Type: Private
- Industry: Energy
- Founded: 1997 in Kisumu, Kenya
- Headquarters: Nairobi, Kenya
- Products: Energy
- Website: HASS Petroleum

HASS or HASS Petroleum is a privately owned oil marketing company headquartered in Nairobi, Kenya.

== History ==
Hass Petroleum was founded in 1997 by two brothers, Abdirizak Ali Hassan and sitting Chairman Abdinasir Ali Hassan. The current CEO is Mohamud Salat, based in Nairobi. Abdinasir Ali Hassan currently lives in the UAE and London. The organization built its first gas station in Kisumu in 2002. In May 2017, the company began construction on the tallest building in Africa. In July 2017, it was announced that an Omani government-owned oil company had purchased a 40.3% stake in Hass Petroleum. In June 2018, Hass Petroleum opened a new service station along Juja Road.

== Awards ==
- 2017 business of the year (International Somali Awards)
