= Abdinasir Ali Hassan =

Somali Kenyan businessman

- Born: Garissa, Kenya
- Citizenship: Somali Kenyan
- Occupation: Businessman
- Known for: chairman of Hass Petroleum

Abdinasir Ali Hassan (Somali: Cabdinaasir Cali Xasan), is a Somali-Kenyan entrepreneur and the chairman of Hass Petroleum, an international oil marketing company.

== Hass Petroleum ==
Hassan took over the company after his brother, Abdirazak Ali Hassan died. He began expanding the company reach into new markets, in Africa such as Somalia and the South Sudan. Today, Hass Petroleum operates more than 11 countries in east Africa and maintains offices in London and Dubai.
