= Jonathan Starr =

American businessperson

- Born: Worcester, Massachusetts
- Education: Emory University
- Organization: Abaarso School of Science and Technology
- Notable work: It Takes a School
- Board member of: Horn of Africa Education Development Fund

Jonathan Starr is the founder of Flagg Street Capital. Prior to founding Flagg Street Capital, he worked as an analyst at SAB Capital and Blavin and Company, and as a Research Associate within the Taxable Bond Division at Fidelity Investments. Jonathan Starr closed Flagg Street Capital and in 2009 opened the Abaarso School of Science and Technology in Somaliland with his personal finances. His work in Somaliland has been written about in The New York Times, Wall Street Journal, Bloomberg BusinessWeek, CNN, and the Christian Science Monitor. Jonathan is a graduate of Worcester Academy.

== It Takes a School ==
It Takes a School: The Extraordinary Story of an American School in the World's #1 Failed State is Jonathan Starr's story of leaving the financial world to found the Abaarso School of Science and Technology. The book was published on February 7, 2017, by Henry Holt and Company.

== See also ==
- Somalia
