= Education in Somaliland =

Education system of Somaliland

Ministry of Education and Science (Somaliland)

National education budget (2019)
- Budget: 7.8% of GDP

General details
- Primary languages: Somali, Arabic and English

Literacy
- Total: 92.5%
- Male: 95.5%
- Female: 85.5%

Education in Somaliland is provided in public and private schools. Education in Somaliland is managed by Ministry of Education and Science which controls the development and administration of state schools; it also has an advisory and supervisory role in private schools.

== Ministry of Education and Science ==
The Ministry of Education and Science of Somaliland is a national body implementing the executive functions relating to the development of state policy and to legal regulation in the following spheres: basic education, secondary/vocational education, non-formal education, special needs education and higher education in both public and private institutions.

== Somaliland Education System ==
The Somaliland education system has four main levels: pre-primary, primary, secondary/vocational and higher education.

Pre-primary (early childhood), is the first stage and is for children aged 3 to 6 years. It includes both formal education and Quranic learning. Runs for up to two to three years. This stage usually lasts about three and supports developing skills and preparing for primary school. Primary schooling lasts for eight years and is divided into elementary (lower primary) and intermediate (upper primary) cycles, both lasting four years. At this level, students learn basic subjects. Secondary education and vocational training also run for four years. Secondary education organizes students for higher education, and vocational training offers practical skills for employment. The tertiary level for both systems runs for four years (University level).

Teaching methods in Somaliland

Teaching methods in Somaliland are affected by both traditional and modern education systems. Traditional education has been practiced for many years. It mainly uses teacher-centered strategies, where the teacher speaks and students listen, repeat, and memorize information..This method often focuses on memorization rather than understanding. As a result, students may have limited opportunities to strengthen critical thinking and problem solving skills. In recent years, there has been a shift toward modern teaching methods. Modern education focuses on student-centered learning, where students participate in group discussions, group work and practical activities. It also motivates the use of technology and purpose to develop skills such as critical thinking, communication and decision-making. However, the traditional method still exists and is challenging, as many schools continue to rely on older teaching practices.

Challenges in education in Somaliland

Education in Somaliland faces several challenges because of changes in society, the economy, and technology. Good education means having enough resources, good teaching, strong student results, and helping society. One big problem is not having enough resources, like trained teachers, learning materials, and school buildings. These problems affect how teachers teach and how students learn. Also, some schools still use old teaching methods, and these methods do not help students to be active or participate in class. Another challenge is the need to become adapted to a changing world. Globalization requires students to learn communication skills, understand other cultures, and respect diversity., while still maintaining their own cultural identity. Additionally, technology is changing education, however many schools do not have enough access to digital tools or training.

== See also ==
- Ministry of Education and Science (Somaliland)
- Ahmed Mohamed Diriye
- List of universities in Somaliland
- List of schools in Somaliland
- National Library of Somaliland
