= Berbera Marine College =

- Type: naval military academy
- Established: 2005
- Students: future naval officers for the Somaliland Navy
- Location: Berbera, Somaliland

Berbera Marine College is a naval military academy located in the port city of Berbera in Somaliland, a self-declared independent republic that is internationally recognized as an autonomous region of Somalia.

== Overview ==
The college was founded in 2005 as an educational and research institution focusing on the sustainable development and use of Somaliland's national marine resources.

It supplies naval officers for the Somaliland Navy. The school produces graduates who follow International Maritime Bureau standards and regulations, including those against piracy. The Berbera Marine College became fully functional in the last five years, with more than 100 officers graduating from the college each year. Somaliland's government established the college after the need for a navy to combat illegal fishing and human trafficking arose in the region.
