= Nugaal University =

University in Las Anod, Khatumo State of Somalia

- Jaamacadda Nugaal
- Motto: What you seek is what we provide
- Type: Public university
- Established: 2004
- President: Abdirizak M Adam "Lafoole"
- Vice-president: Abdinasir M Barre "أبو شيبة"
- Dean: Dr Mustafe Abdi Mohamed
- Location: Las Anod, Sool, Northeastern State, Somalia
- Website: Official website

Nugaal University is a university in Las Anod, Northeastern state, Somalia. It was established in 2004 with the purpose of providing higher education to the residents of Sool, Cayn and Sanaag. The university is taught by teachers from outside the country. The university is a member of the Association of Arab Universities and is funded by the Sool Community.
