= Las Anod =

Las Anod Laascaanood (Somali) لاسعانود (Arabic)
- City
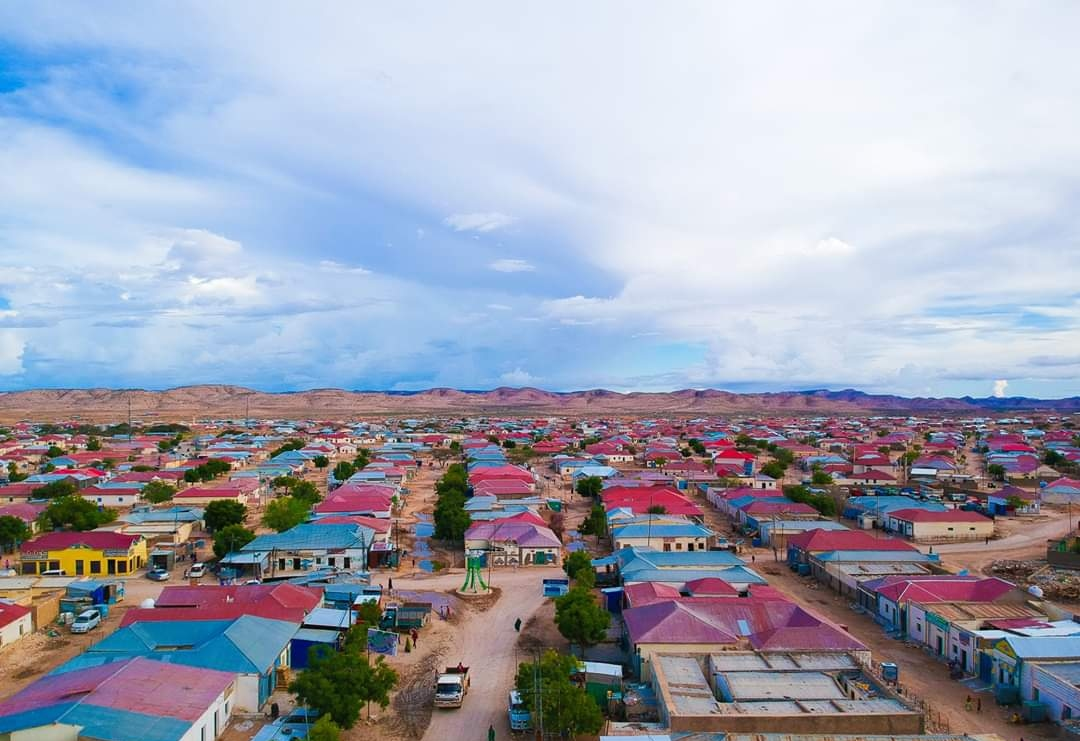
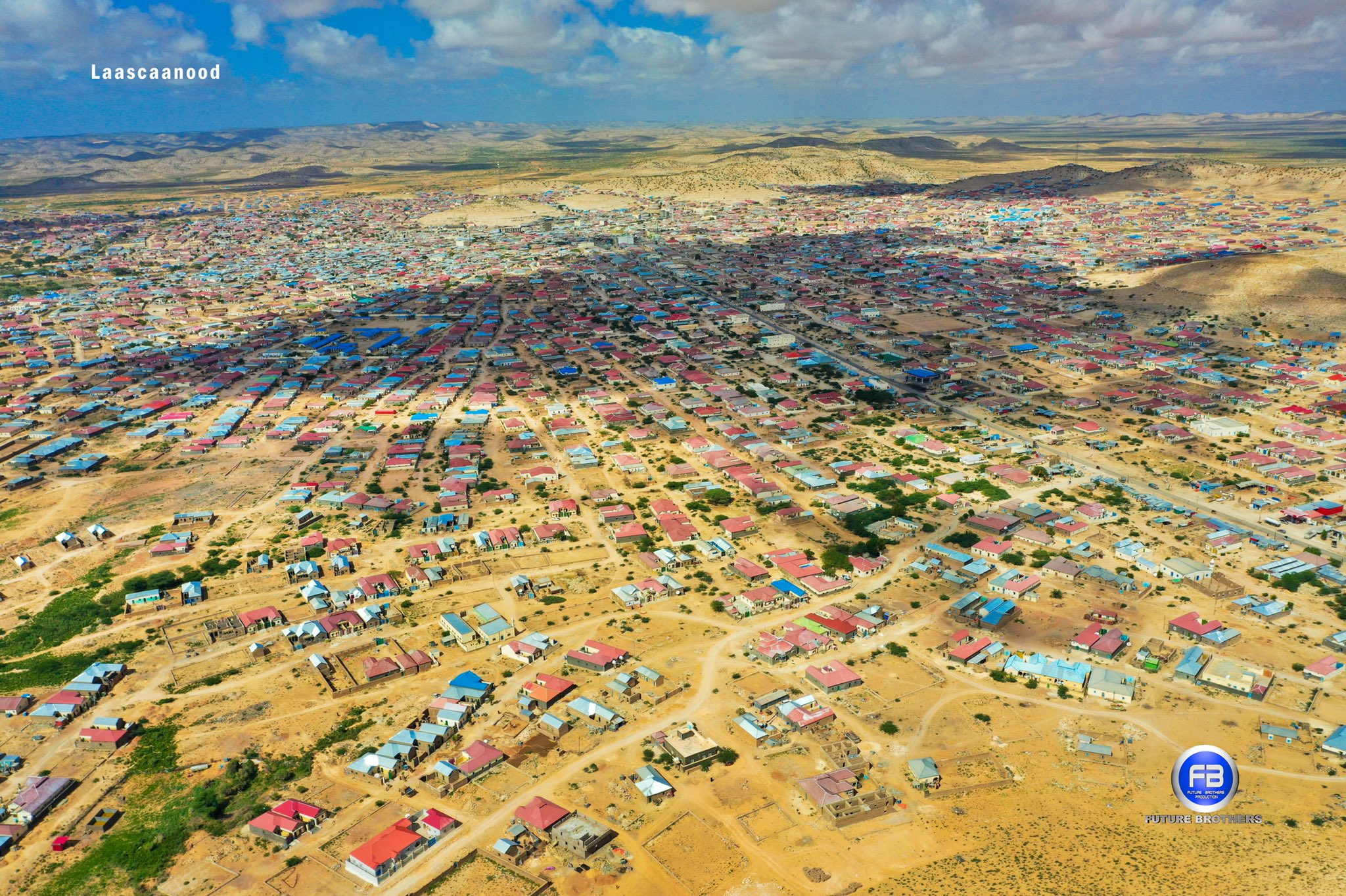
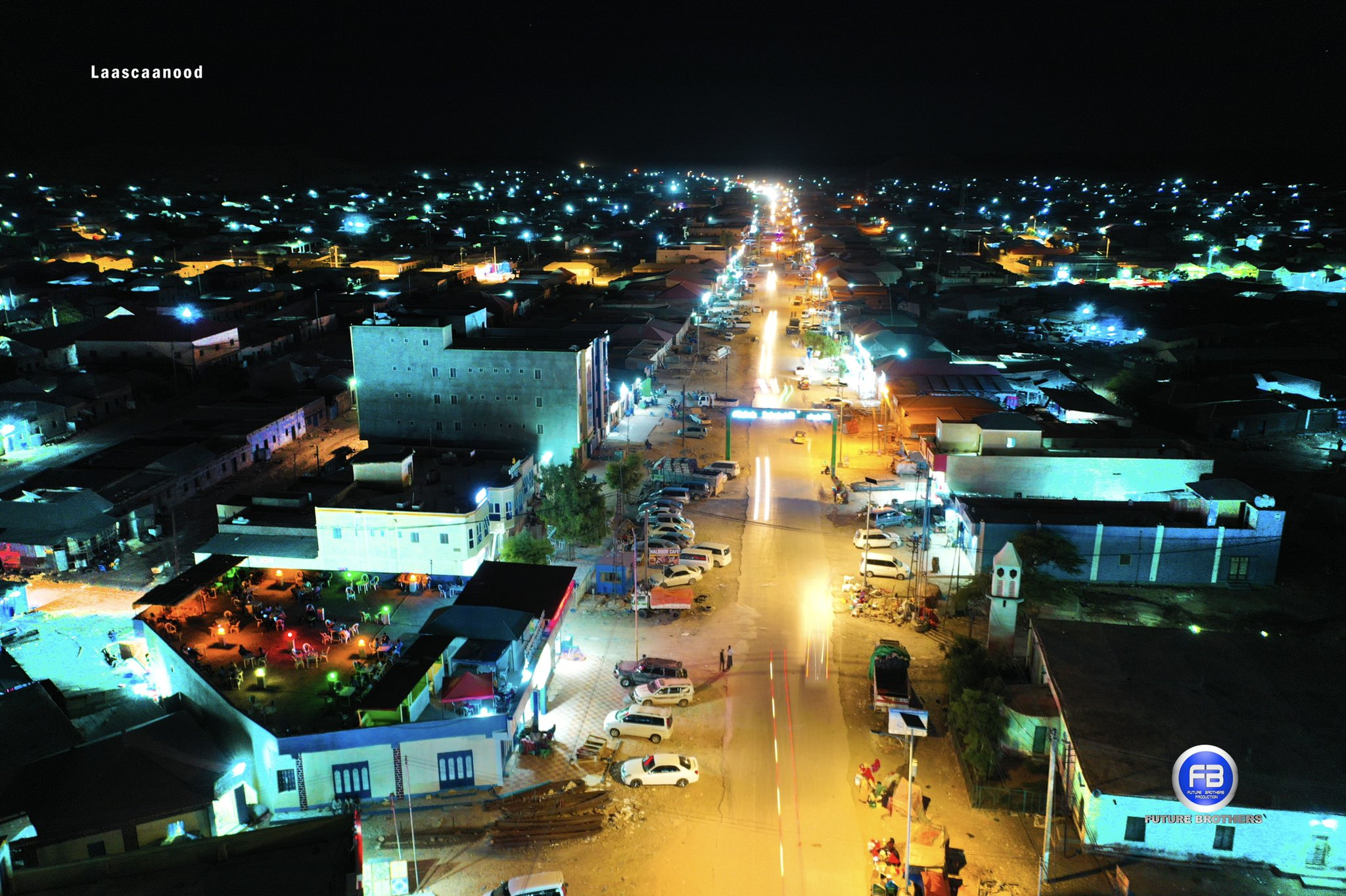
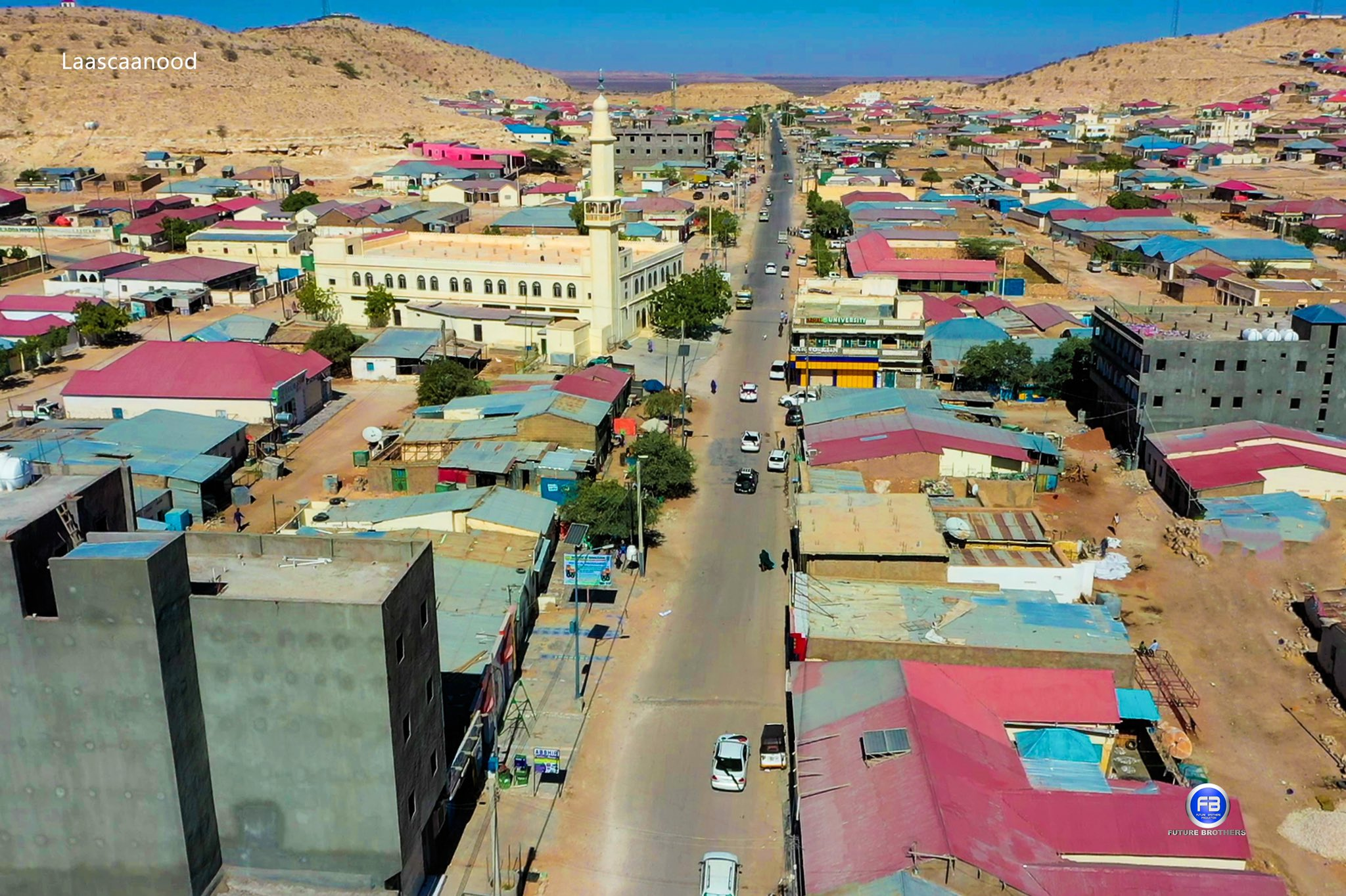

- Las Anod Local Government Logo
- Nicknames: Laaska, L.A.
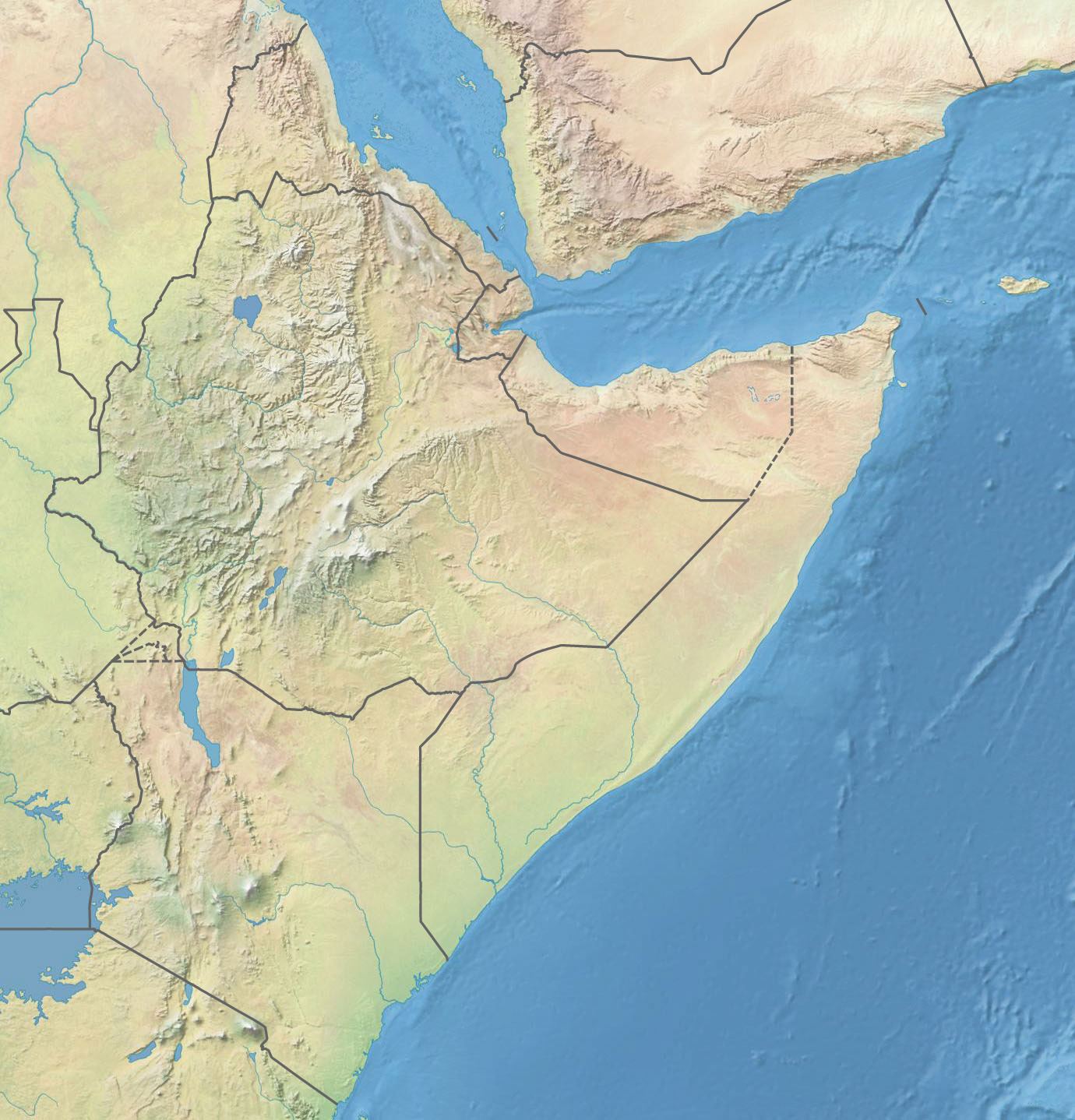
- Location within Somalia Location within the Horn of Africa Location within Africa Las Anod (Africa)
- Coordinates: 8.476°N 47.357°E
- Country: Somalia
- Regional State: North Eastern State of Somalia
- Region: Sool

Government
  - Type: District Council
  - Mayor: Abdirahim Ali Ismail
- Elevation: 691 m (2,267 ft)

Population (2014)
  - City: 156,438
  - Rank: 6th
  - Urban: 76,498
- Time zone: UTC+3 (EAT)

Las Anod (Somali: Laascaanood; Arabic: لاسعانود) is the administrative capital of the Sool region, currently controlled by North Eastern State of Somalia forces aligned with Somalia.

== Territorial dispute ==
The city is disputed by Puntland and Somaliland. The former bases its claim due to the kinship ties between the Dhulbahante clan and the dominant clan in Puntland, the Majeerteen, whilst the latter's claim is grounded on the border of the former British Somaliland Protectorate. The city was the proclaimed capital of Khatumo State throughout its existence until its dissolvement in 2017.

Somaliland forces captured the city in the Battle of Las Anod in 2007, ousting Puntland forces, and has maintained full control of the city in all aspects since. Until now Somaliland governs Las Anod with little legitimacy or popularity, while regular unknown assassinations have deteriorated the security situation.

Ahmed Musa reports, the residents of Las Anod have not fully accepted Somaliland's presence in their city:

Somaliland still governs Lasanod with little legitimacy or popularity. This is one reason why Somaliland has to be flexible with respect to tax collection. It cannot impose the full tax code on the Dhulbahante territories because that would only reinforce local people’s existing grievances vis-à-vis Somaliland. Therefore, Somaliland’s reduced taxes (cashuur dhaaf) in the Lasanod areas are one way of garnering, or at least retaining, some level of public acceptance.

=== 2023 conflict and changes in possession ===
Sparked by anti-government protests, war broke out again in February 2023 between Somaliland and Khatumo State forces. On August 25, 2023, Khatumo State forces achieved a decisive victory, successfully driving Somaliland forces out of Las Anod. As the Khatumo State is supported by the Somali government, Las Anod has effectively come under the control of Somalia.

== History ==
=== Pre-independence ===
On 31 July 1903, a battle occurred between 30 British scouts and 128 Dervish scouts, a few miles west of Heli Madu near Las Anod:

"half way between Las Anod and Heli Madu ... they were the advanced scouts of a party of 128 of the Mullah's scouts, mostly spearmen ... the enemy emerged from thick bush. They fought for two hours, the enemy losing many men killed and wounded, the exact number not being known; the enemy dragged their wounded and dead away.

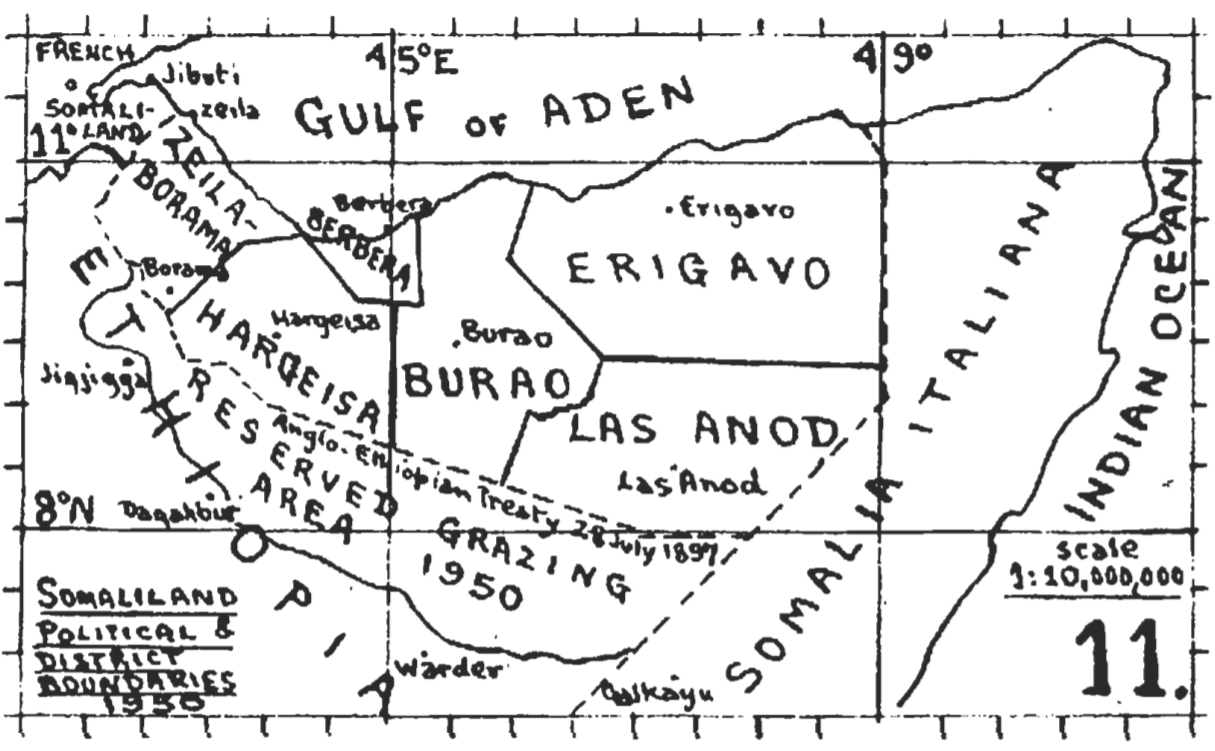
Las Anod-Nogal district from 1944 – 1960.

The motive for this Dervish development was said by Roman Loimeier as caused by how the Dhulbahante had not signed colonial protective treaties (since the Italians considered part of the Dhulbahante as subjects of the Italian-protected Sultan of the Majeerteen), combined with the fear, agitation and anxiety from contemporaneous yearly expedition-raids by marauding Menelik II armies and their pillaging.

During the British protectorate era, Las Anod was the capital of the Nogal District, the precursor province of Sool, described by John Hunt as an "entirely Dolbahanta" province.

=== Post-independence ===
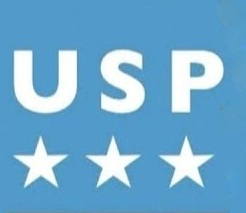
Garad Ali's USP party represented Warsangeli, Gadabuursi and Dhulbahante clans

The United Somali Party was founded in Las Anod with the intention of forming a non-Isaaq axis, due to tensions deriving from the instability in 1954 and 1955. The instability of 1954 was primarily due to camel-rustling between Dhulbahante and Habar Jeclo, whilst that of 1955 was due to roaming resulting from droughts that culminated into a war with Dhulbahante on one side battling the two Isaaq clans of Habr Yunis and Habar Jeclo on the other:

On the 27th of October the District Commissioner Las Anod, completed the hearing of an enquiry into previous unrest in the region... One of those killed was a man of the Habar Yuunis Sa'ad Yuunis who were fighting with the Habar Ja'lo against the Ḍulbahante, and the other a man of the MaḤammad Abokor.

From 1959 until 1961, Las Anod was the seat of Garad Ali's USP party. With Las Anod as its seat, Garad Ali's USP party formed a coalition consisting of the Warsangeli, Gadabuursi and Dhulbahante clans. In the previous six years, Ali's father Garad Farah, was in self-induced exile in Mogadishu:

Ali Gerad Jama, the university – educated son of the Gerad ( chief ) Jama Farah ( who went into voluntary exile in Mogadiscio from 1952 to 1958 as a result of his conflict with the British administration ) provided the main drive behind the party.

On October 15, 1969, whilst paying a visit to the city, Somali President Abdirashid Ali Shermarke was shot dead by one of his own bodyguards. His assassination was quickly followed by a military coup d'état on October 21, 1969 (the day after his funeral), in which the Somali Military seized power without encountering armed opposition — essentially a bloodless takeover. The putsch was spearheaded by Major General Mohamed Siad Barre, who at the time commanded the army.

Initially, there was cordiality between the SYL party (Somali Youth League) and the northern Harti-dominated USP party; for instance the parties held joint conferences across Somalia and together expressed support for Somalia's new constitution in 1960. However, post independence, Las Anod has had a history of suspicion of centralized politics, including against the unitary and Somali nationalist platform of the Somali Youth League (SYL). For example, in the 1960s, five SYL officials were killed within the city. Towards the end of the decade 16 people were once against killed when the SYL party supporters staged in the city.

Throughout the 21st century, Las Anod has been described as the only city in the Horn of Africa wherein the population's dignitaries are regularly assassinated without a culprit, suspect or defendant being named, including the extolled influencer Cabdirisaaq Cardoofe, assassinated in 2021.

=== Recent history ===
In December 2022, a Las Anod politician was assassinated leading to violent confrontations and the death of 20 protesters. The President of Somaliland announced that the cause of the incident must be identified. President Puntland accused Somaliland of carrying out attacks against civilians. The Somaliland government accused Puntland of spreading misinformation to incite violence in Las Anod.

In early January 2023 Somaliland's Minister of Interior Mohamed Kahin Ahmed sat down with traditional elders and intellectuals from Las Anod to discuss the current situation in the city, where protests against the frequent assassinations in Las Anod are taking place.

On January 31, the Somaliland government warned the country's media outlets against spreading news, reports, and polls that could worsen the situation in Las Anod that "everyone working in Somaliland is obligated to follow the laws of the country, first and foremost the Somaliland Constitution."

On February 6, the first asylum seekers arrived in Ethiopia.

On February 6, a committee composed of town leaders and traditional elders appointed to deliberate on the political future of the region attempted to publicly announce its intention to reject Somaliland and form a Federal Republic of Somalia under the name SSC-Khaatumo. However, Somaliland troops camped outside Las Anodos shelled the town and disrupted the announcement.

On February 8, Las Anod mayor Abdirahim Ali Ismail stated that "this is not a war between Somaliland and Puntland, nor between Somaliland and terrorists, but between the Somaliland army and the people of Las Anod."

On February 14, the Djiboutian government denied rumors of Djibouti's involvement in the fighting in Las Anod following unconfirmed reports on social media against Djibouti regarding the situation in Las Anod.

On February 16, the BBC announced that the Las Anod rebel group had formed a cultural council; the BBC listed the key figures as Garad Jama Garad Ali, Garaad Cabdullaahi Garaad Saleebaan Garaad Maxamed, Garad Jama Garad Ismail Duale, Garaad Cabdirisaaq Garaad Soofe Durraan.

Somaliland finance company Dahabshiil announces it will provide $200,000 to help displaced people in Las Anod.

Nicholas Delaunay, director of the International Crisis Group's East and Southern Africa Project, said Somaliland has provided no concrete evidence of Al-Shabaab's involvement and that deeper issues behind the conflict must be addressed quickly.

On February 23, United Nations Human Rights Council reported that more than 185,000 people, 89% of them women and children, have been displaced by the fighting in Las Anod that began on February 6.

On February 25, a Somaliland military spokesman said, "Hostile forces with al-Shabaab background broke the ceasefire agreement and attacked Somaliland forces. The attack was repulsed and much of the city remains under the control of Somaliland forces."

On February 26, Somaliland's Foreign Minister, Essa Kayd, announced the final withdrawal of troops from the front lines in Las Anod to designated military units in order to minimize civilian impact.

He also said that al-Shabaab was behind the disturbances and that they chose Las Anod as a place of refuge because they were driven out of central Somalia.

On February 28, a major hospital was hit by four mortar rounds, killing at least one person and wounding several others. Somaliland's Ministry of Defense denied that the military shelled the hospital and said such reports were "fake news" intended to damage the military's reputation.

Since March 1, no major fighting has occurred and life has resumed peacefully. However, the devastation is evident, and there are major obstacles such as the roads to Burco and Bosaso, the source of supplies in peacetime.

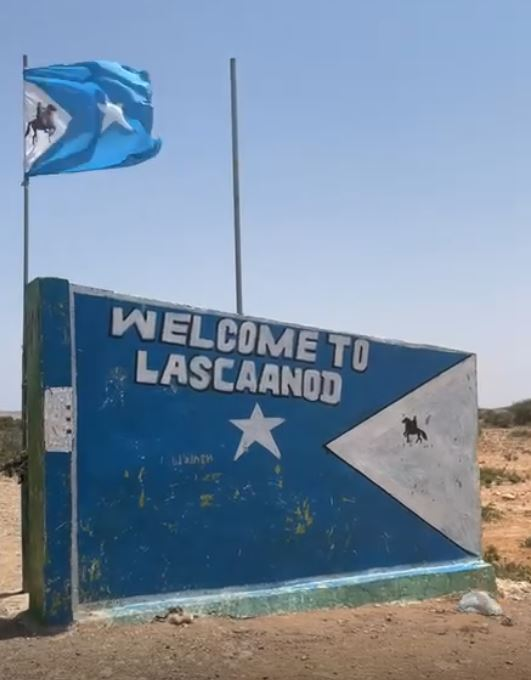
Welcome sign to Las Anod

On March 2, the Prime Minister of the Federal Republic of Somalia said, "In 1988, the Somali government launched a war against the civilian population. It is unfortunate that the same scenario is being repeated now," he said.

On March 8, Somaliland military commander Nuh Ismail Tani announced in a media interview, "We have the right and the ability to retake Las Anod, but we are abiding by the government ceasefire agreement."

On March 9, the Somaliland government said that among the fighters fighting Somaliland forces in Las Anod were troops from Ethiopia's Somali regional government. The Ethiopian government denies it.

On August 25, 2023, Khatumo State forces achieved a decisive victory, successfully driving Somaliland forces out of Las Anod.

== Politics ==
Voters in the parliamentary and municipal elections across Somaliland

Las Anod is the centre of political power of the Dhulbahante clan. As of 2021, Las Anod constituents are represented by 12 members parliament representing Sool elected in the Somaliland parliamentary elections. With nominal participation in the Somaliland elections, a mere 5 representatives hail from the Dhulbahante which almost exclusively inhabit the Sool region. From the 2005 parliamentary elections onwards, the Isaaq clans in Aynaba District have benefited disproportionally from the absence of this community. Hoehne explains:

Members of the Darod clan-family in eastern Somaliland, in the regions Sool and Sanaag, early on took a stand against secession. Most of them did not participate in the constitutional referendum and in the subsequent elections. As a result, Somaliland has largely become a ‘mono-clan state’ today: all important offices in the country are held by members of the most populous Isaaq clan-family.

Additionally, residents are represented by 13 local councillors elected in the Somaliland municipal elections.

In the 2021 parliamentary and municipal elections about 100,000 residents registered to vote across the Sool region with a thin majority registering in the capital Las Anod. This was a dismal voter turnout as the acceptance of Somaliland’s presence in the eastern regions remains uneven. The Crisis Group reports:

The representation of some clans also suffered as a result of dismal turnout in the east, where popular acceptance of rule by Somaliland authorities remains extremely uneven. The eastern parts of the Sool and Sanaag regions, as well as the district of Buuhoodle in Togdheer, are primarily inhabited by the Dhulbahante and Warsangali sub-clans of the Darod clan. They have been subject to a long-running territorial contest between Somaliland and Puntland (a Somali member state).

Abdirisak Khalif who hails from Las Anod was also selected as the speaker of Somaliland's house of representatives in the same year.

== Geography ==
Las Anod is strategically positioned in the Nugaal Valley and along the trade routes in Somaliland and Puntland. The city is almost surrounded by hills and has considerable water resources, the latter of which makes it a prime destination for peoples from other parts of generally arid regions within Somaliland as well as from neighboring countries such as Somalia, Djibouti and Ethiopia.

== Economy ==
Shops in Las Anod.

Evictions carried out in 2021 were reportedly due to business rivalries between locals and residents from South West State of Somalia. According to a recent research report, the Berbera and Bosaso ports are the main sources of commodities that arrive in Las Anod:

Lasanod has seen an increase in trade relations with the ‘east’ (Puntland) and the ‘north- west’ (Somaliland) since the early 1990s.39 Interviewees estimated that some 80 per cent of commodities in the city originate from either Berbera or Bossaso ports. Imported food commodities such as rice, sugar, or wheat flour and bagaash (bundles of packaged consumer goods), building materials, electronics, clothes and vegetables and fruits are the main commodities traded in Lasanod.

== Demographics ==
According to the UNFPA 2014 population estimate the Las Anod District has an estimated population of 156,438 inhabitants.

The city is primarily inhabited by people from the Somali ethnic group, in particular by the Dhulbahante sub-clan of the Harti Darod. The gaashaanbuur subclan of Shiikhyaale especially well represented. The Fiqishini (Hawiye) which at times form part of Baho Nugaaled are also present in Las Anod.

In the 1950s, Ioan Lewis described the lineage cleavage running through the city as follows:

In Las Anod ... town composed of movable nomadic huts is divided into two distinct territorial divisions along the lines of lineage cleavage. One sector is dominated by the Faarah Garaad segment and the other by the opposed Mahamuud Garaad, these being the two main segments of the clan.

== Education ==
Las Anod has numerous primary schools which include both private and public. Currently there are 6 Primary Schools in the city of Las Anod; Gol Khatumo, Gateway, Abyan, Ilays, Imam Shafi and Sool primary schools.

Secondary school education is provided by Ilays Educational Academy, Muse Yusuf and Nugaal High Schools. Founded in 2004, Nugaal University (NU) is the first post-secondary institution of higher learning to be established in the area. The first group of four-year Nugaal University students graduated in September 2009. Also there are Ilays National University and Gollis University both established in Las Anod in 2015.

Manhal Hospital

There are also a number of academic institutions in Las Anod which provide diverse education services such as Sool Institute of Heath Sciences (SIHS), Al-Furqan Islamic Institute, Sahal Software College, Future Technology Center etc.

== Climate ==
Las Anod has a hot arid climate (Köppen BWh) with consistently very warm to hot temperatures and almost no rainfall except erratically in May and October.

Climate data for Las Anod
Month	Jan	Feb	Mar	Apr	May	Jun	Jul	Aug	Sep	Oct	Nov	Dec	Year
Mean daily maximum °C (°F)	27.9 (82.2)	30.1 (86.2)	30.8 (87.4)	32.3 (90.1)	32.5 (90.5)	30.5 (86.9)	30.3 (86.5)	30.8 (87.4)	32.4 (90.3)	31.8 (89.2)	31.5 (88.7)	29.8 (85.6)	30.9 (87.6)
Daily mean °C (°F)	20.3 (68.5)	22.6 (72.7)	23.1 (73.6)	25.2 (77.4)	25.9 (78.6)	24.8 (76.6)	25.1 (77.2)	25.2 (77.4)	26.2 (79.2)	25.1 (77.2)	24.1 (75.4)	22.4 (72.3)	24.2 (75.5)
Mean daily minimum °C (°F)	12.7 (54.9)	15.1 (59.2)	15.4 (59.7)	18.2 (64.8)	19.5 (67.1)	19.1 (66.4)	19.9 (67.8)	19.7 (67.5)	20.0 (68.0)	18.5 (65.3)	16.8 (62.2)	15.1 (59.2)	17.5 (63.5)
Average rainfall mm (inches)	1 (0.0)	1 (0.0)	4 (0.2)	15 (0.6)	52 (2.0)	2 (0.1)	0 (0)	0 (0)	15 (0.6)	30 (1.2)	10 (0.4)	2 (0.1)	132 (5.2)
Source: Climate-Data.org, altitude: 691 metres or 2,267 feet

== Culture ==
=== Media ===
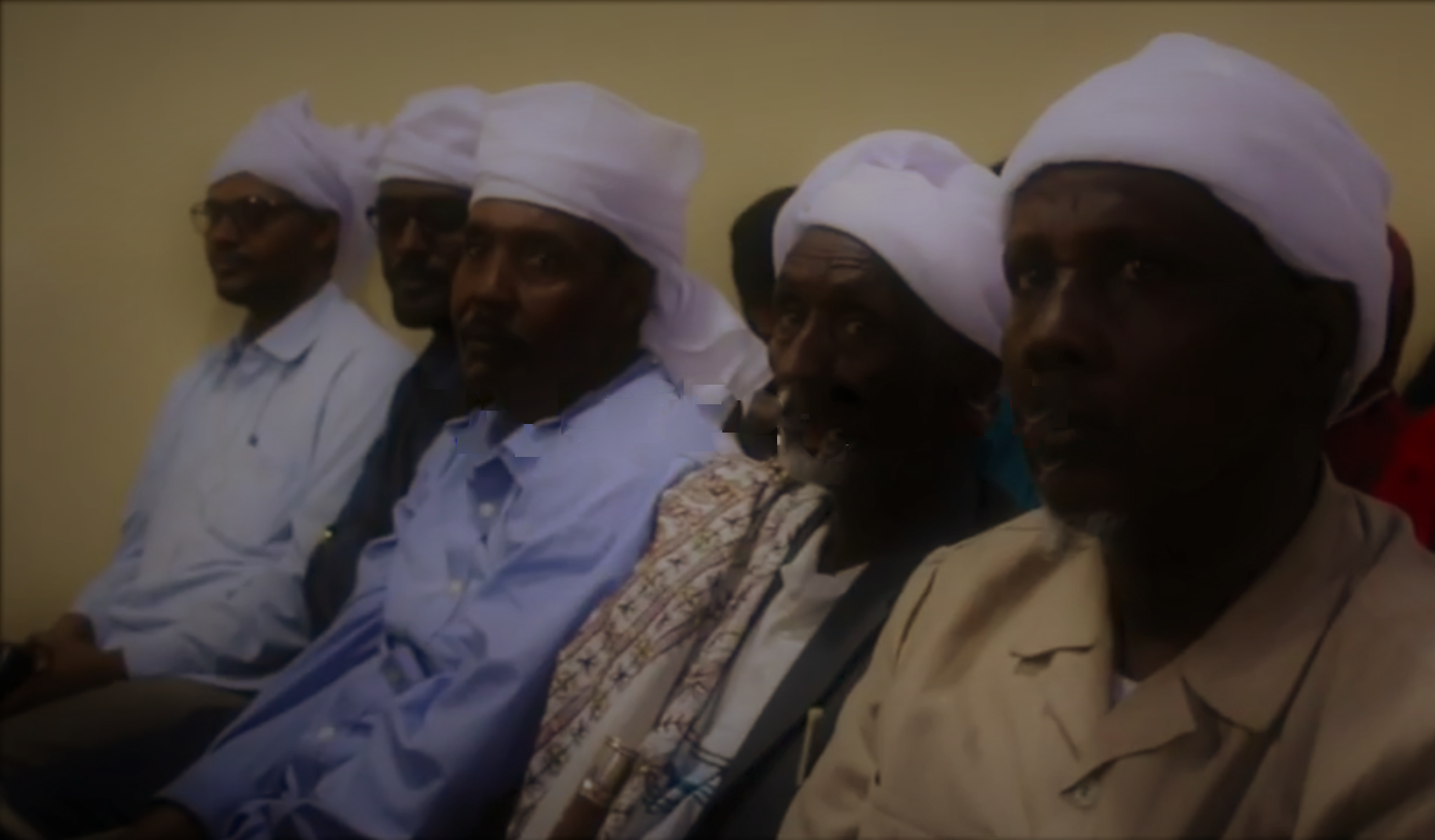
Dervish movement (1899–1920) commemoration event in Las Anod 2016, with congregants wearing Shiikhyaale attire, i.e. a Dervish duubcad

There are many media companies whom operated in Las Anod in the 2010s, including Somnews, SBS, Radio Las Anod, Universal TV.

== Notable residents ==
- Rooda Xassan, designer of Khatumo flag
- Abdi Bile, world champion long distance athlete
- Abdinasir Ali Hassan, entrepreneur and CEO of Hass Petroleum
- Abdirisak Khalif, current Speaker of the House of Representatives of Somaliland
- Abdirahman Mohamed Abdi Hashi, Minister of Fisheries and Marine Resources of Somalia
- Ali Khalif Galaydh, President of Khaatumo State and Former Prime Minister of Somalia
- Bashe Mohamed Farah, former Speaker of Somaliland House of Representatives
- Eng Mohamed Isse Lacle, Colonel in the Somali Navy and Former Deputy Minister of Ministry of Ports in Somaliland
- Garad Jama Garad Ali, Dhulbahante clan chief
- Hodan Nalayeh, TV host and journalist Media
- Mohamed Abdi Hashi, former Chairman USP & Vice President of Puntland
- Abdi Hassan Mohamed, Incumbent Police Commissioner of the Somali Police Force.
