= Mohammed Hashi Gani =

Somali military officer

General Mohammed Hashi Gani
- Native name: Xaashi Gaani
- Nickname: Hashi Gani
- Allegiance: (Somalia) Somali Democratic Republic (1980–1991) Somali National Front
- Branch: Somali National Army
- Rank: Brigadier General
- Commands: Northwest Command Somalia, Somaliland; 26th Division (Somalia) Hargeisa; Governor of Northwest Province Hargeisa
- Conflicts: Ogaden War; Afraad Rebellion; Battle of Wajaale; Atarosh Ambush; 1982 Ethiopian-Somali Border War; Somali Civil War; Mandera Assault; Operation Birjeex; Burco-Duuray offensive; Gollis campaign; Battle of the Mountains; 1988 Hargeisa-Burao offensive
- Other work: Politician in Transitional National Assembly

Mohammed Hashi Gani (Somali: Maxamed Xaashi Ghani), commonly referred to as "Hashi Gani", was a Somali military officer and Brigadier General who served in the Somali National Army under the Somali Democratic Republic from 1980 to 1991. Alongside being governor of Hargeisa in northern Somalia he led the command of the 26th Division. Hashi Gani was accused by northern Somalis belonging to the Isaaq clan of overseeing torture and killings during his time as military commander.

== Biography ==
Hashi Gani is noted for his role against the Ethiopian backed Somali National Movement (SNM) rebels, particularly in the north west regions of Somalia. Where he was appointed governor of Hargeisa, under former president of Somalia Siad Barre. During his time as governor, he was criticized for his stricter and harsher precautions against the SNM and Isaaq populations.

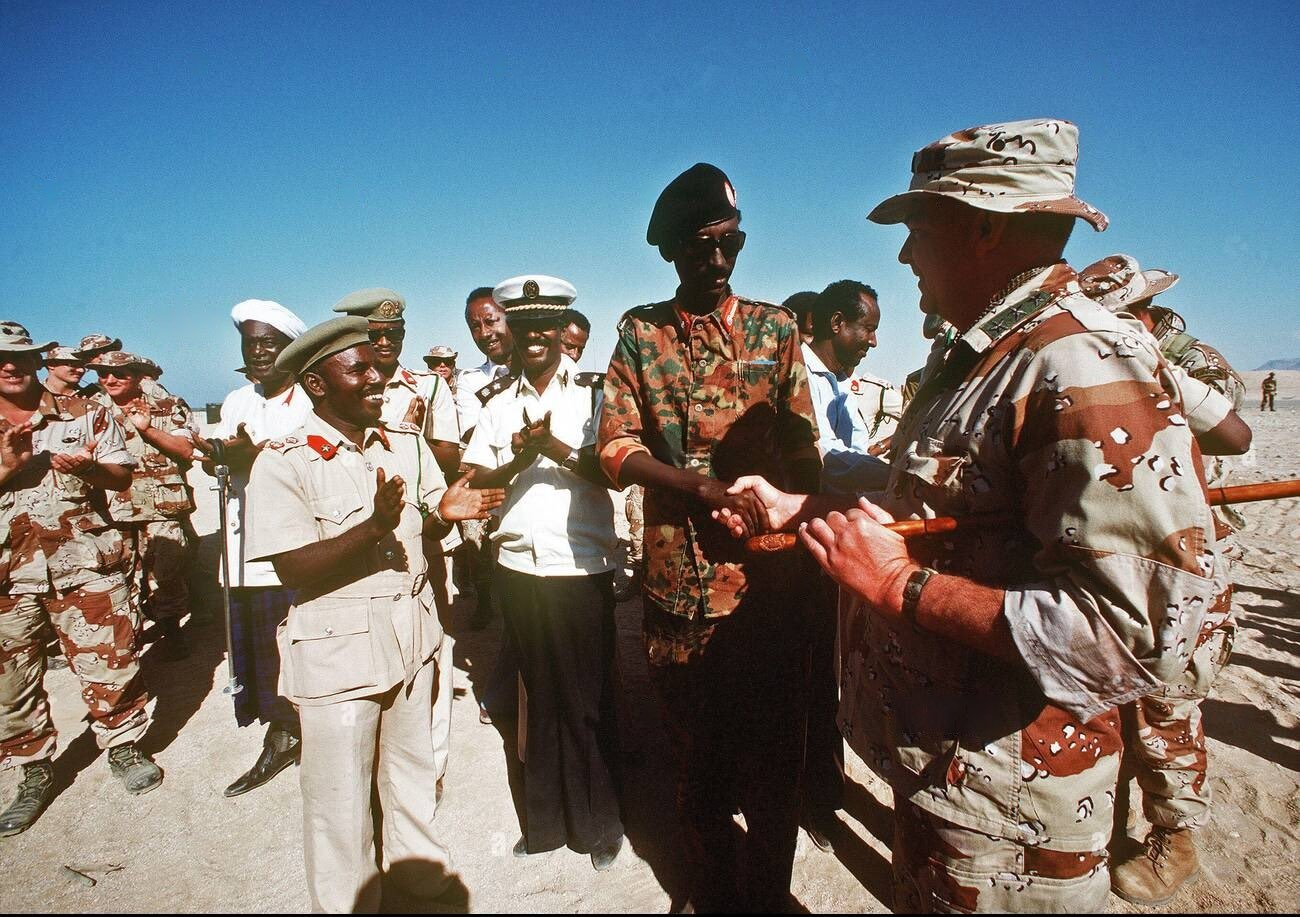
Hashi Gani shakes hands with American Robert C. Kingston commander of the Rapid Deployment Joint Task Force in Berbera

With being accused of killings and human rights abuses in the northwest regions of Somalia, Hashi Gani was interviewed in which he stated;

Anyone can accuse anyone of violations. But human rights – I was a soldier, I was defending a country. I was defending that country from a guerrilla movement that was backed by the Ethiopian government. I had obligations to protect the territorial integrity of Somalia and I was defending my borders. If you are going to call that action "human rights abuses" – I don't know what to say. I don't believe I have committed any human rights abuses.

— General Mohammed Hashi Gani,

== Career ==
=== Somali National Army ===
During the 1977 Ogaden War, Gani was a part of the commanders of the Somali troops. He saw action in multiple battles, and fought until the end of the war where the Somali Army was defeated. He was then transferred from his post in the South to the Northern part of the country, where he was appointed commander of the 26th Division (Somalia). Starting in the late 1970s, Hashi Gani would begin his career in northern Somalia. He was appointed commander of the 26th Division of the Somali National Army, based in Hargeisa in the country's north, in what is now Somaliland.

=== Afraad Rebellion ===
One of Gani's first actions was to suppress the nearby Isaaq insurgency in the Somaliland and Haud regions, Where the recently formed Afraad Movement under Mohamed Farah Dalmar Yusuf, also known as Mohamed Ali, was rebelling against the Somali army and the Western Somali Liberation Front. At first Gani attempted to disarm and forcefully move the insurgents to other parts of the country, but that failed. Gani decided to capture the leader of the Afraad Movement, so he sent some troops to ambush and capture Mohamed Ali alive. In 1979 while he was out with some of his most trusted men, Mohamed Ali was ambushed and captured in a place called Atarosh near Harshin, in the Haud Area. He was brought to the Supreme Court in Mogadishu, but was released shortly after, due to the intervention and rescue by his close friend and later SNM General, Mohamed Hashi Lihle. The Afraad Rebellion would continue until 1982, when it formally joined to form the military wing of the Somali National Movement, a Guerrilla movement formed to protect and later restore the lost independence of Somaliland.

=== SNM insurgency ===
==== Failed assassination attempt ====
On November 11, 1982, the primarily Isaaq based Somali National Movement planned an operation where they attempted to ambush and kill Gani. The operation was unsuccessful and had to be completely abandoned due to the capture of Abdillahi Askar by Gani.

In 1983 General Hashi Gani unleashed a cracked down on the SNM and captured former SNA Colonel Abdullahi Askar. Hashi Gani tortured Abdullahi Askar demanding intel, and invited the public to Hargeisa Nationals Theatre on April 12, which is Somali National Army Day. General Hashi planned to come on stage and present Abdillahi Askar half naked and badly beaten, and then publicly execute him the same day. The motive behind this was to demoralize the Isaaq civilians in Hargeisa, who were known to be great supporters of the SNM and their primary base of support, as well as the morale of the SNM itself, with Gani famously saying, "We have your most prominent one, and we will bring him before you." However, his plan failed when the SNM lead an operation code-named Operation Birjeex, where Askar was successfully rescued by his fellow SNM commander, Ibrahim Ismail Koodbur

==== Burco-Duuray offensive ====
On 17 October 1984, members of the SNM launched a coordinated assault aiming to destabilize the Somali government's control in northern Somalia. However, government forces bolstered by superior firepower and having anticipated the invasion, decisively repelled the offensive. The SNM rebels were routed, suffered considerable casualties, and afterwards retreated. SNM military commander, Mohammed Hashi Lihle was defeated and killed in action against government troops led by Hashi Gani, which was deemed a decisive victory.

The loss of Mohammed Hashi Lihle was a major setback for the SNM rebels. After the battle, Ahmed Mohamed Mohamoud (Siilaanyo) remarked:

"If Lixle is dead, we have to all be like Lixle"

=== Somali National Front ===
After the collapse of the Somali Democratic Republic, Hashi Gani was a key member of the Somali National Front (SNF), led by former loyalist to the Siad Barre regime. The SNF's political leadership, led by former Defense Minister General Omar Haji Masallah,was based in Nairobi, Kenya, while the military wing was led by General Mohammed Hashi Gani based in the city of Luuq, Gedo. The SNF would be consistently represented at all major national reconciliation and peace conferences in Somalia over the 1990s.

== See also ==
- Siad Barre
- Mohammed Said Hersi Morgan
