= Battle of Adadle =

Battle of Cadaadley
- Part of 1988 Hargeisa-Burao offensive of the Somaliland War of Independence
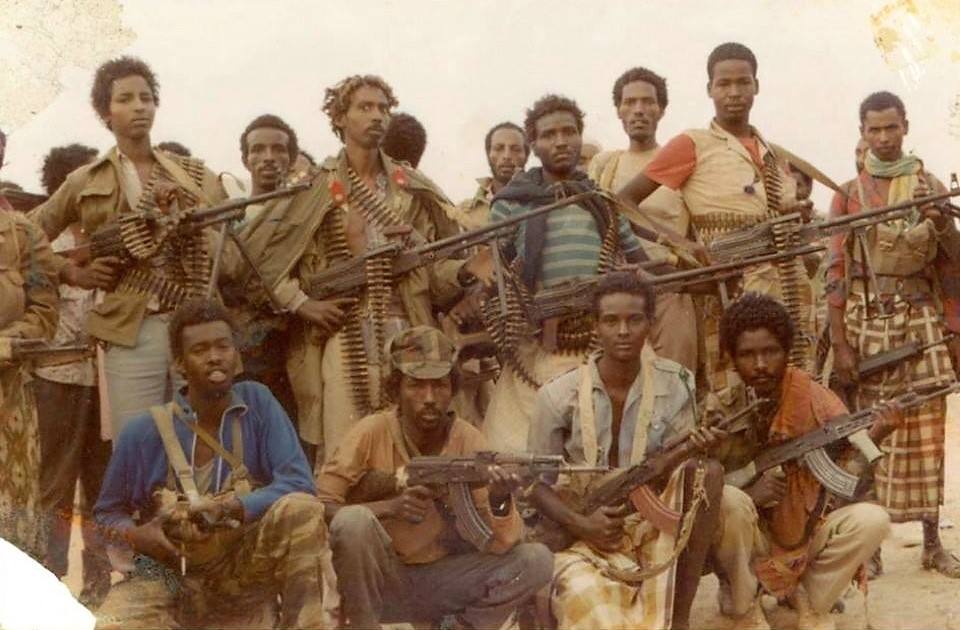
- SNM fighters in Cadaadley
Date	29 May 1988
Location	Cadaadley, near Hargeisa, Somaliland
Result	SNM victory

Belligerents
Somali National Movement	Somalia

Commanders and leaders
Mohamed Farah Dalmar Yusuf Ahmed Jama Saban (Janan Oogo)	General Kahiye †

Strength
3 brigades	1 division

Casualties and losses
Unknown	30 vehicles captured

The Battle of Cadaadley occurred on 29 May 1988 during the Somali Civil War, marking a significant offensive by the Somali National Movement (SNM) against the Somali National Army (SNA). This engagement was part of a broader campaign launched by the SNM across multiple fronts, including Hargeisa and Burco, to destabilize the Somali government’s control in the northern regions.

== Background ==
In 1988, the SNM intensified its guerrilla warfare operations against the Somali regime, transitioning into large-scale offensives aimed at liberating strategic towns. The SNM's leadership strategically planned simultaneous attacks on key locations, with Cadaadley, located approximately 90 km east of Hargeisa, being a focal point due to its military significance.

== The Battle ==
The SNM operation against the Somali National Army (SNA) garrison at Cadaadley began on 29 May 1988. The force departed from Waabo-Cado and consisted of the Sayid Ali and Barkhad brigades, together with a unit from Sh. Sancaani. The overall commander was Xuseen Axmed Guuleed, known as Xuseen Dheere.

The officers identified in accounts of the operation include Xuseen Dheere, Ahmed Hassan Waysa Ade (Waysa-cade), Ahmed Jama Saban (Janan Oogo), Mohamed Ali, Mohamed Ismail, Ali Mohamed Yusuf (Ali Gurey), Aadan Dheere and Yuusuf Gadhle. Oodweyne Media identifies Waysa-cade as commander of the Sayid Ali Brigade, Janan Oogo as its chief of operations, Mohamed Ismail as commander of the Barkhad Brigade, and Aadan Dheere as commander of the Sh. Sancaani unit. Historian Dr. Hussein Mohamed Nur also identifies Mohamed Ali and Ali Gurey among the officers involved in the attack.

The first engagement was reported near Weeraarta, followed by fighting around the 12th Division headquarters and the 86th Brigade's military camp. The fighting continued until approximately 11 pm, when the opposing forces withdrew from direct engagement until the following morning.

== Aftermath ==
On the morning of 30 May 1988, Somali government forces launched a counterattack to retake Cadaadley. The fighting lasted from approximately 7 am until 2 pm, after which SNM forces took control of the town and the military installations located there. The captured equipment included firearms, ammunition, armoured vehicles and military uniforms.

The defeat of the government forces was followed by the reported death of General Kaahiye, the commander of the 12th Division's forces at Cadaadley. Oodweyne Media attributes its account of his death to a Somali military officer who had been sent with reinforcements to the area.

The capture of Cadaadley formed part of the wider SNM offensive of May 1988, which also involved operations in Burco and Hargeisa.
