= Conflicts in the Horn of Africa =

The Horn of Africa.

Conflicts in the Horn of Africa have been occurring since the 17th century BCE. The Horn of Africa includes the modern day nation states of Djibouti, Eritrea, Ethiopia, Somalia and sometimes Kenya.

== Ancient ==
- Invasion of Ancient Egypt by the Kingdom of Kush and the Land of Punt (17th century BC).

== Medieval and Early Modern ==
- Ifat's conquest of Makhzumi (c. 1285)
- Conquests of Emperor Amda Seyon I (1314–1344)
- Battle of Gomit (1445) between the Ethiopian Empire and the Adal Sultanate
- Somali–Portuguese conflicts (1505–1543)
- Ethiopian–Adal War (1529–1559)
- Ottoman–Portuguese conflicts (1538–1560)
- Ottoman conquest of Habesh (1554/1557–1589)
- Ottoman Conquest of Zeila
- Ottoman–Portuguese conflicts (1586–1589)
- Battle of the Dindar River (1744)
- Gobroon–Bardera War (late 18th century)
- British expedition to Abyssinia (1867–1868)
- Battle of Zeila (1841)
- Egyptian–Ethiopian War (1874–1876)
- Anglo-Isaaq conflicts
- Egyptian invasion of the Eastern Horn of Africa (1874–1885)
- Menelik's Invasions (1878–1904)
- Mahdist War (1881–1899)
- Italo-Ethiopian War of 1887–1889 between the Italy and the Ethiopia
- Italian Somali Wars (1888–1924) between Italy and Somali rebels
- First Italo-Ethiopian War (1895–1896) between the Italy and the Ethiopia

== Early 20th century ==
- Somaliland campaign (1899–1920) against the United Kingdom, Italy, Ethiopia, and other Somalis
- Battle of Segale (1916) in Ethiopia
- 1922 Burao tax revolt (1922) between Habar Yoonis tribesmen and the United Kingdom
- Abyssinia Crisis (1935) between Ethiopia and Italy
- Second Italo-Ethiopian War (1935–1936) between the Kingdom of Italy and the Ethiopian Empire
- Campaign of the Sultanates 1925-1927 between Kingdom of Italy and Somali sultanates
- World War II
  - East African campaign (1940–1941) of Italy against the United Kingdom, the Commonwealth of Nations, Belgium and Ethiopia
  - Italian guerrilla war in Ethiopia (1941–1943)
- 1945 Sheikh Bashir rebellion (1945) between Habr Je'lo tribesmen and the United Kingdom

== Cold War ==
- Eritrean War of Independence (1961–1991), between Eritrean liberation fronts (primarily the EPLF and early on also the ELF) and the Ethiopian Empire (1961–1974) and Marxist Derg-ruled Ethiopia (1974–1991)
- 1961 revolt in Somalia Between Somaliland secessionists and unionists in Somalia
- Somali–Kenyan conflict (from 1963)
  - Shifta War (1963–1967), separatist insurgency by ethnic Somalis in Kenya
- 1970 Zeila uprising, Anti communist and Separatist uprising in western Somaliland
- Eritrean Civil Wars (1972–1974;1980–1981) between the EPLF and ELF
- Ethiopian Civil War (1974–1991), between the Derg and various rebel groups; included the Red Terror
- Oromo conflict (from 1973)
- Ogaden War (1977–1978) between Ethiopia and Somalia
- Somaliland War of Independence (1981–1991), between the Somali National Movement and Somalia
  - Afraad Rebellion
- Ethiopian–Somali Border War (1982)

== Post-Cold War ==
- Somali Civil War (1991–present)
  - War in Somalia (2006–2009)
  - Somali Civil War (2009–present)
- Djiboutian Civil War (1991–1994)
- Hanish Islands conflict (1995) between Yemen and Eritrea
- Second Afar insurgency (1995–2018)
- Insurgency in Ogaden (1995–2018)
  - 2007–2008 Ethiopian crackdown in Ogaden
- Eritrean–Ethiopian War (1998–2000)
- Puntland-Somaliland dispute (1998–present)
- Djiboutian–Eritrean border conflict (2008)
- Gedeo– Guji clashes (1995–2018)
- Oromia–Somali clashes (2016–2018)
- Ethiopian civil conflict (2018–present)
  - Oromo conflict (1973–2024)
    - OLA insurgency (2018–2024)
  - Tigray War (2020–2022)
  - Benishangul-Gumuz conflict (2019–2022)
  - Afar–Somali clashes (2020–2024)
  - War in Amhara (2023–present)
- Al-Fashaga conflict (2020–2022)
- Al-Shabaab invasion of Ethiopia (2022)
- Las Anod conflict (2023)

== See also ==
- Political history of Eastern Africa (for ancient, medieval, and early modern conflicts)
- History of Djibouti
- History of Eritrea
- History of Ethiopia
- History of Somalia
- History of Somaliland
