= Mohamed Farah Dalmar Yusuf =

Somali military commander and revolutionary

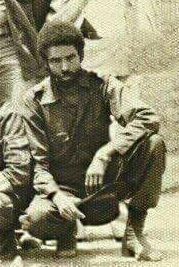

Military leader of Western Somali Liberation Front
- In office 1975–1978

Military leader of Somali National Movement
- In office 1981–1988

Military leader of Afraad
- In office 1978–1981

Personal details
- Born: 1938 Haji Salah, Togdheer, British Somaliland (now Somaliland)
- Died: 28 July 1988 (aged 49–50) Haqaya Malaas, Togdheer, Somali Republic
- Children: 2
- Occupation: Military commander

Military service
- Battles/wars: Arab–Israeli conflict; Aden Emergency; 1970 Zeila uprising; Ogaden War; Somali invasion of Ogaden; Battle of Jijiga; Somaliland War of Independence; Afraad Rebellion; Dhabarooble Ambush; Battle of Gaashaamo; Battle of Wajaale; Mandera Assault; Operation Birjeex; Gollis campaign (1984); Battle of the Mountains; Battle of Sheikh; Battle of Sheikh Pass; 1988 Hargeisa-Burao offensive; Battle of adadle; Battle of Debis; Battle of Werarta (1988); Mandera Assault; Hargeisa-Berbera Road Ambush; Battle of Burao †

Mohamed Farah Dalmar Yusuf "Mohamed Ali" (Somali: Maxamed Faarax Dalmar Yuusuf "Maxamed Cali", Arabic: محمد فارح دلمر يوسف "محمد علي";) (1938 – 28 July 1988) was a Isaaq Nationalist, military general, Somaliland Nationalist, and revolutionary. He is known for his leadership within Western Somali Liberation Front, Afraad and later the Somali National Movement. Mohamed belonged to the Habr Yunis sub-division of the Garhajis Isaaq clan.

== Early Life and Background ==
Mohamed Ali was born in 1938 in the small town of Haji Salah, In the Haud region of British Somaliland, near the border with Ethiopia. He was born to his father, a merchant called Farah Dalmar Yusuf from the Ali Sa’id family of the Habr Yunis subclan of the isaaq. His early life was marked with difficulties, Including the death of his mother.

== Early military career ==
Yusuf acquired his first military experience in the ranks of the Palestine Liberation Organization. He also had taken part in the Lebanese Civil War.

== Zeila uprising ==
In 1970, Mohamed Farah Dalmar traveled to Aden in the People's Democratic Republic of Yemen, then a communist state, accompanied by an Adari associate known only as Ramadan. There, they opened a political office with vague subversive intentions. At the time, the newly formed Supreme Revolutionary Council had taken power in Somalia, and its long-term objectives were unclear amid the complexities of the Cold War. The SRC requested the closure of Mohamed Ali’s office, but the PDRY declined, citing that the office had been established at the request of the Iraqi government, was staffed by individuals with Syrian passports, and was ostensibly linked to Eritrean causes. In reality, it appeared to be an Arab revolutionary collaboration involving the Baath parties of Iraq and Syria, facilitated by the PDRY, and hosting a mix of loosely aligned actors with various agendas. Mohamed Ali, driven more by 'Isaaq nationalist' sentiment and a desire to reinstate the 1960 State of Somaliland, than Marxist ideology, viewed the SRC's rise as akin to the return of Muḥammad ibn 'Abdallāh Hassan, claiming that their mission was to prevent this new perceived threat from consolidating power. Ali and his colleague began recruiting Somalis in Yemen, eventually gathering 36 men, and obtained six guerrilla warfare trainers from the Yemeni government. However, their attempted infiltration into Somalia, by boat to a coastal point between Zeyla and Lughaya, ended in failure. Betrayed by a double agent, they were ambushed by Somali National Army forces; a brief firefight ensued in which Ramadan and four other commandos were killed, and the rest—including Mohamed Ali—were captured. Ali was released in 1975 and later played a key role in preparations for the Somali invasion of Ogaden.

=== Role in the Ogaden war and WSLF ===
Upon his release from prison in 1975, he became the military leader of the Western Somali Liberation Front and was at the forefront of the 1977 invasion of Ethiopia by Somali forces. In 1979 Mohamed Ali became the head of the Fourth Brigade of the Western Somali Liberation Front known as Afraad.

=== Role in the Somali National Movement and the Somaliland War of Independence ===
Yusuf's is considered the first military commanders of SNM, and one of the first Generals to cross the Ethiopia–Somalia border to establish permanent base for the rebels in Ethiopia.

== Death ==
Muhammad Ali was killed during the 1988 Battle of Burao, when he was leading one of the invading divisions of the 1988 Hargeisa-Burao offensive. He was fatally hit by an Airstrike while commanding troops around Burao, in Haqaya Malaas. He was hailed as a hero and a national martyr after his death.
