= 1988 Hargeisa-Burao offensive =

SNM military offensive in Somaliland

1988 Hargeisa Burao offensive
- Part of the Somaliland War of Independence
- Poster commemorating 1988 Hargeisa Burao offensive, Depicting Mujaahid Ahmed Mire
Date	27 May 1988 – 1 June 1988
Location	Hargeisa and Burao, northern Somalia (now Somaliland)
Result	SNM victory: Significant increase of manpower for the SNM; Escalation of the Isaaq genocide
Territorial changes	SNM captures Hargeisa (excluding Hargeisa Airport), Burao, Dhoqoshay, Adadley, Masaajidka, Debis, Werarta, Abdaal, Sheikh Omar, Adrosh, Samatar Ahmed and Hagal.

Belligerents
Somali National Movement	(Somalia) Somali Democratic Republic

Commanders and leaders
Ahmed Mohamed Mohamoud (Siilaanyo); Ahmed Mire; Hussein Dheere; Ibrahim Dhegaweyne; Mohamed Farah Dalmar Yusuf; Muse Bihi Abdi; Hassan Yonis Habane	(Somalia) Siad Barre (Somalia) Mohammed Said Hersi Morgan

Strength
3,000-5,700; 84 armed vehicles	30,000-60,000; 100 armed vehicles two aircraft

Casualties and losses
90 killed	300+ killed, several aircraft destroyed

The 1988 Hargeisa Burao offensive (Somali: Gudo-galkii Hargeysa iyo Burco) was a major offensive conducted during the Somaliland War of Independence in May 1988 by the Somali National Movement on the cities of Hargeisa and Burao, then the second and third largest cities of Somalia. The SNM captured Burao on 27 May within two hours, while the SNM entered Hargeisa on 29 May, overrunning most of the city apart from its airport by 1 June. During the offensive the Somali National Army committed gross human rights violations, including attacking the civilian population using heavy artillery and tanks.

== Background ==
In 1982, the Somali National Movement (shortened SNM) moved its headquarters from London to Dire Dawa, Ethiopia where 3 key military bases were established. From here, it would launch guerrilla raids into the Waqooyi Galbeed and Togdheer regions. A growing number of northern civilian recruits and defectors from the Somali army, drawn almost exclusively from the Isaaq clan, were shaped into a guerrilla force and trained to produce a hard-core of disciplined fighters. Although the Ethiopians were said to have initially only supplied ammunition, Isaaq recruits came with their own arms in addition the equipment seized from the Somalian army. Soon after, the Somalian army established the "Isaaq Exterminator" command which aimed to ethnically cleanse the Isaaq population. Over the following years, the SNM made numerous clandestine military incursions into northwest Somalia. Although these attacks never posed a direct threat to the regime's control of the area, such activities and the boldness and tenacity of its small force were a constant irritation to the Barre regime.

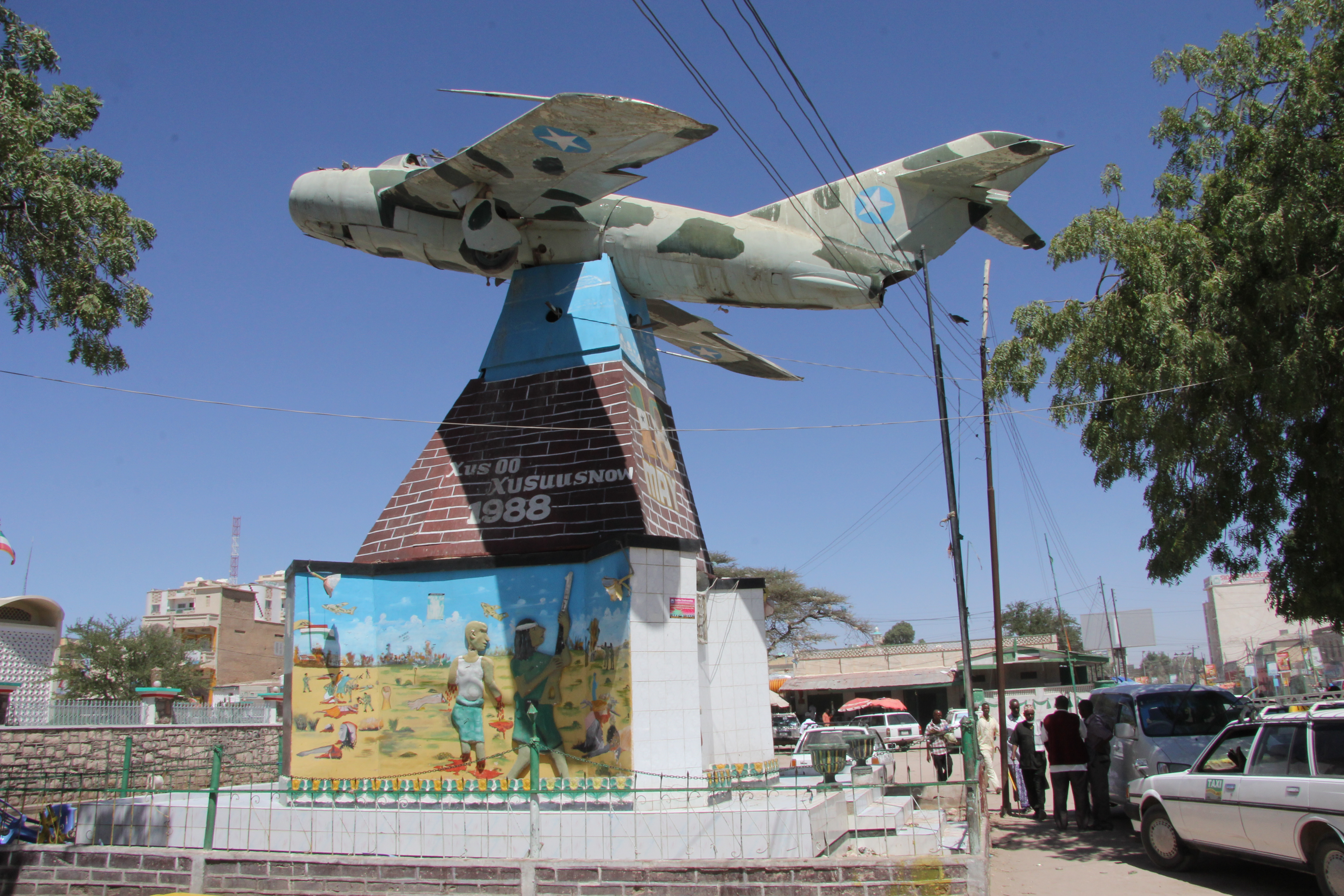
Hargeisa War Memorial, commemorating the May–June 1988 offensive

The first military offensive of the SNM took place near Baligubadle where a small force attacked a fuel tanker supplying the Somalian regime's base in the town. This operation was organised by local commanders without prior planning using a local force of Arap clansmen based in the organisation's Lanqeyrta base.

In the late 1980s, the National Security Service increased its activities against dissidents and SNM sympathizers. In response, the SNM carried out the assassination of the regional National Security Service Chief in 1986 which led to the newly appointed Northern military commander Mohammed Said Hersi Morgan unleashing a new wave of terror against the Isaaq population as set out by his "Letter of Death".

== Cause ==
In 1987, Siad Barre, the president of Somalia, frustrated by lack of success of the army against insurgents from the Somali National Movement in the north of country, offered the Ethiopian government a deal in which they stop sheltering and giving support to the SNM in return for Somalia giving up its territorial claim over Ethiopia's Somali Region. Ethiopia was in agreement and a deal was signed on 3 April 1988 that included a clause confirming agreement not to assist rebel organisations based in each other's territories. The SNM felt the pressure to cease their activities on the Ethiopia-Somalia border, and had no option but to attack the northern territories of Somalia to take control of the major cities in the north. The brutal nature of the Siad Barre government response was unprecedented, and led to what Robin Cohen described as one of the "worst civil wars in Africa".

On the 14th of March 1988, The Government attacked a convoy of SNM Fighters in the vicinity of Gabiley and Tog Wajaale but were driven off. The Government troops responded by executing 25 civilians in retaliation.

The SNM originally planned to attack Adadley, Mandera and Berbera, and to then advance into Hargeisa and Berbera, however the plan was changed at the last minute by the SNM High Command. This new plan prioritized the symbolic capture of the northern capital, Hargeisa, over a logistical blockade, and would further lengthen the war. Despite light attacks conducted by the SNM, Berbera remained under Somali government control, and the port city served as a beachhead for receiving troops and supplies from southern Somalia and overseas, unloading them, and redistributing them across the region.

== Offensive ==
1988 Hargeisa-Burao offensive (Somaliland)

The SNM's forces were divided into three regiments; Mecca, Medina and the Central Front. A total of 5,700 SNM troops took part in the large offensive.

=== Burao ===
At dusk on 26 May, the SNM units left the village of Samatar Ahmed. The unit consisted of roughly 1,200 fighters, with minimal ammunition and vehicles, and was led by Colonel Ahmed Mire. They arrived in the town of Dhoqoshay at sunset and by early morning the next day, the SNM advanced to Badhka, an execution site outside of Burao used by Barre's government. SNM troops passed Badhka and advanced directly to Burao without any resistance.

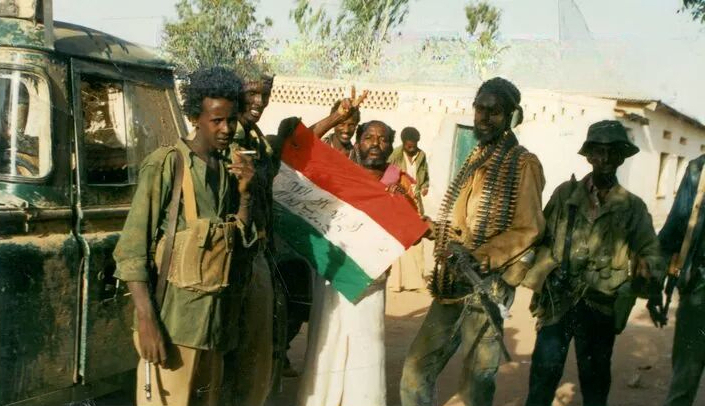
SNM fighters shortly after capturing Burao, 27 May 1988

On 27 May the Medina Front forces of the SNM launched an offensive on Burao early on Friday morning, overrunning it within 2 hours. When SNM forces reached the Baarsiigo restaurant, the unit was divided into two sections. One was heading for Burao's main bridge and the other heading for Burao's military headquarters. Almost immediately SNM fighters took over the military compound at Burao airport where the majority of Somali army soldiers were stationed, the military compound at Goon Ad (Somali: Goon Cad) in the outskirts of the city, as well as two police stations (including the central police station of Burao), Burao prison and a variety of government offices in the city. Government troops fled, leaving behind large amounts of ammunition, guns, and tanks captured and used by the SNM troops. The SNM executed a number of Somali military officers and officials.

After capturing Burao's central prison the SNM freed political prisoners (including schoolchildren). Somali troops subsequently retreated to their base in Goon Ad. Upon capturing Burao the SNM was overwhelmed with recruits, with over 30,000 men picking up arms and joining the group. During the fighting the commander of the SNM units in Burao, Colonel Ahmed Mire, suffered a head injury and was temporarily replaced by Colonel Handulleh.

=== Hargeisa ===
The western SNM forces were still behind in their preparation, thereby delaying the attack on Hargeisa. The unit marched from Masaajidka, on the Ethiopia-Somalia border at noon on 27 May.

To relieve the pressure on the SNM forces attacking Burao, 300 men were sent to attack Adadley, which hosted one of the largest Somali army defenses in northern Somalia, as well as a large weapons depot. Around 30 armed vehicles were captured, with the captured armed vehicles being distributed to other attacking groups in Hargeisa and Burao.

On 28 May, the Sayyid Omar Brigade (Somali: Guutada Sayid Cumar) captured Debis, a place in the mid-point of both the Hargeisa-Burao and Hargeisa-Berbera roads, with the goal being preventing Somali government forces from moving between the three cities. On 29 May, the Sayid Ali and Barkhad Brigades from the central regiment captured Adadley. Upon receiving news of Somali army reinforcements being sent to Werarta in preparations for a counteroffensive on Adadley, the SNM launched a sudden attack, with the SNM capturing material, including field guns and jeeps. The SNM then advanced to Abdaal, where the SNM ambushed convoys of reinforcements arriving from southern Somalia, and attacked Mandera Prison, where they freed 664 prisoners, including the former mayor of Hargeisa, Ethiopians and southern Somalis.

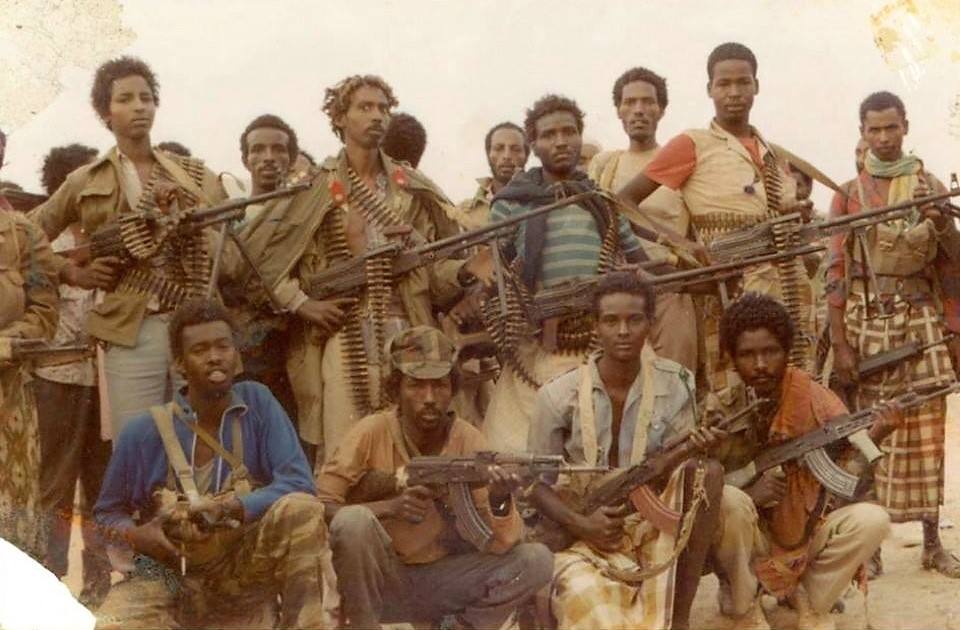
SNM fighters in Adadley

An SNM fighter who partook in the battle of Adadley recounted the SNM offensive on the village:

After this bit of luck, we continued our march until we reached the hill over Adadley, the strong government military base and depot. In Adadley, the Hussein Dheere fighters and those of the Sayid Ali and Barkhad units had attacked the government garrison from several sides. We could not see what to do, so we watched the battle for a while. But by midnight Salaan Abdi Shide had a lucky shot when he put an RPG-7 shell right in the middle of a warehouse where millions of rounds of ammunitions were piled up side by side with armoured vehicles and other military supplies. Everything exploded and then it went on burning all night long till dawn. The next morning our commander, Mohamed Ali, asked me to lead a patrol of four and go into the village of Adadley to see how things had developed. When we reached Adadley we were surprised to see our combatants sitting down with the villagers and enjoying breakfast. But they told us another strong government force was heading towards us from the south, with heavy artillery. So we went for the garrison, which was demoralised, and we surrounded them. They just ran away and we did not even try to stop them. As we entered the compound we found the dead body of the commander of the Adadley base, who had committed suicide by shooting himself through the head when he realised that his big military base had fallen into the hands of SNM.

Wounded Somali troops who claimed to be from the Hawiye clan in southern Somalia were to their surprise spared and left unharmed, being sent back to their villages of origin upon their recovery and told to not join government forces ever again. Occasionally captured Somali soldiers would, upon realizing SNM forces would not harm them, reveal hidden guns and hand them over.

On 30 May the SNM reached Sheikh Mowdhle at 5 pm, and advanced to Sheikh Omar, Adrosh and Hagal. By 7:30 pm the SNM units were roughly 300 metres from the military headquarters of the 26th Division of the Somalian army. The same day South African mercenary planes conducted airstrikes against the SNM forces. Although the SNM forces managed to shoot down a plane they took heavy casualties.

The SNM attack on Hargeisa started at 2:15 a.m. on 31 May and was led by Colonel Mohamed Ilmi Samatar and Colonel Muse Bihi Abdi. The SNM force attacking Hargeisa was estimated at 500 men equipped with 84 vehicles, of whom only 14 were left due to vehicles being sent to the front in Adadley. The SNM captured the headquarters of the 26th Division, as well as capturing the Birjeex arms depot where the SNM collected ammunition. An SNM fighter who partook in the Hargeisa offensive described Somali troops dropping their uniforms on the ground and fleeing. The SNM encountered stiff resistance from the Somalian Army as they surrounded Radio Hargeisa's headquarters. The Somalian army units withdrew to Hargeisa Airport and the hills east of the city. Due to heavy bombardment from Somalian heavy artillery and tanks, the SNM force tasked with capturing Hargeisa airport fell back and retreated to Adadley.

By 1 June, with the exception of Hargeisa Airport, the SNM overran the city. During the Somali army counterattack the SNM line of defense in the city was behind Hargeisa's radio station.

== Government retaliation and counteroffensive ==
=== Hargeisa ===
As news of the SNM advance on Burao and its capture reached government officials in Hargeisa, all banks were ordered to close, and army units surrounded the banks to prevent people from approaching. Both electricity and water-supply lines were cut from the city, and residents resorted to fetching water from streams, and due to it being the rainy season they were also able to collect water from rooftops. All vehicles (including taxis) were confiscated to control the movement of civilian population, this also ensured sufficient transport was available for the use of military and government officials. Top government officials evacuated their families to the capital Mogadishu. The period between 27 and 31 May was marked by much looting by government forces as well as mass arrests. Killings in Hargeisa started on 31 May.

A curfew was imposed on 27 May starting at 6:00 p.m, the army began systematic house-to-house searches, looking for SNM fighters. On the following day the curfew started earlier at 4:00 pm; the third day at 2:00 pm; and on the fourth day at 11:00 am.

Anticipating fighting to start, people stock-piled food, coal and other essential supplies. Government forces looted all warehouses and shops, with the open market of the city being one of their prime targets. Soldiers raided mosques and looted its carpets and loudspeakers. Later, civilians would be killed inside mosques. A significant number of civilian deaths at the time occurred as a result of government soldiers robbing them, those who refused to hand valuables (watches, jewellery and money) or were not quick enough to comply with soldiers' demands were shot on the spot. Another major cause of civilian deaths was food robbery, this was reportedly because the soldiers were not being supplied by the government.

Artillery shelling of Hargeisa started on the third day of the fighting and was accompanied by large-scale aerial bombing of the city carried out by aircraft of the Somali Air Force. Somali government aircraft "took off from the Hargeisa Airport and then turned around to make repeated bombing runs on the city".

The scale of destruction was unprecedented, up to 90 percent of the city (then the second largest city in Somalia) was destroyed, (United States embassy estimated 70 percent of the city was damaged or destroyed). The testimony of Aryeh Neier, the co-founder of Human Rights Watch, confirms the large-scale nature of government attacks against civilians:

In an attempt to dislodge the SNM, the government is using artillery and air bombardment, especially Hargeisa and Buroa, on a daily basis, aiming particularly at civilian population targets. Reports from eye witnesses speak of the town of Hargeisa as mere rubble, devastated to the point that it is barely recognizable even to its inhabitants.

The Guardian reported the scale of destruction as follows:

The civil war left Hargeisa in ruins: 80 percent of the building in the town were destroyed, many of them by the aerial bombardment of General Siad Barre's Zimbabwean mercenary pilots. The view from the air is of a town without roofs. The exposed pale green and blue plaster walls reflect the sunlight.

Many of the houses are boarded up because of the small anti-personnel mines scattered by Gen Siad Barre's forces when tens of thousands of Hargeisa residents fled. What was not destroyed was looted.

Other descriptions of what took place in Hargeisa include:

Siad Barre focused his wrath (and American-supported military might) against his Northern opposition. Hargeisa, Somalia's second city and the former capital of British Somaliland was bombed, strafed and rocketed. Some 50,000 people are believed to have lost their lives there as a result of summary executions, aerial bombardments and ground attacks. The city itself was destroyed. Streams of refugees fleeing the devastation were not spared by government planes. The term "genocide" came to be used more and more frequently by human rights observers.

Amnesty International confirmed the large-scale targeting and killing of civilian population by Somali government troops. The campaign had completely destroyed Hargeisa, causing its population of 500,000 to flee across the border and the city was "reduced to a ghost town with 14,000 buildings destroyed and a further 12,000 heavily damaged". The Congressional General Accounting Office team noted the extent to which residential districts were especially targeted by the army:

Hargeisa, the second largest city in Somalia, has suffered extensive damage from artillery and aerial shelling. The most extensive damage appeared to be in the residential areas where the concentration of civilians was highest, in the marketplace, and in public buildings in the downtown area. The U.S. Embassy estimated that 70 percent of the city has been damaged or destroyed. Our rough visual inspection confirms this estimate.

Much of Hargeisa appears to be a "ghost town," and many homes and building are virtually empty. Extensive looting has taken place even though the military has controlled the city since late July 1988. We were told that private property was taken from homes by the military in Hargeisa. Homes are devoid of doors, window frames, appliances, clothes, and furniture. The looting has resulted in the opening of what are called "Hargeisa markets" throughout the region, including Mogadishu and Ethiopia, were former residents have spotted their possessions. One observer remarked that Hargeisa is being dismantled piece by piece. We were told that long lines of trucks heavily laden with Hargeisa goods could be seen leaving the city, heading south towards Mogadishu after the heavy fighting had stopped.

The Governor of Hargeisa estimates the present population to be around 70,000, down from a pre-conflict population figure of 370,000. However, the current residents of Hargeisa are not believed to be the former Issak residents. Observers believe that Hargeisa is now composed largely of dependents of the military, which has a substantial, visible presence in Hargeisa, a significant number of Ogadeni refugees, and squatters who are using the properties of those who fled.

The report also stated that the city was without electricity or a functioning water system, and that the Somali government was "actively soliciting multilateral and bilateral donors for reconstruction assistance" of cities primarily destroyed by the government's own forces.

=== Burao ===
After Somali troops retreated to Goon Ad, in the late afternoon, off-duty soldiers regrouped and entered the center of the city. According to reports by Human Rights Watch's Africa Watch, the soldiers, upon entering the city, went on a rampage on 27 and 28 May. This included "dragging men out of their houses and shooting them at point blank range" and summary killing of civilians, the report also noted that "civilians of all ages who had gathered in the centre of town, or those standing outside their homes watching the events were killed on the spot. Among the victims were many students." There was also widespread looting by the soldiers, and some people were reportedly killed as a result.

Following the first two days of the conflict, angered by the extent to which Isaaqs welcomed the SNM incursion, and frustrated by their inability to contain the SNM advance, the military started attacking the civilian population without restraint "as if it was the enemy". The military used "heavy artillery and tanks, causing severe damage, both to civilians and to property. Bazookas, machine guns, hand grenades and other weapons of mass destruction were also directed against civilian targets in Hargeisa which had also been attacked as well as in Burao."

A United States Congressional General Accounting Office team reported the Somali government's response to the SNM attack as follows:

The Somali army reportedly responded to the SNM attacks in May 1988 with extreme force, inflicting heavy civilian casualties and damages to Hargeisa and Burao....The Somali military resorted to using artillery and aerial shelling in heavily populated urban centres in its effort to retake Burao and Hargeisa. A majority of the refugees we interviewed stated that their homes were destroyed by shelling despite the absence of SNM combatants from their neighbourhoods....The refugees told similar stories of bombings, strafings, and artillery shelling in both cities and, in Burao, the use of armored tanks. The majority saw their houses either damaged or destroyed by the shelling. Many reported seeing members of their families killed in the barrage....

Refugee interviews conducted by Africa Watch described how the government separated the non-Isaaqs from the Isaaqs before the attack was initiated:

As soon as the fighting broke out, the government used loudspeakers to sort the civilians out into Darood and Isaak. They would shout, "Who is from Galkayo? Mogadishu? Las Anod? Garoe?" [Non-Isaaq territory]. They appealed to the non-Isaaks to leave so they could burn the town and all those who remained behind. Most of the people from these towns left; the government provided them with transportation.

==== Aerial bombardment and destruction of Burao ====
Somali Air Force aircraft started intense aerial bombardment of Burao on Tuesday 31 May. Burao, then the third largest city in Somalia was "razed to the ground", and most of its inhabitants fled the country to seek refuge in Ethiopia. Foreign aid workers who fled the fighting confirmed that Burao was "emptied out" as a result of the government's campaign.

== Aftermath ==
The Somalian army recaptured Burao on 17 July, and by the end of July 1988 the Somalian army managed to regain full control of both cities, due to unprecedented levels of internal reinforcements, the employment of non-Isaaq militias and armed Ogaden refugees. Moreover, external assistance to the Somalian regime including mercenary pilots from South Africa and Libya in addition to economic and military aid from the UAE and Italy played a large role in recapturing the cities. Approximately, 50,000 people were killed between March 1988 and March 1989 as a result of the Somalian Army's "savage assault" on the Isaaq population.

By June 1989, the SNM was actively mounting attacks on major hubs across the North-West, blockading transport routes and interfering with regime supplies to military garrisons. As a result, the Barre regime gradually lost control of the area by December 1989 with exception to major towns which were under active siege by the SNM. On December 5, 1989, the SNM announced that they had taken control of Hargeisa.

== See also ==
- 1991 Zeila incursion
