= Omar Elmi Dihood =

Somali psychiatrist and politician (1949–2016)

Somaliland Minister of Health
- In office 1992–1993

Somaliland Presidential Advisor
- In office 1991–2016

Personal details
- Born: 1949 British Somaliland
- Died: 4 April 2016 (aged 66–67) Hargeisa , Somaliland
- Party: Kulmiye
- Education: Frunze Military Academy
- Occupation: Psychiatrist

Military service
- Allegiance: SNM (1981–1991)

Omar Elmi Dihood (Cumar Cilmi Dixood, 1949 - 4 April 2016 Arabic: عمر علمي ديهود ) was a psychiatrist and a co founder of the Somali National Movement. Dihood was one of the few outspoken Somali Christians (Protestant) who contributed to the founding of the SNM. He later served as a presidential advisor to three consecutive Somaliland Presidents and minister of health. Dihood is widely regarded as the foundational father of the SNM

== Early life ==
Born in 1949 Dihood was raised in British Somaliland. He hails from Arap clan, a wider sub clan of the Isaaq. In his adolescences he joined the Somali national army but defected in 1977 to London, England.

== Role in SNM ==
Following the aftermath of the Ogaden War in 1978, Omar Elmi Dihood was among the early figures involved in the formation of the Somali National Movement (SNM) in London, alongside Ahmed Jimaale. Contemporary accounts describe Dihoud as advocating a secular political orientation within the SNM. Dihood was a member of the SNUP, a precursor to the SNM where he regularly held meetings with Isaaq intellectuals in the Marlborough pub in London.

I.M lewis writes:

''It might thus be more accurate to regard the SNUP not, as a political party, but as a small group of intellectuals who became the spearhead of every new organization or formation that led to the emergence of the SNM.''

Dihood was particularly more critical of religiously conservative elements within the SNM, arguing that the movement should remain politically rather than religiously driven. Dihood was instrumental in organising and coordinating fundraising efforts for the SNM, as well as protests in United Kingdom against the government of Siad Barre.

== Political career and death ==
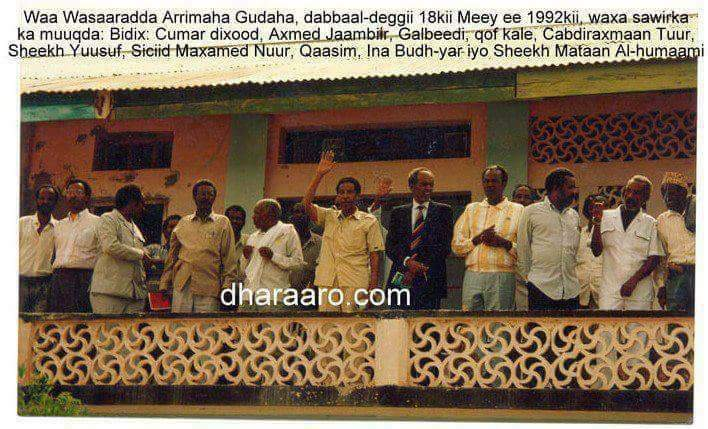
Dihood pictured first left with Tuur

After the collapse of the Somali government, Dihood dedicated himself to mental health work where he served as a minister of health and advisor to three Somaliland presidents before passing away in April 2016. Dihood helped reconcile clan disputes and was key in Somaliland reconciliation process
