= Battle of the Mountains =

SNM engagement in Somaliland

- Part of Somaliland War of Independence
Date	November 25, 1984
Location	Sheikh Mountains and Ga’an Libah Mountains
Result	SNA victory

Belligerents
Somali National Movement	Somalia

Commanders and leaders
Mohamed Ali; Abdullahi Askar; Mohamed Kahin Ahmed; Ibrahim Dhagahweyne; Muse Bihi; Maxamed Ibraahim Cismaan; Cabdillaahi Axmed Dhimbiil †; Cabdi-weli Cabdi Caabbi (WIA); Maxamed Cabdi Ibraahim †	General Hashi Gani; Gen Jihaad †

The Battle of the Mountains (Somali: Dagaalkii Buuraha) took place on November 25, 1984, during the Somali Civil War. The conflict was a key confrontation between the Somali National Movement (SNM) and the Somali government forces under President Siad Barre. The SNM launched an assault on the mountainous regions of Somaliland, aiming to resist the oppressive regime and secure the region's autonomy.

== Background ==
The SNM, formed as a response to Siad Barre's authoritarian rule, sought to challenge the government's control over northern Somalia. The battle was part of a broader struggle for independence and autonomy, particularly for Somaliland, which was seeking to separate from the rest of Somalia.

== The battle ==
The battle was fought across several fronts:

- Western Front: Led by Colonel Abdillahi Askar, the SNM attacked the government forces of the Awdal-based 26th Battalion, which numbered several thousand soldiers, with a much smaller force of 140 SNM fighters.
- Eastern Front: Mohamed Kahin Ahmed led 130 SNM soldiers in an assault on the Mirriya and Goliska mountains.
- Sheikh Mountain Front: SNM forces, led by Ibrahim Degaweyne, Maxed Cali, and C/salaan Gabaxadi, fought on the strategic Sheikh Mountain.

=== Encirclement and Retreat ===
During the battle, the SNM fighters, many of whom were civilians such as teachers, students, and businessmen, found themselves surrounded by government troops. The government forces utilized air surveillance and helicopters to target the SNM positions. As night fell, the SNM fighters were forced to retreat to higher ground, where they regrouped in the dark.

In the early hours of the morning, 36 SNM soldiers managed to break free from the government's encirclement and continued their fight eventually retreating.

== Aftermath ==
The Battle of the Mountains was a significant loss for the SNM, whereas they suffered significant losses whilst their counterparts only lost a small fraction of their force. Despite the loss, the SNM would continue the larger struggle for Somaliland's independence and autonomy throughout the following years. This battle also highlighted the resilience of the SNM fighters, many of whom were ordinary civilians mobilized against the government's brutal repression.
