= 1970 Zeila uprising =

1970 rebellion in Somaliland

1970 Zeila revolt
- Part of the Conflicts in the Horn of Africa and separatism in Somalia
Date	21, April, 1970
Location	Zeila and Lughaya, northern Somalia (today Somaliland)
Result	uprising suppressed

Belligerents
Somali Democratic Republic	separatist rebels Supported by: Iraq; Syria; South Yemen

Commanders and leaders
Siad Barre; Saleban Dafle	Mohamed Ali (POW); Ramadan Adari †

Strength
Unknown	36 armed men

Casualties and losses
Unknown	4 killed, rest captured

The 1970 Zeila revolt was an armed insurgency in Zeila led by Mohamed Farah Dalmar Yusuf. The rebellion was fuelled by an anti-marxist sentiment and a desire to reinstate the 1960 State of Somaliland, for which he was labelled an ‘Ishaq Nationalist’. The revolt was backed by the Ba’athist-led countries of Iraq and Syria.

== Background ==
=== Unification ===
Following the 1960 unification of the Trust Territory of Somaliland with the State of Somaliland, tensions quickly emerged due to political, clan, and institutional disparities. The two territories had joined under differing Acts of Union, prompting the newly formed Somali Republic's parliament to draft a new unified Act. This Act was widely rejected in the north, where many viewed it as illegitimate. A national referendum was held despite the objections, with much of the north boycotting the vote. Only around 100,000 northerners participated, and over 60% of them opposed the union. Nevertheless, the referendum passed.

=== Social, political and economic marginalisation ===
Discontent deepened as southern politicians, particularly from the Hawiye and Darod clans, came to dominate the government, marginalizing the northern Isaaq clan. Many in the north feared their region would become a neglected outpost. To address growing unrest, several northern officials and military officers were reassigned to southern posts.

In addition to these broader tensions, personal grievances also emerged among northern officers. Some resented being placed under southern superiors whom they regarded as less educated and unfit for command. There was also a perception that the government favored Italian-trained officers from the south over British-trained officers from the north. At least 24 junior officers, many British-trained, began plotting to dissolve the union between Somalia and Somaliland. One conspirator, Hussein Ali Duale, would later become a prominent Somaliland separatist. The plotters believed they had the support of General Daud Abdulle Hirsi, head of the Somali National Army.

=== 1961 revolt ===
In December 1961, the officers launched a coup attempt aimed at seizing key towns in Somaliland. However, according to researcher Ken Menkhaus, the revolt was ill-conceived and lacked support among the local population and troops. One faction occupied the radio station in Hargeisa, claiming support from General Hirsi, while another attempted to arrest southern officers in Burao but failed.

== The revolt ==
In 1970, Mohamed Farah Dalmar traveled to Aden in the People's Democratic Republic of Yemen, then a communist state, accompanied by an Adari associate known only as Ramadan. There, they opened a political office with vague subversive intentions. At the time, the newly formed Supreme Revolutionary Council had taken power in Somalia, and its long-term objectives were unclear amid the complexities of the Cold War. The SRC requested the closure of Mohamed Ali's office, but the PDRY declined, citing that the office had been established at the request of the Iraqi government, was staffed by individuals with Syrian passports, and was known to be Eritreans . In reality, it appeared to be an Arab revolutionary collaboration involving the Baath parties of Iraq and Syria, facilitated by the PDRY, and hosting a mix of loosely aligned actors with various agendas. Mohamed Ali, driven more by 'Isaaq nationalist' sentiment and a desire to reinstate the 1960 State of Somaliland, than Marxist ideology, viewed the SRC's rise as akin to the return of Muḥammad ibn 'Abdallāh Hassan, claiming that their mission was to prevent this new perceived threat from consolidating power. Ali and his Ethiopian colleague began recruiting Somalis in Yemen, eventually gathering 36 men, and obtained six guerrilla warfare trainers from the Yemeni government. However, their attempted infiltration into Somalia, by boat to a coastal point between Zeyla and Lughaya, ended in failure. Betrayed by a double agent, they were ambushed by Somali National Army forces; a brief firefight ensued in which Ramadan and four other commandos were killed, and the rest—including Mohamed Ali—were captured.

== Aftermath ==
The rebellion lasted a few days, where the rebels were ultimately defeated, 4 rebels were killed and the rest captured, including Mohamed Farah Dalmar Yusuf himself with his Harari friend Ramadan killed. Ali was released in 1975 and later played a role in preparations for the Somali invasion of Ogaden.
