= Haji Salah =

Haji Salah Xaaji Saalax (Somali)
- Town
- Location within Togdheer Location within Somaliland Location within Ethiopia
- Coordinates: 8°35′27″N 45°14′28″E
- Country: Somaliland
- Region: Togdheer
- District: Oodweyne District
- Founded: 1948
- Time zone: UTC+3 (EAT)

Haji Salah (Haji Saleh, Haji Salax, Xaaji Saalax) is a town in Togdheer, Somaliland, bordering Ethiopia. The town is classified as a Class D district by the Somaliland government. Bilciljabe village (Bilililjabe, Bilcijabe) is located just northeast of the town.

== Recent History ==
In 1948, Haji Salah was founded as a town based on around a well.

Haji Salah became one of the bases when the Somali National Movement (later the Somaliland government) moved into now Somaliland. This led then Somalian regime under Siad Barre to burn Haji Saleh twice in 1983. All water reservoirs were blown up by landmines and the inhabitants were ordered to leave within three hours. As a result, the town was uninhabited from 1983 to 1988. A Human Rights Watch's Africa Watch report states:

The village of Haji Saleh [near Burao], inhabited by Isaaks, was burned down in 1983 on the basis that it was too close to SNM bases in Ethiopia. All the water reservoirs were blown up by landmines and the people were ordered to evacuate the place within three hours. They took what they could and then the whole village was burned. Nothing was left to stand. Until the refugees from the war started to pour in, there was not a single person, not even a goat, living there from 1983-1988.

In September 2000, about 30 Ethiopian soldiers attacked Haji Saleh and killed two people, for which the President of Somaliland demanded an explanation from the Ethiopian government. However, the Ethiopian government denied this.

According to a 2002 report, Haji Saleh is listed as one of nine transit points used for trade with Ethiopia.

In 2009, the President of Somaliland designated Haji Saleh as an official district of Somaliland. According to the Somaliland Local Government Act, it is listed as Class D district.)

In February 2014, the police chief was murdered in Haji Saleh.

According to a 2017 survey, there was an IDP camp in Haji Saleh with 556 families.

In September 2019, a 9-year-old boy was attacked and killed by an eagle in the Haji Saleh district.

In January 2020, the Somaliland government granted a 12 x 12 meter plot of land in Kur-libah, 6 kilometers from Burao, to people who had moved to Burao as refugees from Haji Saleh and other places.

In November 2021, the governor of Haji Saleh requested assistance from the Somaliland government for water shortages.

In December 2022, officials from the Ministry of Environment of Somaliland visited the dam under construction in Haji Saleh.

== Education ==
As of July 2019, there are a total of eight middle schools, elementary schools, and Islamic schools. It is affiliated with Amoud University in Awdal.

== Governor ==
1. C/llaahi Yuusuf Qulunbe
2. Cismaan Yuusuf Qulinbe
3. Saleebaan Cismaan Yuusuf
4. Cabdi Axmed Nuur (Tuurane)
5. Ibraahim Cali Yuusuf
6. Khadar Cabdi Oday
7. Cali Muuse Faarax
8. Maxamed Muuse Aadam (M.muuse faroole)
