= Mandera (Somaliland) =

- Town
- Location in Somaliland
- Coordinates: 9°54′00″N 44°42′41″E
- Country: Somaliland
- Region: Maroodi Jeex
- District: Hargeisa District
- Time zone: UTC+3 (EAT)

Mandera is a town in the Maroodi Jeex province of Somaliland. Situated in the Hargeisa District, it is located northeast by road from Hargeisa and southwest of Berbera.

The town contains Mandera Prison and the Abdaal Central Mosque.

== See also ==
- Administrative divisions of Somaliland
- Regions of Somaliland
- Districts of Somaliland
