= 26th Division (Somalia) =

- Active: 1960-1991
- Country: Somalia
- Branch: Somali National Army
- Type: Division
- HQ location: Hargeisa, Somalia

The 26th Division, (Somali: Qeybta 26aad), also known as the Northern Division, was one of five Somali National Army divisions. The 26th was responsible for northern Somalia and was headquartered in the city of Hargeisa. In 1977, the division was responsible for the Dire Dawa front in the Ogaden War.

== History ==
During the Ogaden War the 26th's heavy equipment was composed of T-54 main battle tanks, T-34's and 36 BM-21 Grad artillery pieces.

General Muhammed Hashi “Gaani,” related to then Somali President Siyaad Barre’s second wife, was placed in charge of the 26th during 1980.

In January 1984 the 9th Brigade of the 26th reportedly had a short lived mutiny in Las Anod District. Clandestine anti-government radio run by the Somali National Movement (SNM) claimed that heavy fighting had started across the district against loyalist forces after members of the 9th Brigade had been ordered to massacre and harass civilians. 10 officers from the unit claimed political asylum in the United States and the commander of the 9th, Abd al-Fatah Jama Amir, was claimed to have been killed in the confrontation.

From 1986 to 1988, General Mohamed Said Hersi Morgan was the commander of the 26th Sector (the region of Somaliland) before being appointed Minister of Defense in September 1990. Divisions in the 26th Sector by this time included Division 1, Division 2 at Hargeisa, 3, and 11.

In 1988, the 26th possessed 90 operational tanks. By 1990 only 10 would be in working condition.

== Units ==
- 26th Division
  - 14th Armoured Brigade
  - ?? Armoured Brigade
  - 17th Motorised Brigade
  - ?? Motorised Brigade
  - 15th Infantry Brigade
  - 18th Infantry Brigade
  - 23rd Infantry Brigade
  - ?? Artillery Brigade
  - ?? Tank Brigade

== Commanders ==
1. Muse Hassan Sheikh Sayid Abdulle (1970 to 1971)
2. Maj Gen Mohammed Nur Gallal & Brig Gen Muhammed Farah Aidid (1977 to 1978 during the Ogaden War)
3. Gen Mohammed Hashi Gani (1980 to 1985)
4. Col Uthman Muhammed Samatar (1985 to 1986)
5. Gen Mohamed Said Hersi Morgan (1986 to 1989/1990)
6. Lt Col Ibrahim Ali Barre "Anjeeh" (1990 to 1991)
