= Afraad Movement =

Isaaq rebel movement during the Somaliland war of Independence

- Jabhadda Afraad
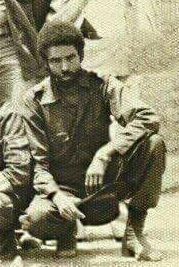
- Mohamed Farah Dalmar, also known Mohamed Ali leader of Afraad
- Leader: Mohamed Farah Dalmar Yusuf
- Dates active: 1978–1982
- Active regions: Hawd
- Part of: Somali National Movement (from 1981)
- Wars: Afraad Rebellion; Somaliland War of Independence

Afraad (The Fourth Brigade) (Somali: Afraad, Arabic: افراد), commonly known by its Amharic name Watatir Mohamed Ali (English: Army of Mohamed Ali, Somali: Wataatar Maxamed Cali, Amharic: የመሐመድ አሊ ወታደሮች), Officially called The Army of the Islamic Religion (Somali: Jabhadda Ciidanka diinta Islaamka) was one of the major units of the Western Somali Liberation Front and later an Isaaq militant group, aimed at protecting the Isaaq civilians in the Haud area. It was composed of officers originating from Somaliland. Afraad's initial objective was to liberate Somalis living in Somali Region of Ethiopia, but its focus later shifted due to increasing abuses against the north Somali civilian population perpetrated by WSLF. Killing, looting and rape of civilians by WSLF was common from 1978 onwards. This abuse was due to the Somali state employing the Ogadeni subsection of WSLF as a subsidiary militia that would be used to maintain control over the northern regions of Somalia.

== Afraad Rebellion ==
Armed clashes between Afraad and the Ogaden forces of WSLF began shortly after 1979. A North Somali army officer arrested 14 leading WSLF fighters who have been harassing and abusing the local population at Gobyar.

From February 1982, Isaaq army officers and fighters from the Fourth Brigade started moving into Ethiopia where they formed the nucleus of what would later become the Somali National Movement.
