= Hargeisa War Memorial =

Monument commemorating the independence day of Hargeisa in Somaliland

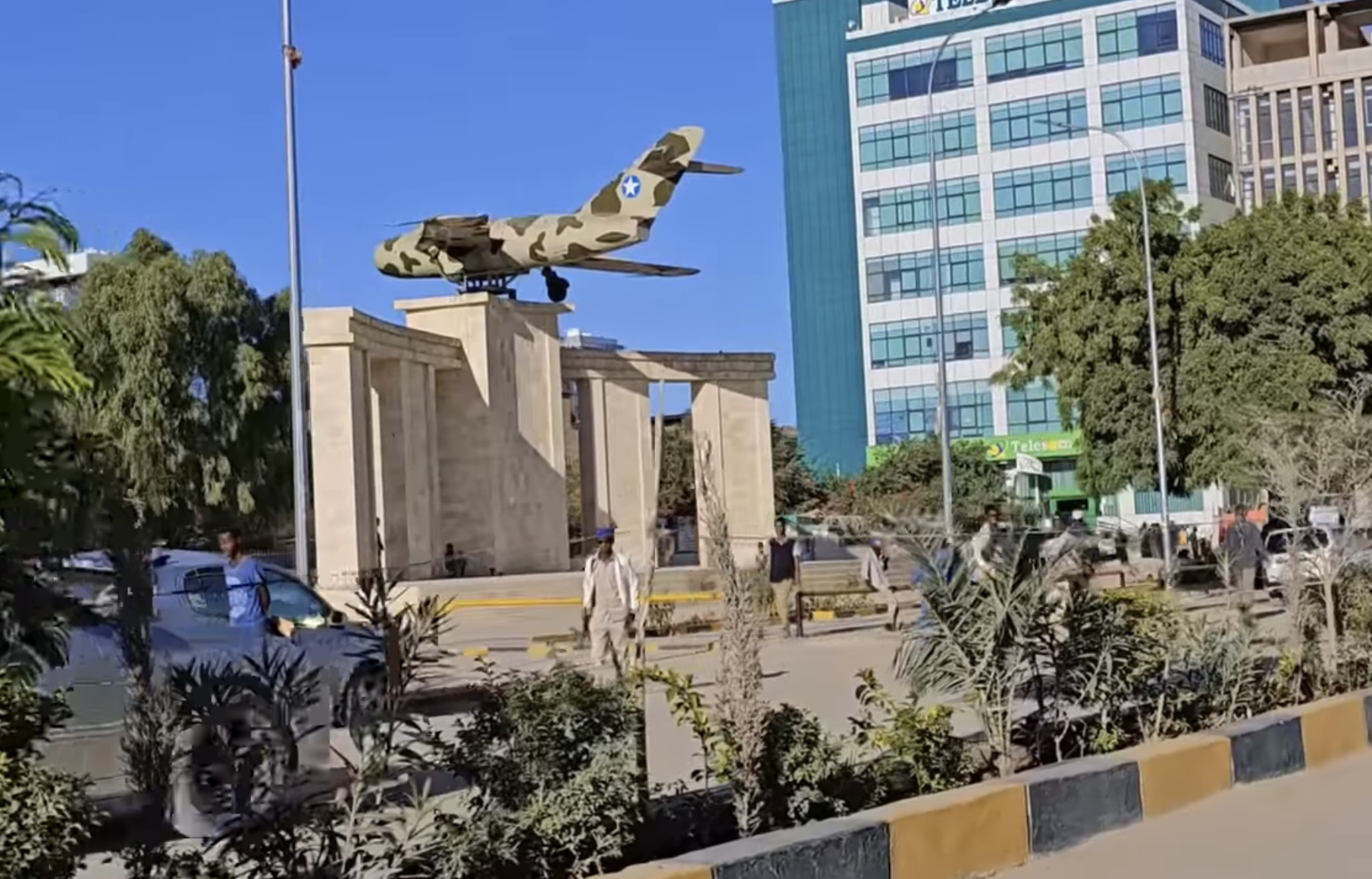
- A newly rebuilt Hargeisa War Memorial
- Interactive map of Hargeisa War Memorial
- Location: Freedom Square, Independence Avenue, Hargeisa, Somaliland
- Coordinates: 9.5615°N 44.0653°E
- Type: Monument
- Dedicated to: Victims of the indiscriminate aerial bombardment of the city, part of the Isaaq genocide conducted by the Somali dictator Siad Barre

The Hargeisa War Memorial (Arabic: النصب التذكاري لحرب هرجيسا) is a monument in Hargeisa, the capital of Somaliland. The memorial was set up to commemorate the Somaliland War of Independence, and is a symbol of struggle for the people of Somaliland.

== Description and history ==
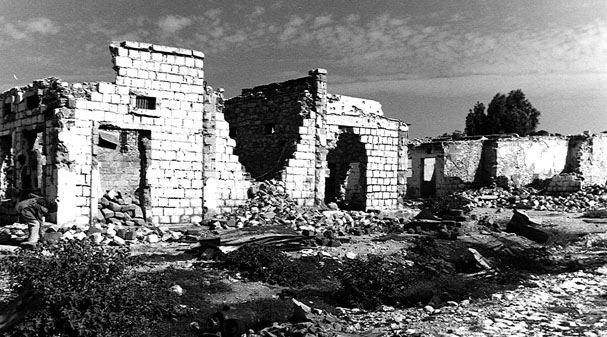
War-damaged houses in Hargeysa, a major city in Somaliland, 1991.

Artillery shelling of Hargeisa started on the third day of the fighting in late May 1988, and was accompanied by large-scale aerial bombing of the city carried out by the Somali Air Force (SAF) aircraft, which "took off from the Hargeisa airport and then turned around to make repeated bombing runs on the city."

The scale of destruction was unprecedented, up to 90 percent of the city (then the second largest city in Somalia) was destroyed, (United States embassy estimated 70 percent of the city was damaged or destroyed). The testimony of Aryeh Neier, the co-founder of Human Rights Watch, confirms the large-scale nature of government attacks against civilians:

In an attempt to dislodge the SNM, the government is using artillery and air bombardment, especially Hargeisa and Buroa, on a daily basis, aiming particularly at civilian population targets. Reports from eye witnesses speak of the town of Hargeisa as mere rubble, devastated to the point that it is barely recognizable even to its inhabitants.

The Guardian reported the scale of destruction as follows:

The civil war left Hargeisa in ruins: 80 percent of the building in the town were destroyed, many of them by the aerial bombardment of General Siad Barre's Zimbabwean mercenary pilots. The view from the air is of a town without roofs. The exposed pale green and blue plaster walls reflect the sunlight.

Many of the houses are boarded up because of the small anti-personnel mines scattered by Gen Siad Barre's forces when tens of thousands of Hargeisa residents fled. What was not destroyed was looted.

Other descriptions of what took place in Hargeisa include:

Siad Barre focused his wrath (and American-supported military might) against his Northern opposition. Hargeisa, Somalia's second city and the former capital of British Somaliland was bombed, strafed and rocketed. Some 50,000 people are believed to have lost their lives there as a result of summary executions, aerial bombardments and ground attacks. The city itself was destroyed. Streams of refugees fleeing the devastation were not spared by government planes. The term "genocide" came to be used more and more frequently by human rights observers.

Amnesty International confirmed the large-scale targeting and killing of civilian population by Somali government troops. The campaign had completely destroyed Hargeisa, causing its population of 500,000 to flee across the border and the city was "reduced to a ghost town with 14,000 buildings destroyed and a further 12,000 heavily damaged." The Congressional General Accounting Office team noted the extent to which residential districts were especially targeted by the army:

Hargeisa, the second largest city in Somalia, has suffered extensive damage from artillery and aerial shelling. The most extensive damage appeared to be in the residential areas where the concentration of civilians was highest, in the marketplace, and in public buildings in the downtown area. The U.S. Embassy estimated that 70 percent of the city has been damaged or destroyed. Our rough visual inspection confirms this estimate.

Much of Hargeisa appears to be a "ghost town," and many homes and building are virtually empty. Extensive looting has taken place even though the military has controlled the city since late July 1988. We were told that private property was taken from homes by the military in Hargeisa. Homes are devoid of doors, window frames, appliances, clothes, and furniture. The looting has resulted in the opening of what are called "Hargeisa markets" throughout the region, including Mogadishu and Ethiopia, where former residents have spotted their possessions. One observer remarked that Hargeisa is being dismantled piece by piece. We were told that long lines of trucks heavily laden with Hargeisa goods could be seen leaving the city, heading south towards Mogadishu after the heavy fighting had stopped.

The Governor of Hargeisa estimates the present population to be around 70,000, down from a pre-conflict population figure of 370,000. However, the current residents of Hargeisa are not believed to be the former Issak residents. Observers believe that Hargeisa is now composed largely of dependents of the military, which has a substantial, visible presence in Hargeisa, a significant number of Ogadeni refugees, and squatters who are using the properties of those who fled.

The report also stated that the city was without electricity or a functioning water system, and that the Somali government was "actively soliciting multilateral and bilateral donors for reconstruction assistance" of cities primarily destroyed by the government's own forces.

The memorial is located in Hargeisa's Freedom Square. It consists of a MiG-17 fighter aircraft of the Somali Air Force, which crashed nearby. The fresco underneath shows a woman holding the flag of Somaliland looking towards the sky in hope.

== Rebuilt 2020 ==
In 2020, Hargeisa war memorial monument at the center of the city will be rebuilt to a more appealing standard and architecture.

== Gallery ==
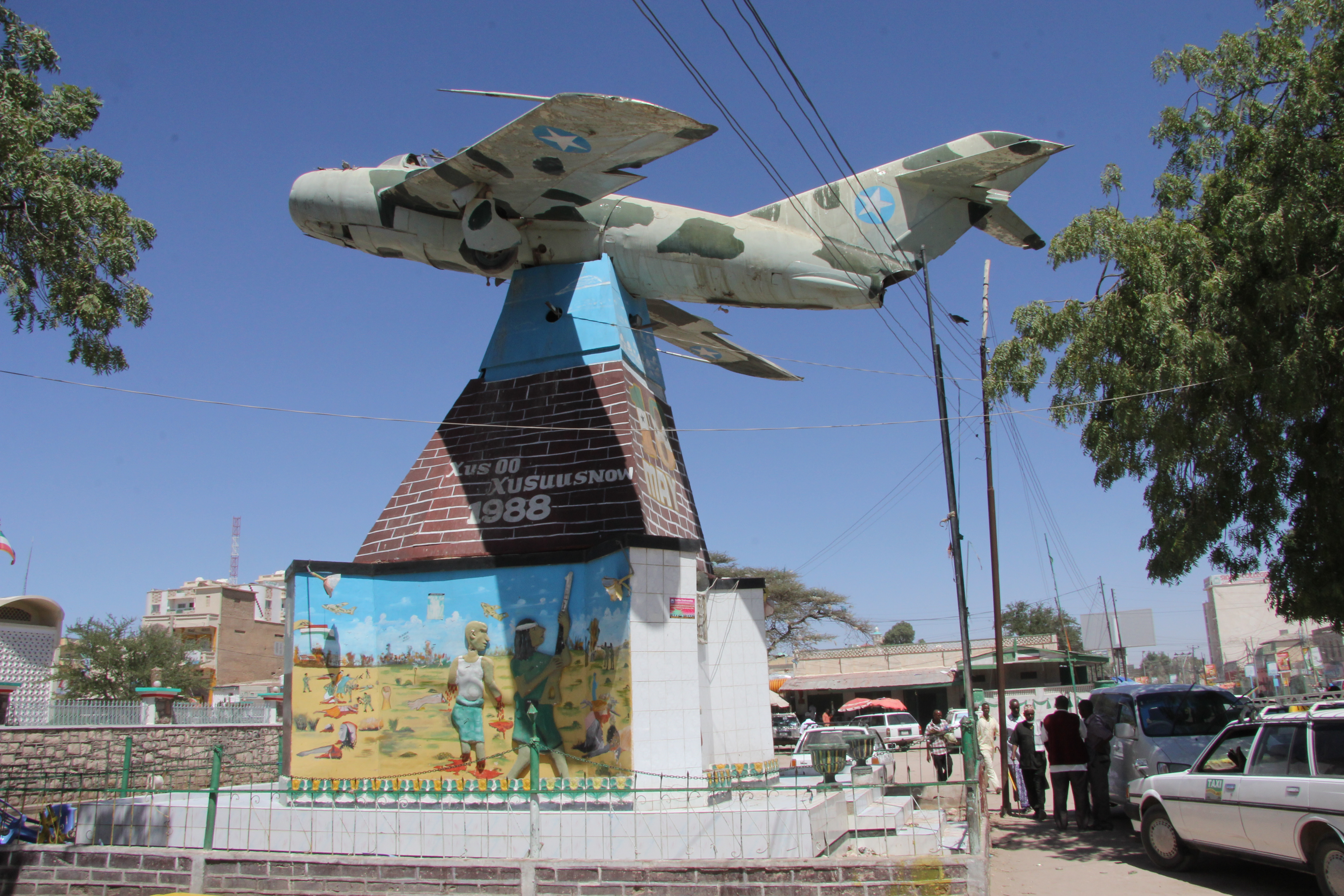
Old Hargeisa War Memorial

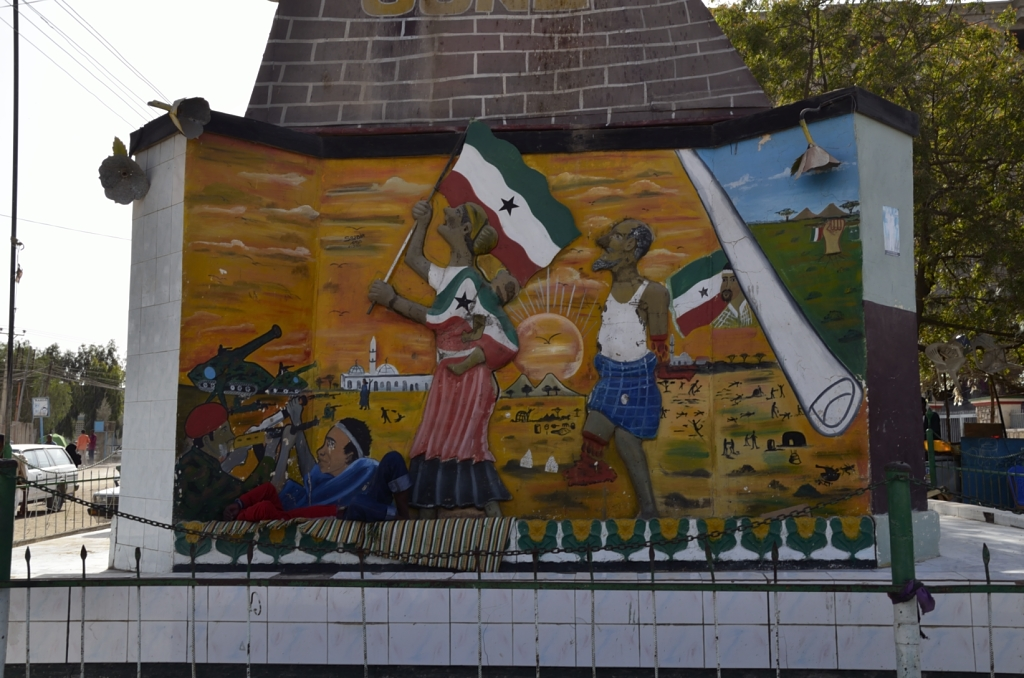
Mural

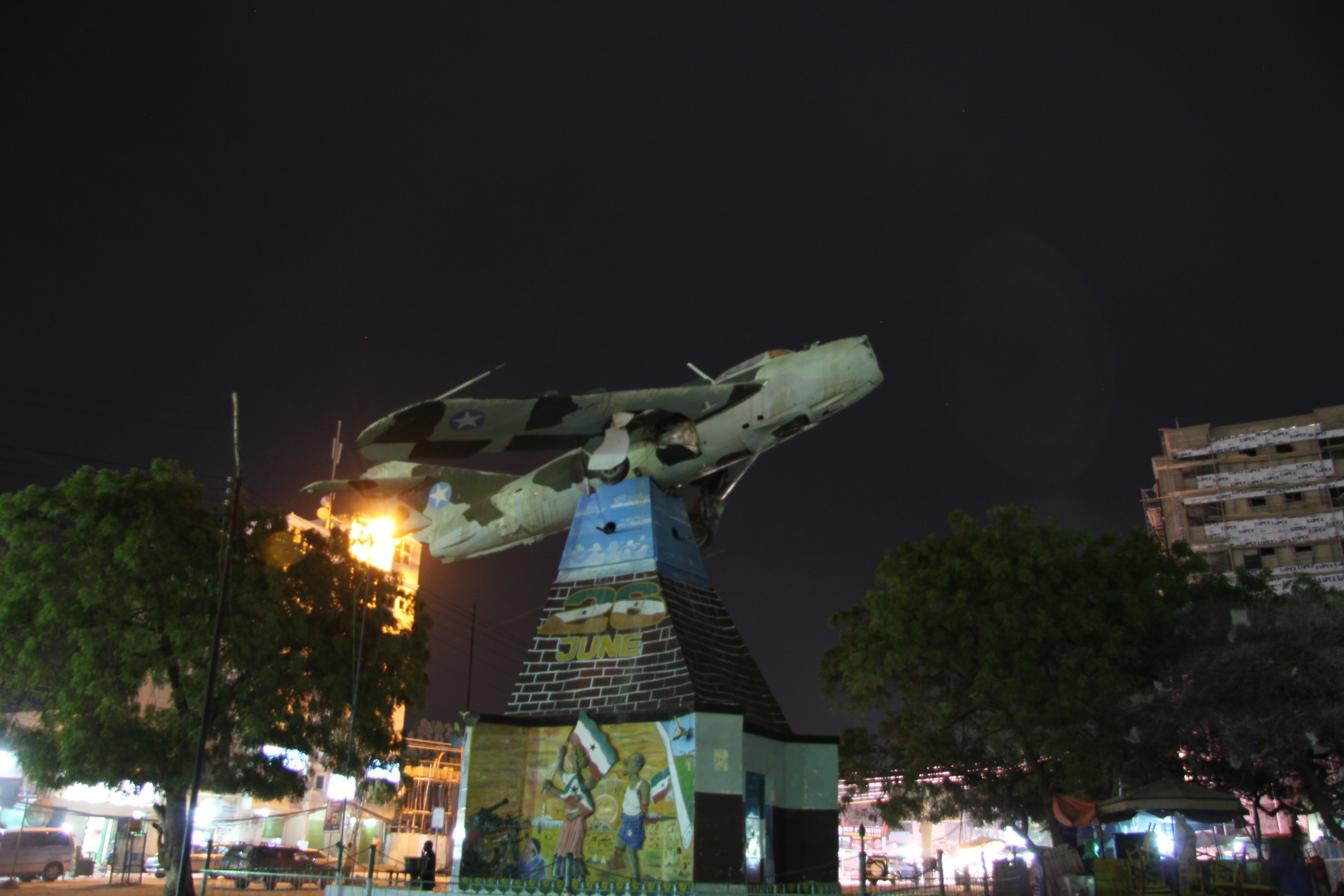
At night

== See also ==
- Burundian genocides
- Factions in the Somali Civil War
- Genocides in History
- Isaaq genocide
- Rwandan genocide
- Somali Civil War
- War in Somalia (2006–2009)
- Somali Civil War (2009–present)
- Somali Rebellion
- War in Darfur
