= Mandera Prison =

High security prison in Somaliland

- Location in Somaliland
- Location: Mandera, Somaliland; 09°54′43″N 44°42′42″E
- Status: Operational
- Security class: High-security
- Capacity: Around 765 (2010 est.)
- Opened: Unknown, between 1884 and 1 November 1949

Mandera Prison, also sometimes spelled as Mandhera or Mandheera Prison, is an isolated, high-security central prison located in the town of Mandera in the Maroodi Jeex Region of the self-proclaimed nation of Somaliland, about 95 km (59 mi) northeast of the capital Hargeisa. The prison has been in operation since Somaliland was still a British protectorate, and to this day functions as a major prison within the region.

There is a generally poor reception of the prison from those who have been inside in recent years, specifically guards mistreating inmates in some instances, and the deteriorating state of the building itself after years of continuous use. Furthermore, the prison in recent decades has grown to hold a disproportionate number of juvenile prisoners for minor crimes. Both domestic and foreign observers have condemned the prison for detaining journalists and non-ruling party politicians en masse, and for allowing executions.

== History ==
The exact date, when Mandera Prison was built or became operational, is unknown. Its earliest records show that it was constructed by the British Empire, as the main central prison for British Somaliland, sometime during the occupation of the region beginning in 1884. It was the only prison in the protectorate equipped to hold "all long-term prisoners" before the formation of the Somaliland Prison Service (modern day Somaliland Custodial Corps) on 1 November 1949. The detailed 1953 Prison Rules which reformatted the prison systems in the protectorate kept Mandera Prison as the main central prison. Mandera would continue to remain an important central prison throughout the rule of the following Somali Republic until 1969, and the Somali Democratic Republic until 1991, which both united Somaliland with Somalia. The larger prisons of Somalia at this time outclassed Mandera Prison, making it no longer the largest or highest security prison during the unions.

=== Somali National Movement attacks ===
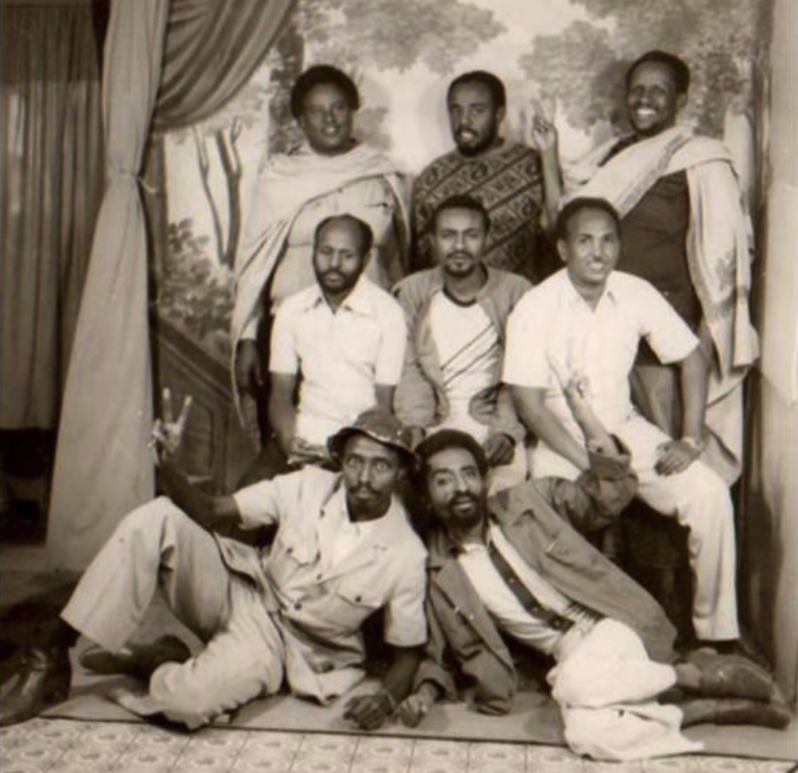
Inmates freed from the prison by the Somali National Movement in 1983

When the prison came under the control of the following Marxist-Leninist Somali Democratic Republic, it began to hold increasing numbers of political prisoners and those who opposed the government, including those seeking the re-independence of Somaliland. Two successful attacks, overseen by the anti-communist Somali National Movement (SNM), were conducted in January 1983 and May 1988. In both instances all prisoners, numbering in the hundreds and including dozens of political prisoners, were released.

==== 1983 attack ====
The first attack, which took place on 2 January 1983, was also the SNM's first military operation against the Somali Democratic government. With assistance from Isaaq military officers in the government, a commando SNM unit's deep infiltration into the nation from a makeshift base in Ethiopia caught the Somali National Army off guard, and saw the prison temporarily fall under the SNM's control. The SNM released all 744 of the prisoners detained at Mandera Prison, where they were told the following by Colonel Mohamed Hashi Lihle:

O prisoners, you are from everywhere. Now we will release you. You have three options to choose from: (1) whoever wants to join the SNM, as we are fighting the regime, you can come and join the Jihad; (2) whoever wants to go and join his family, we will help you get back home; (3) whoever wants to join the regime, you should know we pushed them back to Abdaal when we came; so go to them and we will not do anything to you until you reach them. But be careful: we might attack you later and then our bullets will hurt you. So choose one of these options.

— Mohamed Hashi Lihle

The speech not only motivated many of the Somalis in the prison to join the SNM, but became a major symbol of propaganda in the media across the Somali Democratic Republic, bringing attention to the otherwise politically isolated movement within the nation.

==== 1988 attack ====
The second attack, which took place at the dawn of 29 May 1988, was part of the SNM's successful 1988 Hargeisa-Burao offensive. The attack on the prison, which was not originally planned to take place, became necessary after reasonable fear arose that Somali forces would kill the prisoners detained there in retaliation for the SNM's recent successful capture of Adadley. After marching from Adadley through the night of 28 May, SNM forces arrived at dawn at the prison, where they were met with fierce resistance from the defending Somali forces, killing 10 SNM fighters and wounding more. A M40 recoilless rifle was eventually able to penetrate a hole at a weak point of the prison, where the SNM could enter. After the SNM's entrance, the prison's commander, who refused to surrender, was shot on sight, and all 664 inmates of the prison were freed. Among the freed were 34 Ethiopians, Southern Somalis, and former mayor of Hargeisa Barre Langadhe. A vehicle was provided to the former Ethiopian prisoners to transport them back to Jijiga, and the remaining prisoners who wanted to join the SNM were armed. Shortly afterwards, the SNM regrouped and returned to Adadley.

== Prison facility ==
The prison's location behind a thick white perimeter wall deep in the desert of Maroodi Jeex makes it very isolated, with the town the prison is located in, Mandera, being inhabited primarily by the prison guards and their family. Many of the basic components of the facility too such as the number of cells or the prison's maximum capacity nowadays are not known, or have not been explicitly documented. Reports by the Colonial Office suggest the prison had a capacity of around 400 nearing the end of British rule in 1959, but was regarded as being able to hold around 750 inmates in 1983, and around 765 inmates in 2010. With respect to the state of the prison itself, an August 2007 report by Amnesty International regarded the prison as having poor living conditions. This was later supported by a February 2011 assessment of the prison by the United Nations Office on Drugs and Crime, where the interior of the compound was deemed in need of refurbishment after years of consistent operation. Some former prisoners have also recalled poor bug-treatment at the compound, leading to scarring from repeated insect bites in some instances. Insect bites in the past have not been treated properly by the prison's medical department. Along with reports of abuse against detainees at the nearby police station, the prison complex as a whole has gained an overall poor reputation regarding its quality and treatment of inmates.

=== Police station and academy ===
Mandera Prison is located alongside the first police academy in Somaliland. Positioned separately across from the prison itself, construction of the academy and station began in 1968, and was finished in the late 1960s or early 1970s. The finished buildings were designed to house, feed, and provide basic training for new prison guards and police officers who would gain experience by working at the prison. In modern times; the buildings have on multiple occasions been used to hold detainees awaiting trial, who if found guilty, can quickly be sent to the prison proper. Reports of abuse have surfaced from some detainees who have spent extended periods of time being held at the station.

=== Prison education programs ===
During British colonial rule in 1951, Mandera Prison began hosting a prison education program which focused on teaching practical skills; including basketry, blacksmithing, building, carpentry, gardening, tailoring, and poultry farming. Juvenile inmates in addition were also given literary lessons, all of which was supervised and administered by two teachers assigned to the prison. This education was offered to willing inmates for a dual purpose: of giving them a paying profession to prevent poverty and recidivism, and of transferring any profits from the farms and shops to British government departments. In 1955 however, the prison education program was terminated "on the grounds that the statistical figures did not reveal any real need for a separate [education] institution." Despite this, an education program still existed at the prison in some capacity afterwards, as at least juvenile inmates were given "two hours of schooling daily" and were "required to work in the fields."

Some form of a prison education system still exists today, with the International Committee of the Red Cross (ICRC) sponsoring program since at least 2014. Whether some of the programs from British rule are still in operation is unknown; because only the teaching of carpentry, welding, and tailoring skills were discussed by the ICRC in a 2016 report. Between Mandera Prison and Puntland's Bosaso Prison, the program regularly serves 180 inmates.

== Controversies ==
=== Mass juvenile detention ===
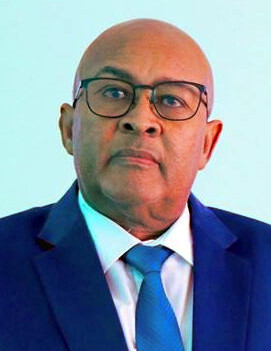
Abdirahman Mohamed Abdullahi, who confirmed the disproportionate juvenile detention rates in a 2022 visit

The prison in recent history has gained a reputation for holding inmates, especially juveniles, for long sentences that often do not match the severity of the crimes committed. This has led to a growing reliance on paralegals to secure the legal rights of inmates in the prison to an acceleration of their passage through the lengthy criminal justice system. This was not always the case though, as findings from a survey taken between 1948 and 1950 showed the juvenile population in Mandera Prison, and Somaliland's prisons as a whole, decreasing. The reverse has taken place recently, with multiple instances of one- to two-year prison sentences being documented for juveniles convicted of the theft of mobile phones. While the prison's inmate population still consists primarily of murders and to a lesser extent pirates, the prison still holds a disproporinatly large amount underaged schoolchildren as inmates. This was confirmed by the Waddani opposition party leader Abdirahman Mohamed Abdullahi on a visit conducted on 24 November 2022, in which he described the situation as a "gross violation of the detainees' human and civil rights".

=== Journalist and politician detention ===
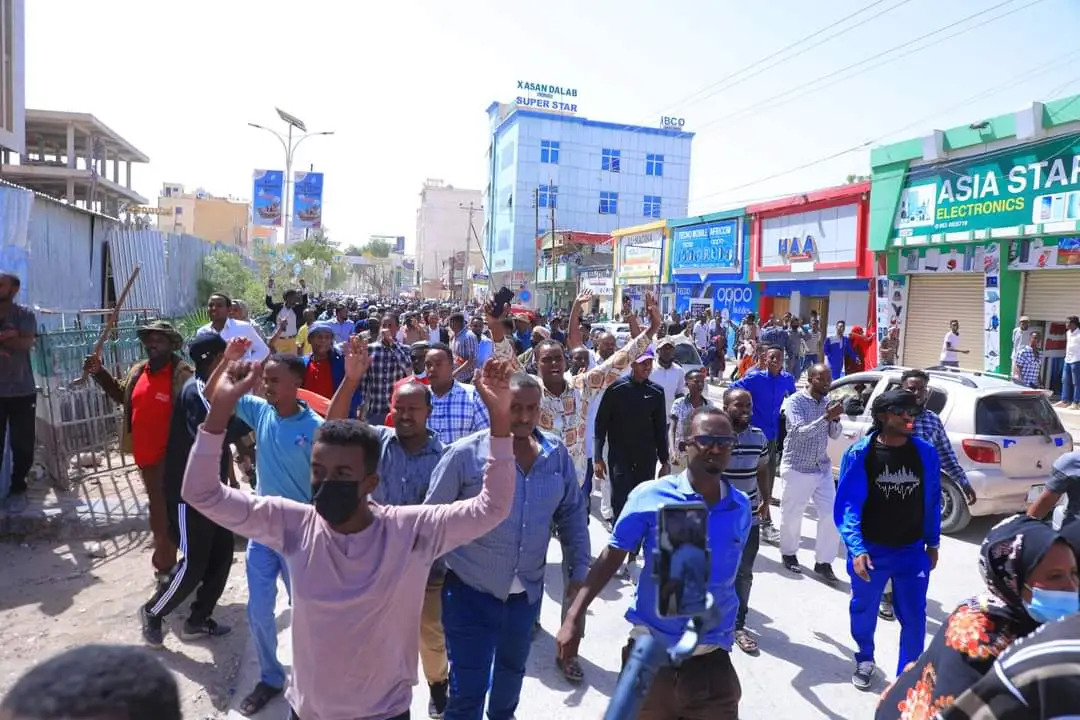
A protest taking place in the capital Hargeisa in 2022, whose coverage by journalists often leads to prison time.

The prison throughout its history has been used to hold journalists and politicians en masse whose reason for arrest is often only for reporting on unflattering crimes and protests in the nation, or for promoting the opposing parties' beliefs, calling into question the freedom of speech in Somaliland. During the Somaliland War of Independence; many journalists and politicians opposing the government at the time were sent to prisons across the nation, including Mandera Prison, where conditions were described as being very poor, with regular torture reportedly taking place for some inmates. The SNM in response issued requests to foreign governments, particularly France, and human rights groups to intervene to improve the situation of those detained, but it is unclear if any significant actions were made.

In modern times, mainly those in support of the opposing Waddani party or more broadly against the current government have been detained in the prison often without due process, and held for an indefinite amount of time. Instances of this occurring in recent years were seen on 9 June 2022, 15 August 2022, and 9 November 2022. Journalist detentions typically receive some form of condemnation and call for immediate release by at least one of the various journalists' rights groups that are active in the region. Such groups have had some success in the past.

=== Executions ===
On multiple occasions; the prison has been recorded as, and condemned for, executing some of its prisoners as recently as in 2022. On both 15 January 2020 and 26 November 2020, six prisoners convicted of murders were sentenced to death and executed by firing squad on the outskirts of the prison. On both occasions, the European Union released statements against the executions, restating their opposition to the irreversible form of capital punishment. Another execution by firing squad occurred on 16 February 2022 when four men convicted of the killing of soldiers were executed. These actions were again rebuked, this time by the United Kingdom, whose representative in Hargeisa responded by saying that execution "has no deterrent effect on crime".

== Notable inmates ==
Below is a list of notable inmates who have served time in Mandera Prison. The information on the table is organized in the order of the name of the detainee, the reason for their notability, the crime committed, the original sentencing for the crime, the year detained, and the year released if available.

Notable inmates of Mandera Prison
Name	Reason for notability	Crime charged	Original sentencing	Date detained	Date released	Ref(s).
Abdullahi Yusuf Ahmed	Future 6th President of Somalia and 1st President of Puntland	Prisoner of conscience to Barre's government	N/A	November 1969	October 1975	
Mohamed Farrah Aidid	Prominent Somali politician and general	Prisoner of conscience to Barre's government	N/A	November 1969	October 1975	
Ali Hassan Adan "Ali Banfas"	Prominent poet and teacher	Prisoner of conscience to Barre's government	N/A	1980	1988	
Barre Langadhe	Former Mayor of Hargeisa	Prisoner of conscience to Barre's government	N/A	N/A	29 May 1988	
Mohamed Abdi "Gabose"	Qaran party leader, former government minister, Somaliland's only neurologist	Seditious assembly	3 years, 9 months	19 August 2007	N/A	
Mohamed Hashi Elmi	Qaran party leader, former Mayor of Hargeisa, civil engineer	Seditious assembly	3 years, 9 months	19 August 2007	N/A	
Jamal Aideed Ibrahim	Qaran party leader, Telecommunicator businessman	Seditious assembly	3 years, 9 months	19 August 2007	N/A	
Osman Aw Mohamud "Buurmadow"	Traditional leader, localized peace mediator	Treason (Dropped) and Defamation imposed on a Hargeisa court	1 year	15 March 2012	17 July 2012	
Abshir Mohamed Duale	Sultan of Awdal	Mining dispute, unclear	N/A	15 December 2019	12 January 2020	
Mohamed Mohamud Yusuf	Waddani party chairman in the Sheikh District	Unclear	N/A	9 November 2022	N/A	
