= Somali National Movement =

Rebel groups in the Horn of Africa

- Leaders: Ahmed Mohamed Gulaid (1981–1982); Omar Elmi Dihood ( co-founder ) Yusuf Sheikh Ali Madar (1982–1983); Colonel Abdiqadir Kosar Abdi (1983–1984); Ahmed Mohamed Mohamoud (1984–1990); Abdirahman Ahmed Ali Tuur (1990–1991)
- Group: Isaaq
- Headquarters: London (1981–1982); Hargeisa (1989–1991)
- Active regions: Somaliland; Somalia
- Ideology: Anti-authoritarianism; Islamic democracy; Regionalism; Anti-communism; Factions: Isaaq interests
- Wars: Somali Civil War

The Somali National Movement (SNM; Somali: Dhaqdhaqaaqa Wadaniga Soomaaliyeed; Arabic: الحركة الوطنية الصومالية) was one of the first organised guerrilla and mujahideen groups that opposed the Siad Barre regime in the 1980s to the 1990s. The group was also the main anti-government faction during the Somaliland War of Independence. The organisation was founded in London, England, on April 6, 1981 by Hassan Isse Jama, Hassan Adan Wadadid, Ahmed Mohamed Gulaid, Omar Elmi Dihood and other former Somali diplomats, who stated initially the group's purpose was to overthrow the Siad Barre regime.

In May 1991, the group declared an independent Republic of Somaliland in the region that had constituted British Somaliland before independence and unification with the former colony of Italian Somaliland in 1960 after the Somaliland War of Independence.

== Formation ==
Formally established in 1981 by a group of Somali intellectuals and dissidents from Saudi Arabia and England that included Dr. Omar Elmi Dihoud and Ahmed Jimaale who were both based in the United Kingdom.

In 1980, the key leaders in the Saudi group determined that London provided a more favourable political climate for operating an international dissident group, therefore several people relocated to London to work full-time with the movement. The organisation was formally founded in Jeddah in April 1981 by an intellectual elite with the objective of overthrowing Barre's dictatorial regime.

=== Ideological splits ===
Internal ideological disagreements emerged during the formation, particularly between secular-oriented members and more religiously conservative factions based in Saudi Arabia. Contemporary accounts described Dihoud as openly Christian, while Jimaale was described to have secular and liberal outlooks to topics. Dihoud is said to have criticised the religious character of the organisation, arguing that the SNM should maintain a secular political direction rather than adopt a religious orientation.

I.M lewis interview with Dihoud:

"They did not like drinking and were far too religious for politicians.They wanted to form an Islamic movement, but the London group rejected this idea. In comparison with his Saudi colleagues, Ahmed Jimaali was more liberal and more secular."

Gérard Prunier also writes that the Ethiopian characterisation of the Somali National Movement as a ‘religious’ organisation was a fundamental misreading of the movement’s nature. To describe the SNM in such terms would have been to classify it as Islamist, which, Prunier argues, it was not.

=== Approaching Ethiopia ===
The SNM additionally sought foreign backing during its formative years. In 1981, members of the SNM approached Diplomat Said Abdullahi Egal, who maintained contacts with Ethiopian diplomatic officials in Sweden and was noted for his fluency in Amharic, in an attempt to establish communication with the government of Ethiopia. Initial requests for support were rejected. Subsequent contacts were later renewed when Mohamed Kahin and several SNM members crossed into Ethiopia seeking support from the government of Mengistu Haile Mariam. Ethiopian officials later established communication with SNM representatives based in London.

Colonel Moges, an intelligence officer under Mengistu Haile Mariam, facilitated meetings with fourteen senior SNM figures in Addis Ababa, offering Ethiopian backing in exchange for breaking for secession. Among the inducements offered was the prospect of ceding the Hawd region.

Emblem of the Somali National Movement

== Afraad ==
One of the major units of the Western Somali Liberation Front (WSLF) was the Fourth Brigade known as "Afraad" which was founded in Gabiley, composed of Habar Awal, Isaaq officers, businessmen and elites. Afraad's initial objective was to liberate Somalis living in Somali Region of Ethiopia, but its focus later shifted due to increasing abuses against Isaaq civilian population perpetrated by WSLF. Killing, looting and rape of civilians by WSLF was common from 1978 onwards. This abuse was due to the Somali state employing the Ogadeni subsection of WSLF as a subsidiary militia that would be used to maintain control over the northern regions of Somalia. I. M. Lewis contextualises the period in which Afraad was formed as follows:

The process of Daarood colonization of the north including seizure of property and economic favouritism at Isaaq expense, greatly intensified under Gani's brutal rule, with the systematic application of the apparatuses of state repression which increased in number and scope after the formation of the Isaaq-based Somali National Movement in April 1981

Armed clashes between Afraad and the Ogaden forces of WSLF began shortly after 1979. An Isaaq army officer arrested 14 leading WSLF fighters who have been harassing and abusing the local population at Gobyar.

From February 1982, Isaaq army officers and fighters from the Fourth Brigade started moving into Ethiopia where they formed the nucleus of what would later become the Somali National Movement.

== Funding ==
The task of financing the fight against the Barre regime proved a challenge as the SNM lacked a foreign sponsor. Additionally, the Somali regime imprisoned wealthy Isaaq merchants and traders to prevent them from financially supporting the organisation. Those who were not imprisoned were forced to report to an 'orientation centre' to prove they were still in town and be degraded. These centres were originally used for socialist propaganda teaching, however were then routinely used to track the movement of citizens in Northern Somalia by the intelligence services.

The SNM had to rely on the support of its Isaaq constituency for funds, which were primarily collected on a clan basis but wealthy businessmen also contributed. Among those wealthy businessmen was Abdillahi Omaar, a Somali newspaper owner and father of Raakiya Omaar, according to a 2009 obituary written by former Somaliland presidential advisor, Abdillahi Omaar served as a firm pillar of the SNM cause abroad, with Ahmed Silanyo later acknowledging his indispensable financial assistance at key moments.

Ahmed Arwo writes:

Xilligii halganka SNM waxuu ahaa tiir adag oo u fadhiya London, isagoo taakuleyn jiray Hoggaanka kasta oo SNM soo maray, sida uu sheegay Guddoomiyaha Kulmiye Axmed Siilanyo, oo qiray inuu meelo adag SNM cabdillahi Oomaar ka kaafiyey oo gurmadkiisu furdaamiyey.

Translation:

During the SNM struggle, he was a strong pillar in London, supporting every SNM leader, according to Kulmiye Chairman Ahmed Siilanyo, who admitted that he helped the SNM leader...... Abdillahi Oomaar helped us overcome difficult times and that his support opened the way.

The SNM's initial funding model worked in a similar fashion to 'diya' payments whereby each Isaaq clan resident in Saudi Arabia and the Gulf would collect a set amount from their communities. This decentralised funding model gave the organisation relative independence. Moreover, enhancing the organisation's accountability to its numerous supporters. Therefore, this financial autonomy provided more freedom to the organisation but is also thought to have strengthened the insurgency movement.

=== Revenue generation ===
The establishment of internal revenue sources was a crucial factor allowed the organisation to succeed and outperform its competitors. Therefore, facilitating the taxing of constituents themselves by commandeering one young man and one sheep from each household. As a result, encouraging entrepreneurialism but also containing it.

Therefore, these processes produced a negotiation between rulers and ruled in which the opinions of ordinary Isaaq kin mattered since they provided the resources to continue the fight.

==== Role of commercial intermediaries ====
Dahabshil which would later become one of Somaliland's largest money transfer and telecom firms started out as an SNM financier. As Isaaq financiers based in Dire Dawa (Ethiopia) used SNM radios to transfer money to fighters, this allowed them to also intervene in the organisation’s affairs.

Isaaq delegates received approximately $14–25 million in remittances which funded the supply arms of to the rural guerillas who helped overthrow the Barre regime.

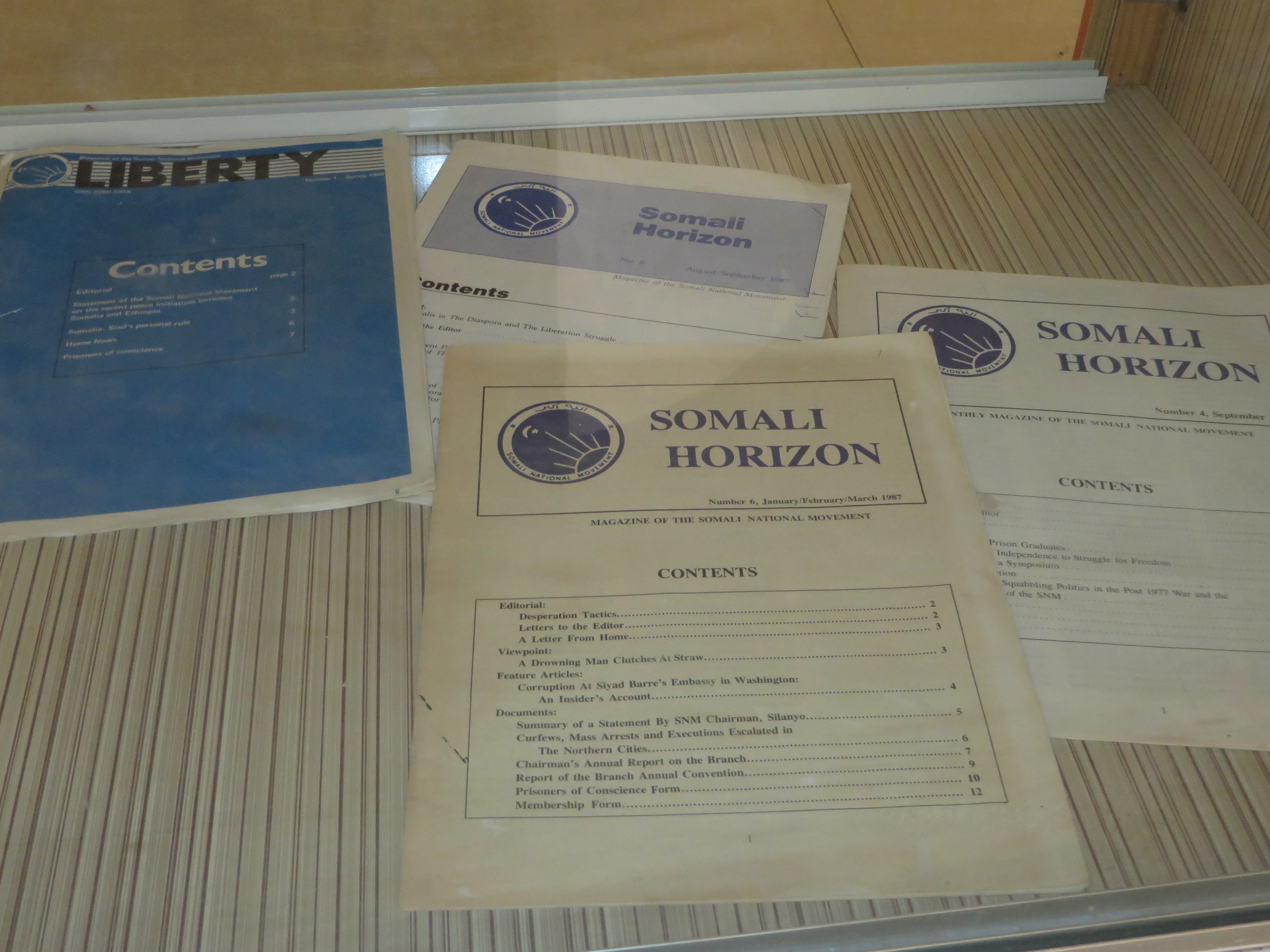
Copies of the Magazine of the Somali National Movement (SNM), 1987

== Publications ==
In the Summer of 1981, the organisation published a magazine called "Somalia Uncensored". This magazine aimed to spread the message of the SNM to expatriate communities across England and elsewhere. It was edited by Hassan Isse Jama who was a former BBC Somali Service broadcaster who was forced to relinquish his role at the BBC due to his SNM related activities. This publication was printed in London and was largely financed by the Saudi-Somali community. Moreover, it was published on a monthly basis between June and December 1981 whereby its final edition announced the formal transfer of the organisation's leadership to SNM members in Ethiopia. The SNM also published the bi-monthly magazine "Liberty".

== Role of women in the SNM ==
Women often played an "invisible role" in the organisation working predominantly as nurses and medics during the conflict. Additionally, since they were less likely to arouse suspicion compared to men they travelled more freely allowing them to establish clandestine communication channels which also benefited traders. One well known woman dubbed the "Somaliland Freedom Fighter" is Amina Mahamoud Suldan.

== Military operations ==
In 1982, the organisation moved its headquarters from London to Dire Dawa, Ethiopia where 3 key military bases were established. From here, it would launch guerrilla raids into the Maroodi Jeex and Togdheer regions. A growing number of northern civilian recruits and defectors from the Somali army, drawn almost exclusively from the Isaaq clan, were shaped into a guerrilla force and trained to produce a hard-core of disciplined fighters. Although the Ethiopians were said to have initially only supplied ammunition, Isaaq recruits came with their own arms in addition the equipment seized from the Somali army. Soon after, the Somali army established the "Isaaq Exterminator" command which aimed to ethnically cleanse the Isaaq population.

Over the following years, the SNM made numerous clandestine military incursions into northwest Somalia. Although these attacks never posed a direct threat to the regime's control of the area, such activities and the boldness and tenacity of its small force were a constant irritation to the Barre regime. Wounded SNM combatants were reportedly treated in Harar.

The first military offensive of the SNM took place near Baligubadle where a small force attacked a fuel tanker supplying the Somali regime's base in the town. According to Hassan Isse, 1985–86 was the most effective period of guerrilla warfare by the SNM against the Somali regime whereby its operations extended southwards with support from Dir clansmen which would later call themselves the "Southern SNM".

In the late 1980s, the National Security Service increased its activities against dissidents and SNM sympathisers. In response, the SNM carried out the assassination of the regional National Security Service Chief in 1986 which led to the newly appointed Northern military commander Mohammed Said Hersi Morgan in unleashing a new wave of terror against the Isaaq population as set out by his "Letter of Death".

However, in 1988 the situation rapidly changed when President Barre and Meningstu signed a peace accord where it was agreed that they would both cease hostilities towards one another and stop harbouring each other's dissident. As a result, forcing the SNM to relocate into Northern Somalia, a key event which drastically changed the trajectory of the conflict whereby its activities lead to an all out war that led to its victory.

=== The Regime's response to SNM activities ===
As the SNM grew in strength and number throughout the 1980s, the Barre became increasingly repressive in the North of the country and systematically targeted those from Isaaq communities who were deemed to be supportive of the SNM. The consequence of the crackdown was a dramatic increase in support of the SNM. As a result, a substantial number of men, soldiers, students, traders, and civil servants joined the exodus to SNM bases in Ethiopia. Nevertheless, this defiant show of resistance in the northwest was met with further subjugation from the regime.

A Human Rights Watch testimony before the United States Congress' Africa Subcommittee on 14 July 1988 stated that the actions of the Barre government have "created a level of violence unprecedented in scope and duration in Somalia". The testimony of Aryeh Neier (co-founder of HRW) explains the context in which the SNM was formed:

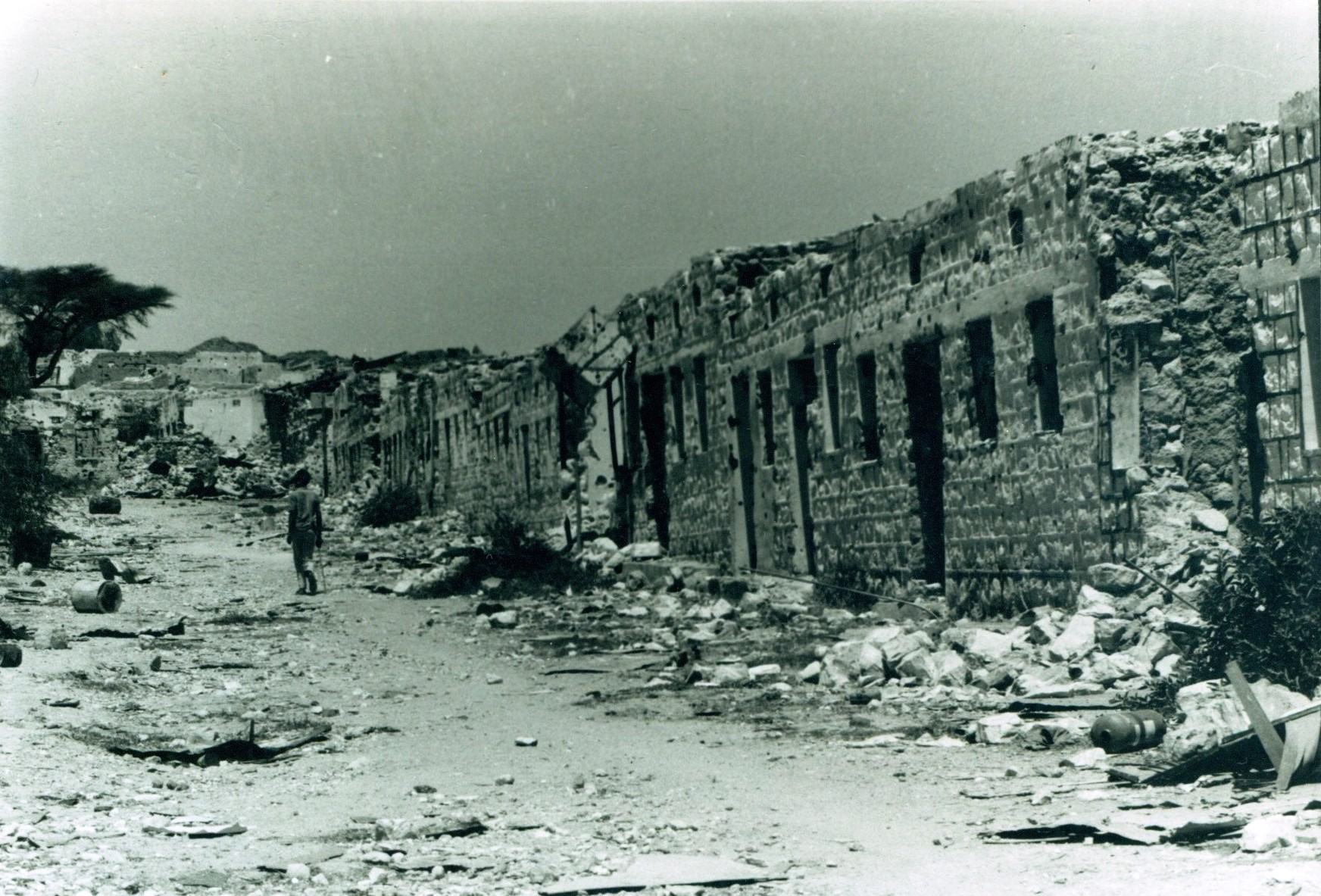
Up to 90% of Hargeisa (2nd largest city of the Somali Republic) was destroyed

Since 1981, with the formation of the SNM, northern Somalia has seen the worst atrocities. Serious human right violations, including extra-judicial executions of unarmed civilians, detentions without trial, unfair trials, torture, rape, looting and extortion, have been a prominent feature of life in the towns and countryside in the northern region since 1981. In order to deprive the SNM of a civilian base of support in their area of operation, those living in rural areas between Hargeisa and the Ethiopian border have suffered particularly brutal treatment. A scorched earth policy that involved the burning of farms, the killing of livestock, the destruction of water-storage tanks and the deliberate poisoning of wells, has been pursued actively by the military. The principal towns have been subjected to a curfew for several years; arbitrary restrictions on the extension of the curfew have facilitated extortion by soldiers and curfew patrols. Internal travel is controlled through military checkpoints .... The existence of the SNM has provided a pretext for President Barre and his military deputies in the north to wage a war against peaceful citizens and to enable them to consolidate their control of the country by terrorizing anyone who is suspected of not being wholeheartedly pro-government. Years of sustained state violence have created a serious level of political unrest in the region.

=== Mobilisation of Local Support ===
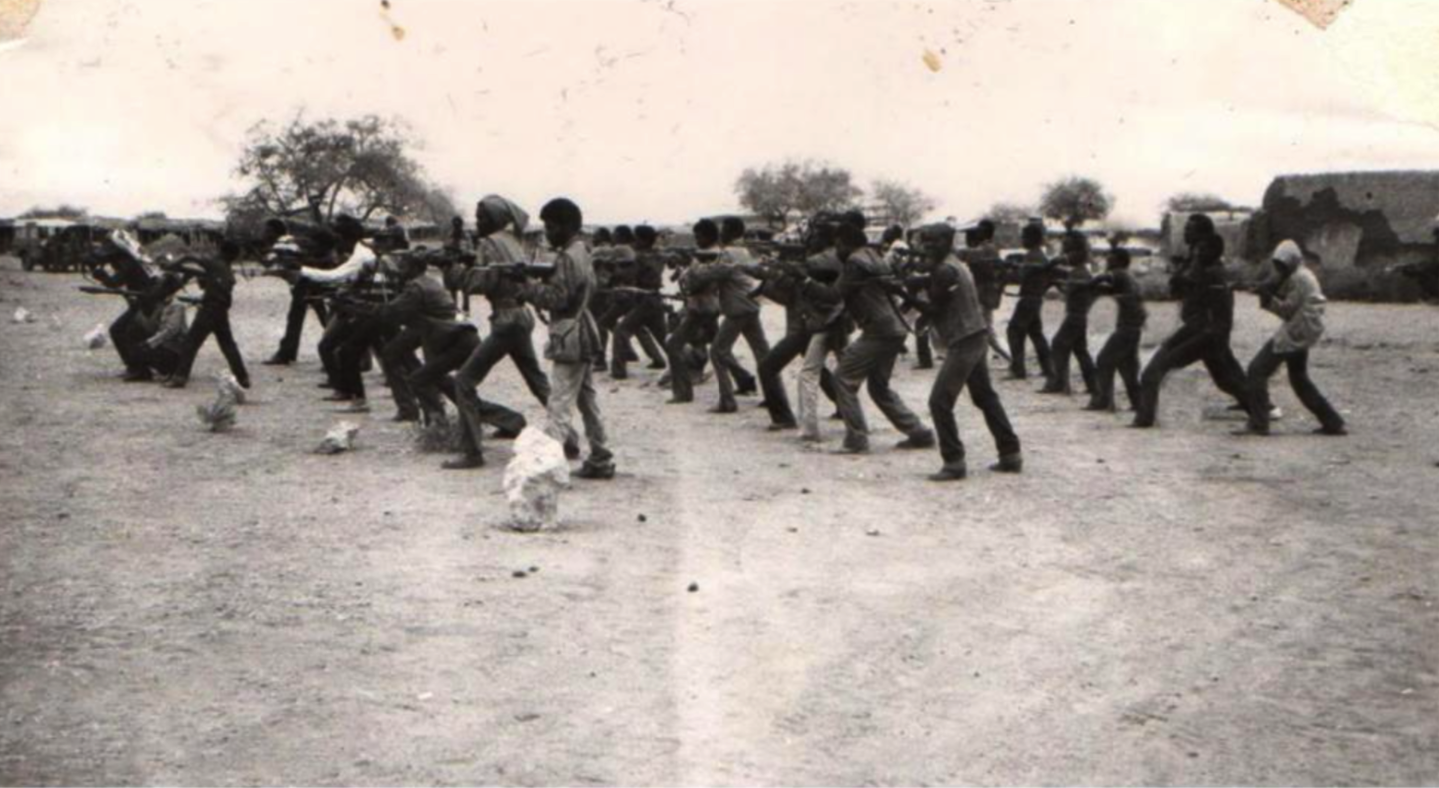
SNM volunteers in training in Aware, Ethiopia

Unlike other organised guerilla groups which were relatively independent from the non-combatant local population, the SNM established an extensive support network bringing together the diverse segments of the Isaaq population both at home and abroad. The mobilisation of solidarity and relationship building with diverse Isaaq clans was key to ensuring the upkeep of SNM combatants.

A system known as "Qaaraan" which aimed to transform social into economic capital was adopted whereby SNM members would seek support from their respective clans. This system was deeply ingrained in pastoral-nomadic ethics but also extended to urban dwellers. Therefore, acting as a form insurance to prevent the risk of minimise the risk of absolute pauperisation and poverty within clan families.

=== The Mandera Assault ===
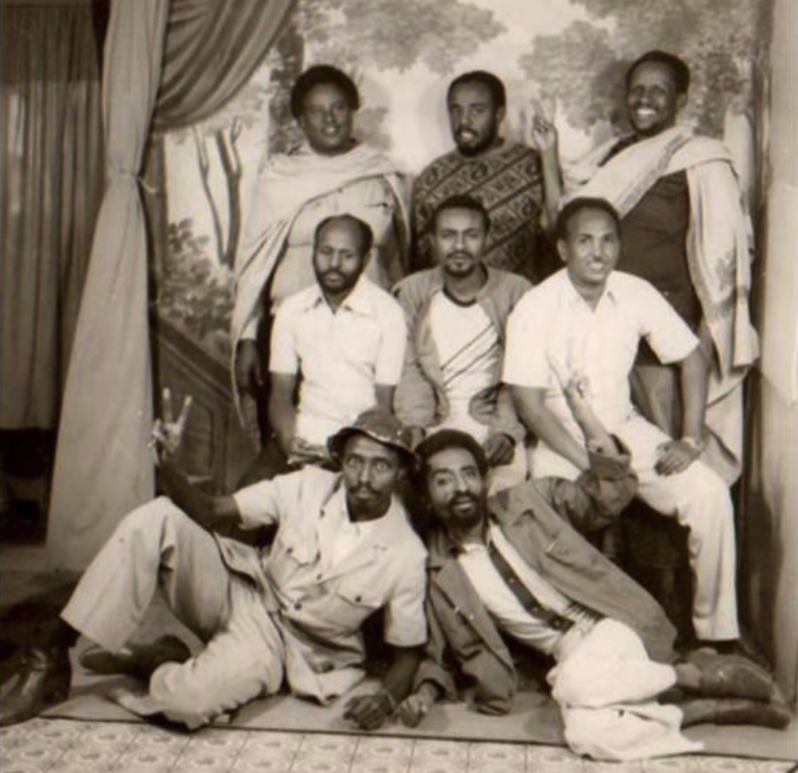
Northern dissidents freed from Mandera Prison by the SNM

On January 2, 1983, the SNM launched its first military operation against the Somali government. Operating from Ethiopian bases, commando units attacked Mandera Prison near Berbera and freed a group of northern dissidents. The assault liberated more than 700 political prisoners according to SNM reports; subsequent independent estimates indicated that approximately about a dozen government opponents escaped. Simultaneously, SNM commando units raided the Cadaadle armoury near Berbera and escaped with an undetermined amount of arms and ammunition. Directed by Colonel Mohamed Hashi Lihle, it was deemed to be the SNM's "most striking initial military success" and thought to of produced a more coherent and better organised opposition force.

=== Liberation of Hargeisa and Burao ===
Between the 27 and 31 May 1988, the SNM launched its main offensive on Somalia's second capital Hargeisa where it captured a large proportion of the city and fully took over Burao. In this pre-emptive strike, approximately 3000-5000 men from the SNM routed the Somali army from both cities. In Burao, the SNM led to the killing of many Somali military leaders and the confiscation of valuable military equipment. The Somali government responded by with a counterattack which led to over 10,000 Somali soldiers, SNM rebels and civilians being killed.

However, soon after the Somali army was able to regain control of both cities by the end of July. This was due to unprecedented levels of internal reinforces, the employment of non-Isaaq militias and Ogaden refugees. Moreover, external assistance to the Somali regime including mercenary pilots from South Africa and Libya in addition to economic and military aid from the UAE and Italy played a large role in recapturing the cities. Approximately, 50,000 people were killed between March 1988 and March 1989 as a result of the Somali Army's "savage assault" on the Isaaq population. Although this operation was not viewed as successful, it was seen as the death knell of Barre's regime and consequently a point of no return in Northern Somalia's (present day Somaliland) move towards independence. Furthermore, the Somali Army's indiscriminate aerial and artillery bombing of both cities led to the SNM becoming overwhelmed with volunteers. Additionally, Barre's response this operation was seen "as an attack on the whole of the Isaaq people" and led to the Isaaq uniting behind the SNM.

Elders across the Isaaq community took on a leading role to advance mass mobilisation efforts to rejuvenate decimated SNM numbers and capitalise on the enhanced support to organisation by Isaaq civilians. After meetings, it was decided that the Elders also known as the "Guurti" would become responsible for organising logistical support and recruiting new SNM combatants. Consequently, sub-clan affiliation became a key aspect of the military wing of the organisation and the "Guurti" became an integral part of the SNM's central committee after 1988. As a result of this increased support from the local population, the SNM was able to defeat the Somali army in the North-West of the country.

By June 1989, the SNM was actively mounting attacks on major hubs across the North-West, blockading transport routes and interfering with regime supplies to military garrisons.

Over the subsequent few years, the SNM would exert control of the vast majority of North-Western Somalia and expanded its operations to approximately 50 km East of Erigavo. Although it never gained full control of major cities including Hargeisa, Burao and Berbera but resorted to laying siege on them. In February 1991, the SNM succeeded in taking control of North-Western Somalia including Hargeisa and other regional capitals.

== Human rights abuses against refugees ==
In 1987, SNM insurgents abducted ten French aid workers from the Tug Wajale refugee camp, the hostages were held for two weeks before being released to Ethiopia. In 1988, before its attack on Burao, the SNM executed 71 non-Isaaqs and buried the victims in mass graves.

According to Robert Gersony’s field report, In 1988, prior to government intervention, the SNM attacked nine of the twelve UN-administered refugee camps in the region, killing more than 400 refugees. Gersony reported that 60 percent of those killed were children, about half of them below school age and the remainder between seven and fifteen years old.

Among the earliest and deadliest of these assaults were the attacks on the Agabar and Las Dhure refugee camps, where nearly half of those killed were women and children. Gersony reported that the refugees targeted in both camps were entirely unarmed. He further documented that SNM fighters forced children to march their deaths, where a number subsequently died of thirst.

Agabar camp alone held more than 40,000 Somali refugees at the time, including 13,773 children under the age of six and a further 13,000 children between six and fifteen; the adult population consisted of roughly 6,000 women and a number of elderly men.Much of the refugees had fled religious persecution under Mengistu Haile Mariam’s government in Ethiopia, in which Cuban personnel were reported to have collaborated; refugees described being forced to eat meat slaughtered by Christians in violation of Islamic dietary law, and reported that recitation of the Quran had been prohibited under Mengistu’s rule.

The CIA reported that the SNM decided in late August 1985 to shift its tactics from attacking Somali army camps and toward terrorist tactics. The SNM defended its actions against the refugee camps by alleging that the government was arming refugees, a claim that has been widely disputed. Gersony reports that there was no indication that refugees were armed prior to SNM attacks on camps.

"Refugee and other reports indicate that the refugees in Agabar and Las Dhure camps had not been armed for self-defense at any time before these attacks, nor had refugees from these camps played active roles in opposing the SNM offensive in the area, which had only begun within hours of these actions."

Staff of a U.S. Senate committee who examined the camps reported finding no evidence to support this: drawing parallels to refugee camps in the Kampuchea relief effort, which had served as guerrilla operational bases, the Somali camps did not appear to function in this way, and no military equipment was visible within them.

“The use of refugee camps as an operational base or supply depot for guerrillas has been a serious problem in the Kampuchea relief effort. The Somali refugee camps do not appear to serve as operational bases for the guerrillas. No military equipment was visible in the camps.”

A separate CIA intelligence assessment, however, found that Isaaq refugees had been actively harboring SNM fighters and supplying them with intelligence as early as 1984. Siad Barre resisted international pressure to resettle refugees within major urban areas, instead keeping the camps isolated from urban populations.

''Siad is portraying the refugee problem as larger than it is and is laying the blame on Ethiopia's door. He also wants to keep refugees isolated from the general population to avoid aggravating tribal and political conflicts that bedevil his regime.''

Gersony’s interviews with Isaaq refugees in Ethiopia lend some support to the CIA’s assessment of pre-existing ties between Isaaq refugees and the SNM. Of the 120 Isaaq refugees interviewed in one camp in Ethiopia, forty reported that immediate family members such as parents, spouses, children, or siblings were serving as SNM combatants, having joined the movement before the conflict intensified in May 1988.

The SNM were reported to have used refugee camps as means of recruitment and resupply and that the they were popular in Isaaq refugee camps. A separate report documents relatives of Isaaq refugees in Ethiopia had joined the SNM fighting in Hargeisa.

Abuses were not only limited to non Isaaqs, a BBC foreign correspondent reported that SNM rebels shelled the settlement of Arabsiyo in March 1990, killing several people and injuring 29.

== Democracy ==
In October 1981, Ahmed Mohamed Gulaid was elected as chairman of the organisation alongside Ahmed Ismail Abdi ‘Duksi’ as secretary-general. Additionally, an eight-member executive council was elected to oversee political and military activities. Reports state that the SNM was indisputably the most 'democratic' of all the fronts in Somalia, since it had five elected leaders since its creation, all of whom had served a full term in office, to be replaced by an elected successor.

The Central Committee was responsible for the vast majority of decisions and was responsible for organising regular congresses to elect the leadership. Throughout the organisation's period of activity, various clans were incorporated into the SNM. Additionally, leadership roles were awarded across clan spectrums although the Isaaq were the majority.

== Somaliland ==
=== The Northern Peace Process ===
After the SNM was able to exert control over North-Western Somalia, the organisation quickly opted for a cessation of hostilities and reconciliation with non-Isaaq communities. A peace conference occurred in Berbera between 15–21 February 1991 restore trust and confidence between Northern communities whereby the SNM leadership had talks with representatives from the Issa, Gadabursi, Dhulbahante and Warsangeli clans. This was especially the case since non-Isaaq communities were said to have been largely associated with Barre's regime and fought on opposing side of the Isaaq.

This conference laid the foundation for the "Grand Conference of the Northern Clans" which occurred in Burao between 27 April and 18 May 1991 which aimed to bring peace to Northern Somalia. After extensive consultations amongst clan representatives and the SNM leadership, it was agreed that Northern Somalia (formerly State of Somaliland) would revoke its voluntary union with the rest of Somalia to form the "Republic of Somaliland". Although there were hopes amongst of Northern communities for succession as early as 1961, the SNM did not have a clear policy on this matter from the onset. However, any nationalistic objectives amongst SNM members and supporters was abruptly altered in light of the genocide experienced under the Barre regime. As a result, strengthening the case for secession and reclamation of independence to the territory of State of Somaliland. Garad Cabdiqani Garaad Jama who led the Dhulbahante delegation was first to table the case for secession.

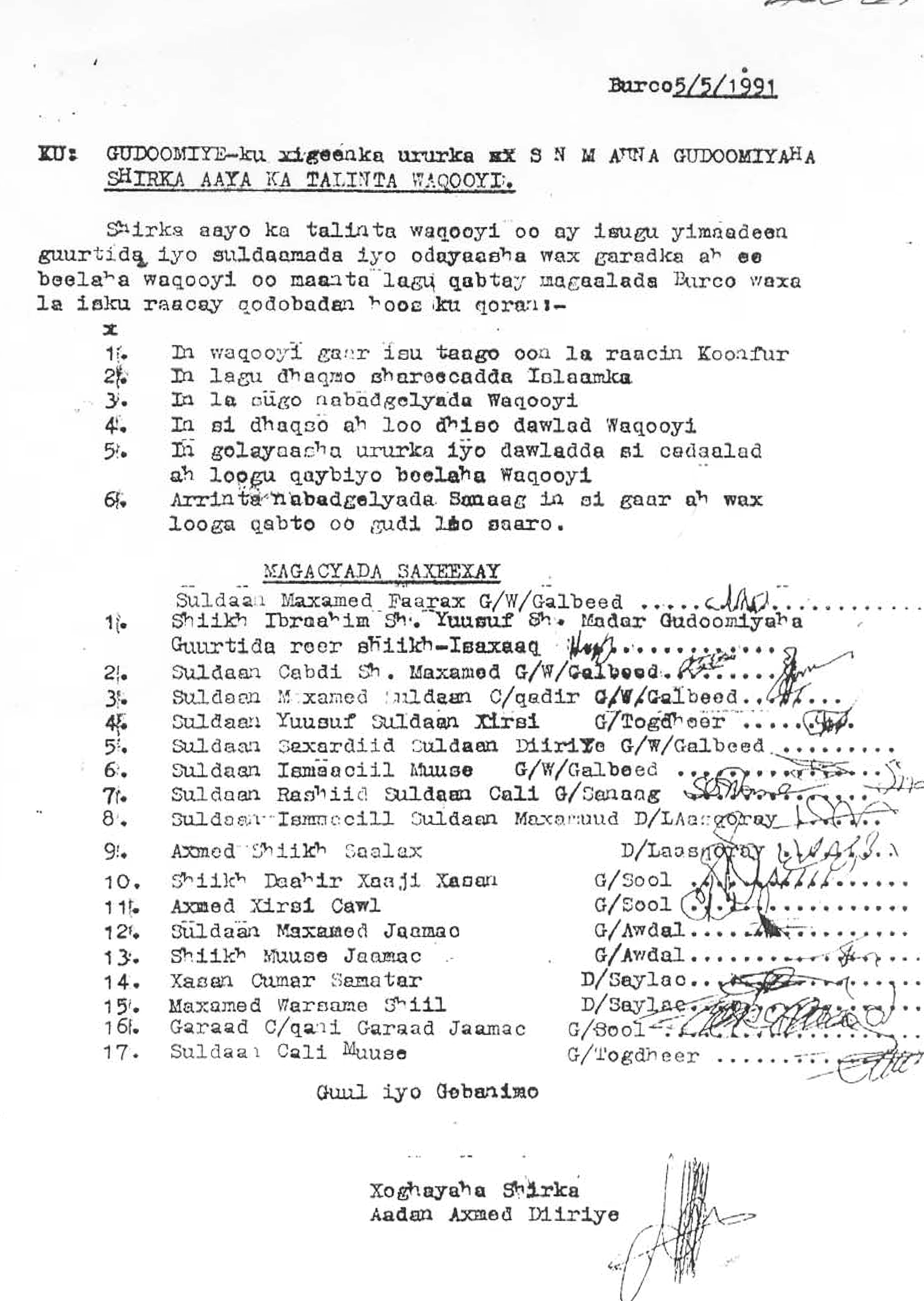
5 May resolution of the Burao grand conference. At the second national meeting on 18 May, the SNM Central Committee, with the support of a meeting of elders representing the major clans in the Northern Regions, declared the restoration of the Republic of Somaliland in the territory of the former British Somaliland protectorate and formed a government for the self-declared state.

=== The Declaration of Independence ===
In May 1991, the SNM announced the independence of "Somaliland" and the formation of an interim administration whereby Abdirahman Ahmed Ali Tuur was elected to govern for a period of two years. Many former SNM members were key in the formation of the government and constitution.

In May 1993 the "Borama Conference" took place to elect a new President and Vice President. The conference was attended by 150 elders from the Isaaq (88), Gadabursi (21), Dhulbahante (21), Warsengali (11) and Issa (9) communities and was endorsed by the SNM. As a result, the conference granted the government of Somaliland local legitimacy beyond the realms of the Isaaq dominated SNM, especially since the town of Borama was predominantly inhabited by the Gadabursi.

At this conference, the delegates agreed to establish an executive president and a bicameral legislature whereby Somaliland's second president Muhammad Haji Egal was elected. Egal would be reelected for a second term in 1997.
