= Somaliland War of Independence =

1981–1991 conflict part of Somali Civil War

- Part of the Somali Civil War, the Cold War and conflicts in the Horn of Africa and the Somali Rebellion
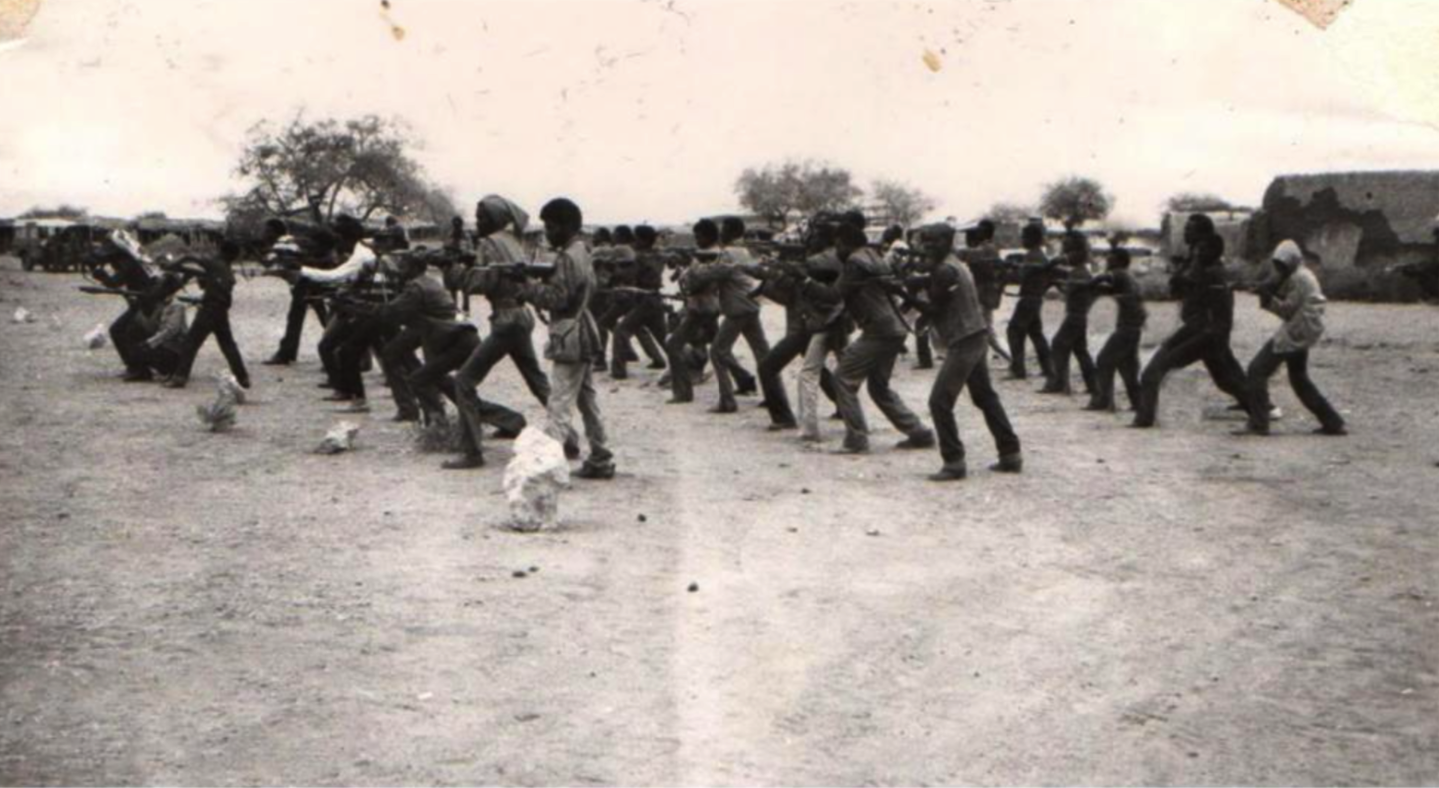
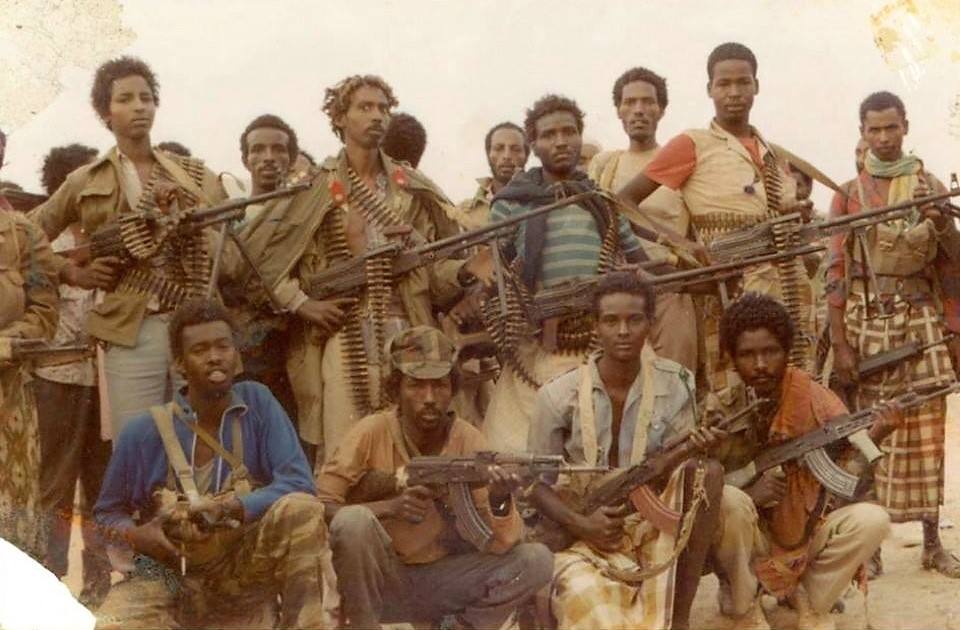
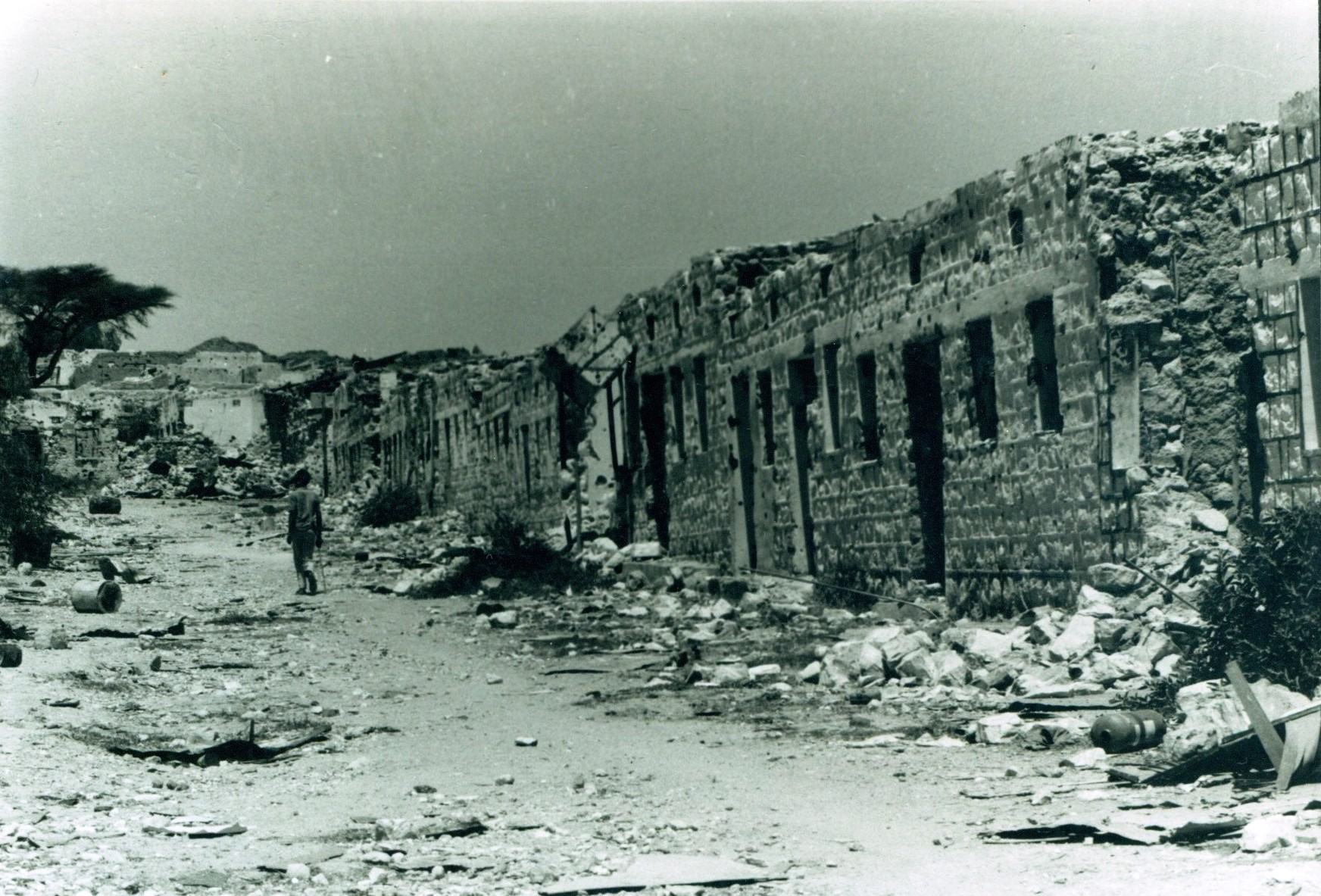
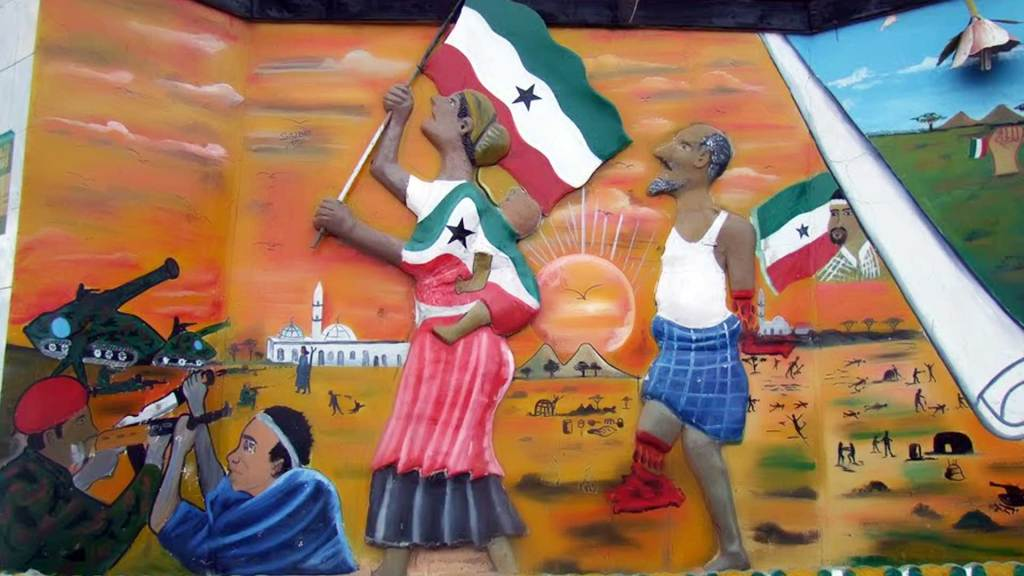
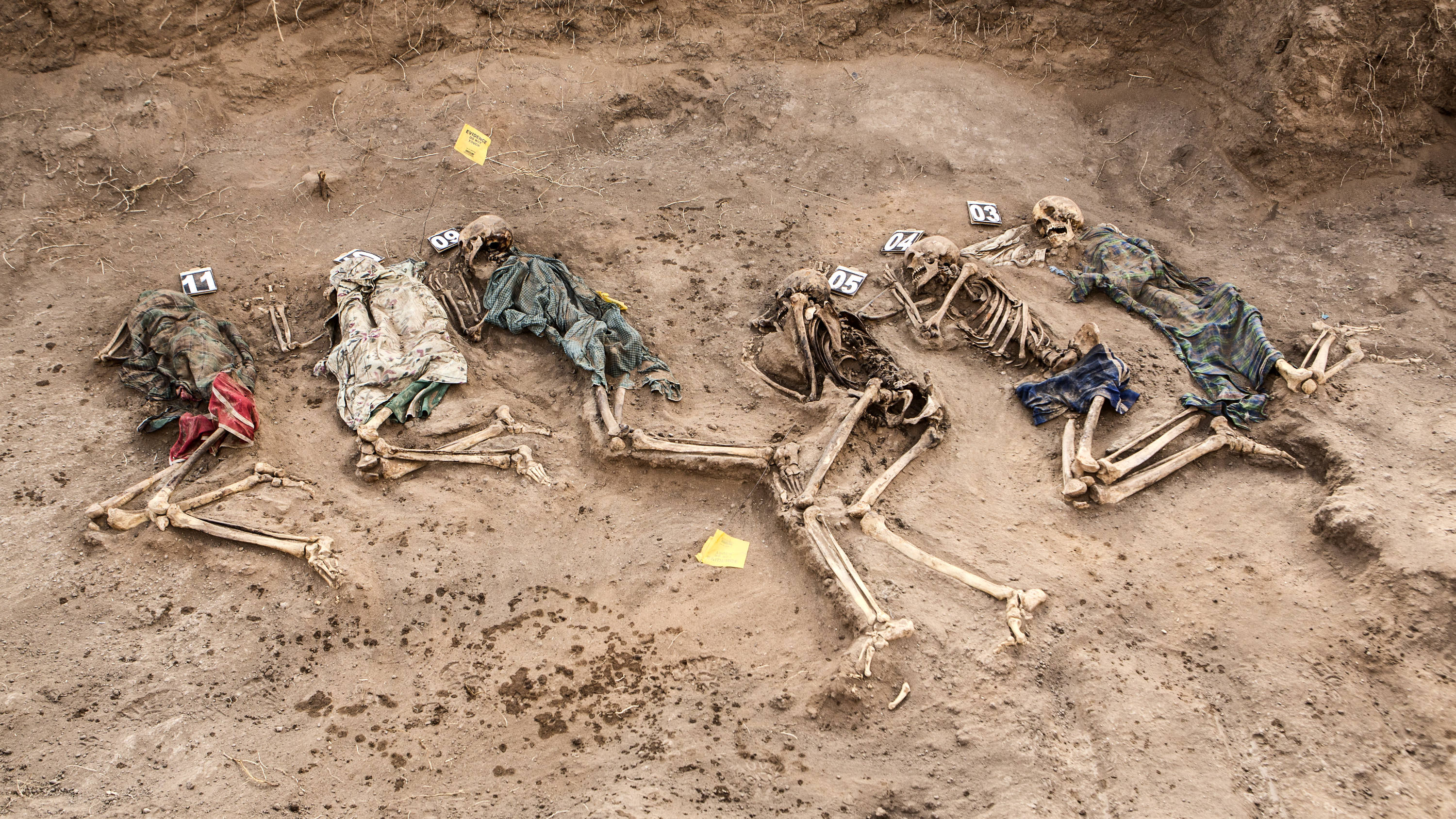
- From top to bottom, left to right: Military situation during the Somaliland War of Independence; Somali National Movement recruits training for combat in Aware, Ethiopia; SNM fighters in the Haud; Hargeisa in ruins after airstrikes; Hargeisa War Memorial; Exhumed skeletal remains of victims of the Isaaq genocide.
Date	6 April 1981 – 18 May 1991 (10 years, 1 months, and 12 days)
Location	Somaliland
Result	Somali National Movement victory: End of the Isaaq Genocide.; Grand Conference of the Northern Clans held in Burao ends major combat operations; Collapse of the Somali Democratic Republic; Collapse of the Western Somali Liberation Front; Creation of the Republic of Somaliland on 18 May 1991.; Beginning of the 1991 Zeila incursion
Territorial changes	Somaliland regains independence

Belligerents
Somalia; Somali Democratic Alliance; Western Somali Liberation Front; Djibouti (1991); United Somali Front; Supported by: Italy; United States (1981–1988); Saudi Arabia (History of Libya under Muammar Gaddafi) Libya (1988–1991); South Africa - (1984–1991)	Somali National Movement; Supported by: Ethiopia (1981–1987); South Yemen

Commanders and leaders
Siad Barre; Mohammed Said Hersi Morgan; Muhammad Ali Samatar; Mohammed Hashi Gani; Yusuf Abdi Ali "Tukeh” (Djibouti) Hassan Gouled Aptidon (Djibouti) Ismail Omar Guelleh (Djibouti) Abdirahman Dualeh Ali	Ahmed Mohamed Gulaid; Sheikh Yusuf Ali Sheikh Madar; Omar Elmi Dihood; Abdirahman Ahmed Ali; Suleiman Mohamoud Adan; Hassan Isse Jama; Ahmed Mohamed Mohamoud; Mohamed Hasan Abdullahi (Jidhif); Abdilahi Husein Iman Darawal; Mohamed Farah Dalmar Yusuf †; Mohamed Hashi Lihle †; Muse Bihi Abdi; Mohamed Kahin Ahmed; Abdiqadir Kosar Abdi †; Ibrahim Koodbuur; Abdullahi Askar; Ibrahim Dhagahweyne; Hassan Yonis Habane

Strength
60,000 (1987); Foreign mercenaries	3,000–4,000 (1982–1988); 50,000–70,000 civilians (1991)

Casualties and losses
Heavy	Heavy
- 50,000–100,000 due to the Isaaq Genocide; High estimates range between 100,000–200,000; Displaced: 500,000 refugees 400,000 internally displaced

The Somaliland War of Independence also known as the National Liberation Struggle in Somaliland (Somali: Halgankii Gobanimo-doonka, lit. 'The National Liberation Struggle'), the Northern Rebellion (Somali: Kacdoonkii Waqooyi, lit. 'The Northern Uprising') in Somalia, and sometimes called the Great Isaaq Uprising or the Isaaq Rebellion was an Isaaq rebellion waged by the Somali National Movement (SNM) against the ruling military junta in Somalia led by General Siad Barre lasting from its founding on 6 April 1981 and ended on 18 May 1991 when the SNM declared what was then northern Somalia independent as the Republic of Somaliland. The conflict served as the main theater of the larger Somali Rebellion that started in 1978. The conflict was in response to the harsh policies enacted by the Barre regime against the main clan family in Somaliland, the Isaaq, including a declaration of economic warfare on the clan-family. These harsh policies were put into effect shortly after the conclusion of the disastrous Ogaden War in 1978.

As a direct response to the harsh policies enacted by the Barre regime against the Isaaq people, in April 1981 a group of Isaaq businesspeople, students, former civil servants and former politicians founded the Somali National Movement in London. From February 1982, Isaaq army officers and fighters started moving into Ethiopia where they formed the nucleus of what would later become the armed wing of the SNM. Throughout the early to mid 1980s SNM launched a guerrilla war against the Barre regime through incursions and hit and run operations on army positions within Isaaq territories, especially into the Waqooyi Galbeed and Togdheer regions.

After the conclusion of a peace deal between Somalia's military junta and Ethiopia in April 1988 the SNM launched a major offensive in late May 1988, overrunning the cities of Hargeisa and Burao, then the second and third largest cities of Somalia. During the ongoing conflict, the Somali government's genocidal campaign against the Isaaq took place between May 1988 and March 1989, with explicit aims of handling the "Isaaq problem", Barre ordered the shelling and aerial bombardment of the major cities in the northwest and the systematic destruction of Isaaq dwellings, settlements and water points. The Siad Barre regime targeted civilian members of the Isaaq group specifically, especially in the cities of Hargeisa and Burao, and to that end employed the use of indiscriminate artillery shelling and aerial bombardment against civilian populations belonging to the Isaaq clan.

By early 1990, the Barre regime had lost control of large parts of the northern regions, and by its collapse in January 1991, the SNM succeeded in taking full control of northern Somalia including Hargeisa and other regional capitals, after which the organisation quickly opted for a cessation of hostilities and reconciliation with non-Isaaq communities, culminating in the "Grand Conference of the Northern Clans" in Burao between 27 April and 18 May 1991 and the subsequent formation of the Republic of Somaliland.

== Background ==
=== Postcolonial era ===
The first Somali state to be granted its independence from colonial powers was Somaliland, a former British protectorate that gained independence on 26 June 1960. The rest of what came to be known as the Somali Republic was under Italian rule under the title Trust Territory of Somaliland (also known as Somalia Italiana). Shortly after Somaliland gained independence, it was to form a union with its southern neighbour to create the Somali Republic. Henceforth British Somaliland was referred to as the northern (or north western) region of the Somali Republic, whilst the former Italian colonial state was referred to as the south.

Within British Somaliland the Isaaq constituted the majority group within the protectorate with Dir and Harti groups also having sizeable populations to the west and east of Isaaq respectively.

The union of the two states proved problematic early on when it was discovered that the two polities had been unified under different Acts of Union. The newly unified Somali Republic's parliament promptly created a new Act of Union for all of Somalia, but this new Act was widely rejected in the former State of Somaliland in a referendum held on 20 June 1961; with half of the population in the State of Somaliland (the north-west of nascent Somali Republic), the major cities of the former British protectorate voted against the ratification of the constitution – Hargeisa (72%), Berbera (69%), Burao (66%) and Erigavo (69%) – all returning negative votes. This was in contrast to the south (ex-Italian colony) which returned a strong support for the constitution (and four times the expected vote numbers in the south, indicating electoral fraud; an example of this is a small southern village called Wanlaweyn registered a yes vote higher than the 100,000 votes counted in all of the north). This was a major signal of discontent coming from the north only a year after forming the union. Northern support for the union consequently began to deteriorate as result of political and economic mismatches that were the result of two contrasting colonial experience that operated in the two parts of the unified republic. Another example of the simmering discontent in the north was a coup attempt by northern officers that was thwarted in 1961.

=== Coup attempt ===
Unrest and opposition to the union further increased as southern politicians began taking up the majority of political positions in the newly unified Somali Republic. This led to fears that the former State of Somaliland could become a neglected outpost. In turn, many northern administrative officials and officers were moved to the south to defuse regional tensions.

In addition to these tensions, there were also personal grievances among several officers of northern descent. They felt that officers from the south who had been appointed as their superiors following the unification were poorly educated and unfit as commanders. In addition, it was suspected that the government preferred Italian-trained officers from the south over British-trained officers from the north. A group of at least 24 (Note: One coup member was killed, and 23 others were later put on trial.) junior officers, including several who had been trained in Great Britain, eventually conspired to end the union between Somalia and Somaliland. One of the coup plotters was Hussein Ali Duale who later became a leading Somaliland separatist politician. The conspirators believed that they enjoyed the support of General Daud Abdulle Hirsi, head of the Somali National Army.

When the coup plotters launched their revolt in December 1961, they wanted to take over major towns in Somaliland. Researcher Ken Menkhaus argued that the coup attempt had "no chance of success" from the start, as the coup plotters did not enjoy majority support among the northern population or the local troops. One group of junior officer seized control of the radio station in Hargeisa, announcing their intentions and that they were supported by General Hirsi. Another group of coup plotters attempted arrest superior officers of southern origin in the town of Burao, but failed.

The government in Mogadishu was surprised at the revolt, but reacted quickly. General Hirsi declared via Radio Mogadishu that he was not involved in the revolt, whereupon non-commissioned officers of northern origin moved against the coup members in Hargeisa. The loyalists retook Radio Hargeisa, killing one coup member. The revolt was put down in a matter of hours. All surviving coup members were arrested.

Though the revolt had not been supported by the northern population, the locals still sympathized with the coup members. The government was thus inclined to opt for a lenient treatment. The conspirators were put on trial, and the British judge acquitted them, reasoning that there existed no legitimate Act of Union. In consequence, the officers could not be sentenced based on the Act, while the entire southern presence in the north became legally questionable. The ruling's wider implications was generally ignored in Somalia at the time, but later became important for northerners who wanted to justify the separation of Somaliland from Somalia. Regardless, the Somali government accepted the ruling and released the junior officers.

=== Social, political and economic marginalisation ===
The northern dissatisfaction with the constitution and terms of unification was a subject that the successive civilian governments continued to ignore. The northerns, especially the majority Isaaq, believed that the unified state would be divided federally (north and south) and that they would receive a fair share of representation post unification. The south proceeded to dominate all of the important posts of the new state, this included the President, Prime Minister, Minister of Defence, Minister of Interior and Minister of Foreign Affairs posts all given to politicians hailing from the south. The political marginalisation that majority of northerners felt was further exacerbated by economic deprivation, the north received just under 7 percent of nationally disbursed development assistance by the late 1970s, as more than 95% of all development projects and scholarships were distributed in the south. One example is cited by Hassan Megag Samater, the former director in charge of the Ministry of Education in Somaliland, he states that he had handed his post in 1966 with the northern region having "several hundred schools at all levels, from elementary schools to college. By the last year of the Barre regime, there was not a single school functioning at full strength."

=== 1969 coup ===
In October 1969 the military seized power in a coup following the assassination of President Abdirashid Shermarke and the ensuing political parliamentary debate on succession which ended in a deadlock. The army banned political parties, suspended the constitution and closed the National Assembly, General Siad Barre was chosen as the head of state and presided over the supreme revolutionary council. The new regime outlawed political dissent and employed a heavy handed approach in managing the state. The United Nations Development Programme stated that "the 21-year regime of Siyad Barre had one of the worst human rights records in Africa." The new regime became a client state of the Soviet Union and on the first anniversary of the coup officially adopted 'Scientific socialism as its core ideology.

== Prelude ==
=== Ethio-Somali War ===
Successive Somali governments had continually supported the cause of Somali irredentism and the concept of 'Greater Somalia', a powerful sentiment many Somalis carried, as a core goal of the state. This particularly had strong support from the Isaaq clan who notably sent many volunteers, especially in 1976 as they joined WSLF guerrilla insurgencies and sent many volunteers a year before the war took place. Another factor behind the strong support from the Isaaq was the fact that the border that was drawn between Ethiopia and Somalia cut off important grazing grounds for Isaaq tribesmen. Barre along with the Supreme Revolutionary Council, to entrench their rule and in an attempt to regain the Somali Region of Ethiopia, launched a war against Ethiopia in 1977, this war was referred to in Somalia as 'The War for Western Somalia'. The Soviet Union, which at the time was allied to both Somalia and Ethiopia turned against Barre, and (with their allies) provided enough support to the Ethiopian army to defeat the Somali forces and force a withdrawal from the Somali region of Ethiopia.

=== Displacement of Isaaq and arming of refugees ===
All of Somalia felt the impact of the Ogaden War defeat, however the northern region (where Isaaqs live) experienced the majority of the physical and human destruction due to its geographical proximity to the fighting. Somalia's defeat in the Ethio-Somali War caused an influx of Ethiopian refugees (mostly ethnic Somalis and some Oromo) across the border to Somalia. By 1979, official figures reported 1.3 million refugees in Somalia, more than half of them were settled in Isaaq lands in the north. This has caused great deal of burden on both the local Isaaqs and state apparatus, especially coming off a costly war with Ethiopia, Somali studies scholar I. M. Lewis noted that "the stark fact remained that the economy of the country simply did not possess the resources to absorb so many uprooted people."

The presence of such a large number of refugees, especially when Somalia's total population at the time was 4.1 million (UN estimates) meant that virtually one out of every four people in Somalia was a refugee. The Barre regime exploited the presence of such a large number of refugees as means of seeking foreign aid, as well as a vehicle to displacing those deemed hostile to the state, notably the Isaaqs, Human Rights Watch noted that:

"Northerners [Isaaqs] were dismissed from and not allowed to work in government offices dealing with refugee affairs, so that they would not discover the truth about the government's policies. Instead refugees, registered with UNHCR were given jobs in the offices dealing with refugee matters."

As the state became increasingly reliant on international aid, aid resources allocated for the refugees caused further resentment from the local Isaaq residents, especially as they felt no effort was made on the government's part to compensate them for bearing the burden of the war. Furthermore, Barre heavily favoured the Ogaden refugees, who belonged to the same clan (Darod) as him. Due to these ties, the Ogaden refugees enjoyed preferential access to "social services, business licenses and even government posts." As expressed animosity and discontent in the north grew, Barre armed the Ogaden refugees, and in doing so created an irregular army operating inside Isaaq territories. The regime's use of armed refugees against local Isaaq populations in the north is also referenced in an Africa Watch report:

"[M]any Ogadeni refugees were recruited into the WSLF. The WSLF was ostensibly being trained to fight Ethiopia to regain the Ogaden [Western Somalia], but, in fact, terrorized the Isaak [Isaaq] civilian population living in the border region, which came to fear them more than the Ethiopian army. Killings, rape and looting became common."

Barre was essentially ensuring the loyalty of the Ogaden refugees through continued preferential treatment and protection at the expense of the local Isaaq who were not only bypassed for economic, social and political advancement but also forcefully suppressed by both the Somali Armed Forces and the Ogaden refugee militias.

The settlement of Ogaden refugees in Isaaq territory, and the arming of these groups (which effectively created a foreign army in the north), further antagonised local Isaaq population. The armed Ogaden refugees, together with members of the Marehan and Dhulbahanta soldiers (whom were provoked and encouraged by the Barre regime) started a campaign of terror against the local Isaaqs as they raped women, murdered unarmed civilians, and prevented families from conducting proper burials. Barre ignored Isaaq complaints throughout the 1980s, this along with Barre's repression of criticism or discussions of the widespread atrocities in the north had the effect of turning the long-standing Isaaq disaffection into open opposition.

=== Afraad ===
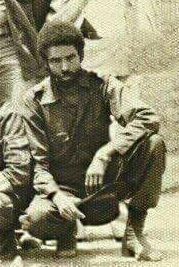
Afraad commander Mohamed Farah Dalmar Yusuf "Mohamed Ali"

One of the militias formed by the Ogaden refugees was the WSLF, officially created to fight Ethiopia and "reclaim ethnic Somali territory" in Ethiopia but it was used primarily against local Isaaq civilians and nomads. A Human Rights Watch's Africa Watch report states "The WSLF was ostensibly being trained to fight Ethiopia to regain the Ogaden, but, in fact, terrorized the Isaaq civilian population living in the border region, which came to fear them more than the Ethiopian army. Killing, rape and looting became common."

As for the looting, the Ogaden refugees from Ethiopia ransacked homes that were vacated by Isaaq civilians out of clan hatred. The Isaaqs entrepreneurial disposition was also a factor of the large-scale looting, which the Ogadenis saw as 'undeserved':

In northern Somalia, the Isaaq clans confronted a massive influx of Ogadeni refugees from eastern Ethiopia whom Siyad encouraged to loot property, attack people, and destabilize cities. An instrument of oppression, the Ogadenis and the regular Somali army were viewed as alien forces sent to oppress the Isaaq. Clan animosity intersected with class hatred as rural Ogadeni clansmen harassed Isaaq entrepreneurs with a visceral hatred, convinced that their wealth and urban commodities were undeserved. The Isaaq tell hilarious, but pathetic stories about Ogadenis who stole modern household appliances from homes in Hargeisa, Borama and Burao, then retreated with their "trophies" to use them in the remote pasture lands devoid of electricity.

As the WSLF, supported by the Barre regime, continued to attack and commit atrocities against the Isaaq, a delegation was sent to meet President Barre in 1979 to request making a stop to WSLF abuses. In spite of promises made to the Isaaq elders the violence against civilians and nomads by WSLF continued.

The continued abuse of WSLF and the government's indifference to the suffering of Isaaq civilians and nomads prompted many Isaaq army officers to desert the army with a view to creating their own armed movement to fight Ethiopia, one that would also intimidate the WSLF and discourage further violence against Isaaq civilians. Their new movement, supported and financed by Isaaqs, was named Afraad (the fourth unit) and became operational in 1979. The Isaaq movement of Afraad immediately came into conflict with the Ogaden clan's faction of WSLF in the form of a number of bloody encounters between the two groups. Afraad's objective was to push the WSLF out of their strongholds (Isaaq territory) whereas the WSLF responded by retaliating further against Isaaq civilians living in the border region.

The situation was further exacerbated by the appointment of Mohamed Hashi Gani, a cousin of President Siad Barre and fellow Marehan Darod, as the military commander of the northern regions with headquarters in Hargeisa in 1980. Gani's rule was especially harsh against Isaaq, he removed them from all key economic positions, seized their properties and placed the northern regions under emergency laws. He also ordered the transfer of Afraad away from the border region, giving the WSLF complete control of the border region, thus leaving Isaaq nomads in the area without any protection against WSLF violence.

A United Nations inspection team that visited the area in 1988 reported that the Ethiopian refugees (Ogaden) were carrying weapons supplied by the Somali Army. The UN team reported that, with the Somali Army's encouragement, the Ogadeni refugees carried out extensive looting in several northern towns.

This was followed by the systematic efforts to remove all Isaaqs from positions of power including the military, judiciary and security services. The transfer of power to non-Isaaq pro-government individuals further pushed Isaaq communities to rebel against Barre's regime

=== Mass arrests of civil society volunteers ===
In the early 1980s a voluntary service movement in Hargeisa officially called the Hargeisa Hospital Group was gaining ground. Nicknamed Uffo, which in Somali means the wind before the storm, the voluntary service group, consisting mostly of young professionals from the diaspora that were educated and had worked overseas, imported drugs and basic equipment using private funds while its members volunteered to work without pay, including work such as completely renovating the central hospital in the city. The movement spread throughout the city and soon became both a symbol of not only self-help and self-sufficiency but opposition to the Somali government as well, especially opposition to the newly appointed governor of the northern region, General Mohamed Hashi Gani, a cousin of Siad Barre, who ran the region with an iron fist. Uffo eventually ceased being a regular organisation but rather became an opinion, a state of mind. The movement had already lacked a formal structure, a membership list or any form of dues. For General Hashi Gani, things had gone too far and the movement needed to be uprooted as soon as possible.

The police subsequently started arresting Uffo sympathisers and anyone associated with them, often on the basis of family connections, friendships or rumours. It reached a point where even being seen in the company of a ‘suspect’ was enough grounds for a person to be put in custody. On 20 February 1982, all Uffo sympathisers that were arrested taken to court to face trial and were later sentenced to long jail sentences on 6 March. The trial of the Uffo members caused massive riots in the streets of Hargeisa that lasted for three days, remembered as the dhagaxtuur, "the stone throwing" in Somali. When ordinary civilians started throw stones at the police officers guarding the tribunal the police replied by opening fire on the crowd, killing approximately 30 civilians. In response, General Gani mobilized his forces and sent tanks and personnel carriers to try control squash the riots. This slaughter of volunteers that worked for the common good were so absurdly inappropriate and triggering that demonstrations soon occurred over the whole of the northern regions, leading to further casualties as the government cracked down on protestors.

Africa Watch states:

"the arrest of the Hargeisa Group and their trial in February 1982 radicalised the student community and virtually turned schools into war zones between the Government and students"

— Africa Watch, A Note on "My Teachers' Group"

== Formation of the SNM ==
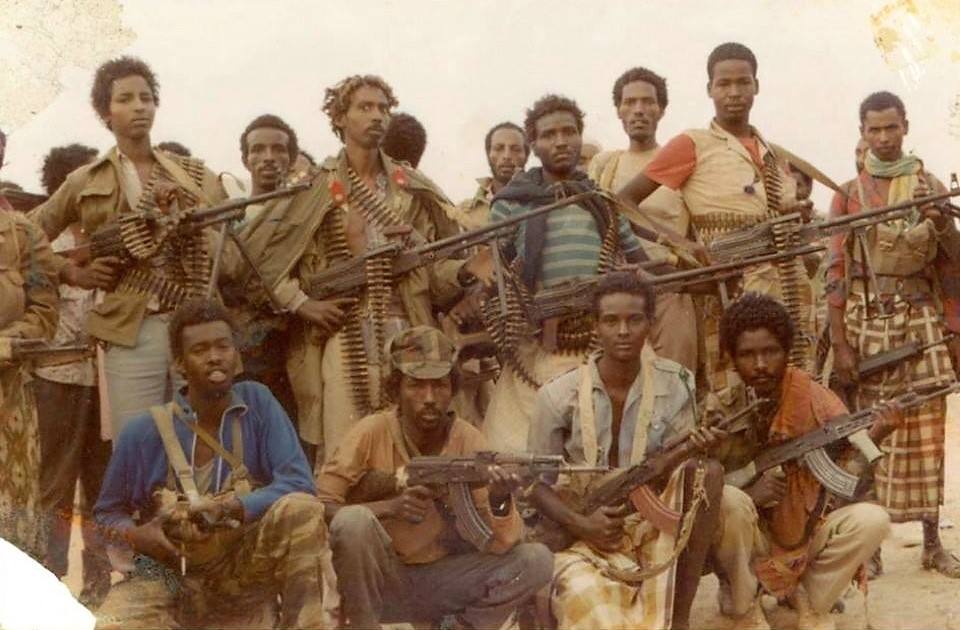
SNM fighters, late 1980's

In 1977, a group of Somali expats in Saudi Arabia hailing from the Isaaq clan begun to collect funds for the aim of launching a newspaper covering Somali affairs. The grassroots group has grown into a semi-political party unofficially referred to as Somali Islamic Democratic party (later Somali National movement) Representing intellectuals, businessmen and prominent figures of the ex-pat community in Saudi Arabia.

By the end of 1979, the group had a strong foothold in local Somali communities in Riyadh, Dhahran, Khobar and especially Jeddah where they set meetings for every 3 months discussing the deteriorating situation in the Somali Democratic Republic post Ogaden War.

In 1980, the key leaders in the Saudi group determined that London provided a more favourable political climate for operating an international dissident group, therefore several people relocated to London to work full-time with the movement. The organisation was formally founded in Jeddah in April 1981 by an intellectual elite with the objective of overthrowing Barre's dictatorial regime.

=== The First Jeddah Congress ===
At the first congress in Jeddah, the organisation's name was officially changed to the "Somali National Movement" (SNM). Additionally, there was a call to action for the proposed funding of three full-time staff members. These individuals would go on to quit their jobs in Saudi Arabia to devote their time to the movement.

=== United Kingdom ===
The "Saudi group" reached out to the larger Somali population in United Kingdom soon after, and the organisation's formation was announced on 6 April 1981 in Connaught Hall, London. The said communities composed primarily of students, activists, intellectuals and African communities, particularly Somalis in London, Cardiff, Sheffield, Manchester and Liverpool played greater role in raising funds and spreading awareness of the human rights violation under Mohamed Siad Barre regime.

Due to political and logistical obstacles in Saudi Arabia, the Somali Islamic Democratic party decide to move its headquarters to London and along with Somali London Association, Somali Welfare Association, Somali National party (as well as members of the Somali Student Union) to converge and launch Somali National Movement in 1981.

This press conference was reportedly attended by over 500 Somalis from across Europe. A four-page press release also criticised the nepotism, corruption and chaos into which Somalia endured under Siad Barre's dictatorship, and outlined the case to overthrow the regime to reestablish a just and democratic system. Additionally, the SNM advocated a mixed economy and a neutral foreign policy, therefore rejecting alignment with the Soviet Union or the United States and calling for the dismantling of all foreign military bases in the region. However, in the late 1980s a pro-Western foreign policy was adopted and the organisation favored United States involvement in a post-Siad Barre Somalia. Ideologically, the SNM was a Western-leaning movement and was described as "one of the most democratic movements in the Horn of Africa".

Emblem of the Somali National Movement

==== The First SNM Conference ====
On 18 October 1981, the organisation had its first official conference at the International Student Union of the University of London. There were 14 delegates drawn from England, Saudi Arabia and other Gulf states in addition to the London-based steering committee. During this, conference it issued a press release entitled ‘A Better Alternative’, which stated that any Somali was welcome to join the movement as long as they believed in the SNM's principles.

== Military activities ==
=== Consolidation ===
From February 1982, Isaaq army officers and fighters from the Fourth Brigade started moving into Ethiopia where they formed the nucleus of what would later become the armed wing of the SNM. In the same year, the SNM moved its headquarters from London to Dire Dawa, Ethiopia where 3 key military bases were established. From here the SNM successfully launched a guerrilla war against the Barre regime through incursions and hit and run operations on army positions within Isaaq territories, especially into the Waqooyi Galbeed and Togdheer regions, before returning to Ethiopia, including an attack on Somali government forces in Wajale on 25 October 1982, killing 10 soldiers. The SNM continued this pattern of attacks from 1982 and throughout the 1980s, at a time the Ogaden Somalis (some of whom were recruited refugees) made up the bulk of Barre's armed forces who were committing acts of genocide against the Isaaq people of the north. It was clear then that the Barre regime had labelled the entire Isaaq population as enemy of the state. To weaken support for the SNM within the Isaaqs, the government enacted a policy of systematic use of large-scale violence against the local Isaaq population. A report by Africa Watch stated that the policy was "the outcome of a specific conception of how the war against the insurgents should be fought," with the logic being to "punish civilians for their presumed support for the SNM attacks and to discourage them from further assistance".

A growing number of northern civilian recruits and defectors from the Somali army, drawn almost exclusively from the Isaaq clan, were shaped into a guerrilla force and trained to produce a hard-core of disciplined fighters. Although the Ethiopians were said to have initially only supplied ammunition, Isaaq recruits came with their own arms in addition the equipment seized from the Somalian army. Soon after, the Somali army established the "Isaaq Exterminator" command which aimed to ethnically cleanse the Isaaq population.

Over the following years, the SNM made numerous clandestine military incursions into northwest Somalia. Although these attacks never posed a direct threat to the regime's control of the area, such activities and the boldness and tenacity of its small force were a constant irritation to the Barre regime. According to Hassan Isse, 1985–86 was the most effective period of guerrilla warfare by the SNM against the Somalian regime whereby its operations extended southwards with support from Dir clansmen which would later call themselves the "Southern SNM".

Throughout the war, the SNM used vehicles it had seized from the Somalian government, such as teknikos equipped with light and medium weapons and BM-21 rocket launchers. The SNM possessed antitank weapons such as Sovet B-10 tubes as well as RPG-7s while for air defense the SNM operated Soviet 30mm and 23mm guns as well, a dozen Soviet ZU23 2s as well as Czech-made twin-mounted 30mm ZU30s. In addition, the SNM also maintained a small fleet consisting of armed speed boats that operated from the ports of Maydh and Xiis towns in Sanaag region.

=== Mandera assault ===
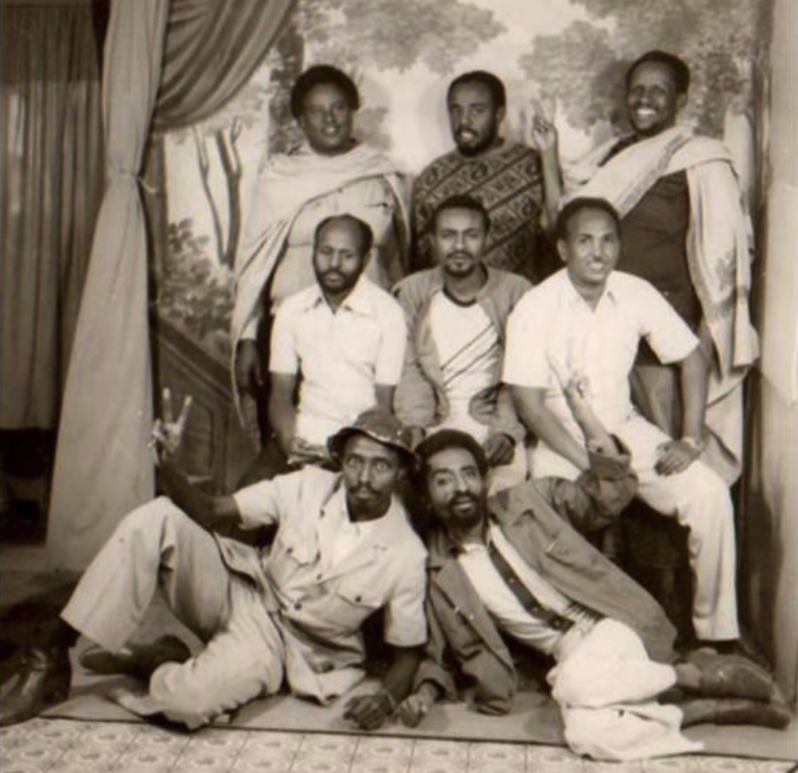
Northern dissidents freed from Mandera Prison by the SNM

On 2 January 1983, the SNM launched its first military operation against the Somalian government. Operating from Ethiopian bases, commando units attacked Mandera Prison near Berbera and freed a group of northern dissidents. The assault liberated more than 700 political prisoners according to SNM reports; subsequent independent estimates indicated that approximately about a dozen government opponents escaped. Simultaneously, SNM commando units raided the Cadaadle armoury near Berbera and escaped with an undetermined amount of arms and ammunition. Directed by Colonel Mohamed Hashi Lihle, it was deemed to be the SNM's "most striking initial military success" and thought to have produced a more coherent and better organised opposition force.

Lihle's speech to the freed Mandera prisoners:

O prisoners, you are from everywhere.'- Now we will release you. You have three options to choose from: (1) whoever wants to join the SNM, as we are fighting the regime, you can come and join the Jihad (struggle); (2) whoever wants to go and join his family, we will help you get back home; (3) whoever wants to join the regime, you should know we pushed them back to Abdaal when we came; so go to them and we will not do anything to you until you reach them. But be careful: we might attack you later and then our bullets will hurt you. So choose one of these options.

New African Magazine in 1989 states:

The SNM is very popular among the Somalis especially in the Northern Regions. Within the six-year period that they were operating from Ethiopia, they carried out many successful military operations and created military heroes like Mohamed Ali, Colonel Lihle, and Captain Ibrahim Kodbur.

=== Birjeex Operation ===
On 8 April 1983, the National Security Service, Somalia's intelligence agency that reported directly to Siad Barre, arrested high-ranking SNM member Abdullahi Askar, who was conducting a covert operation in Hargeisa, near the National Cinema at night and transferred him to Birjeeh, a former military headquarters. The next morning, he was handed over to the command of the 26th Division of the Somali National Army, commanded by Mohamed Hashi Gani, a cousin of Siad Barre. Throughout the duration of his imprisonment he was subject to brutal torture in an attempt by the military junta to extract information from him about the whereabouts of SNM members and other classified information. It was planned that on 12 April Abdullahi Askar would be taken to Hargeisa Poetry and Entertainment Council on the occasion for the 23rd anniversary of the establishment of the Somali Armed Forces. The goal was to exhibit a demoralized and battered Abdullahi Askar, bleeding and half-naked in front of an audience, presenting him as "the defeated SNM", to dispel rumors that he had escaped military custody and to ensure that he was not missing, and that if he were absent there was little he could do.

The day before that was due to happen, on 11 April, an SNM rescue mission consist of five armed men in a landcruiser, led by Ibrahim Ismail Mohamed (nicknamed Koodbuur), arrived at the building where he was held and after a short firefight managed to free Abdullahi from custody. During the firefight that ensued the squad lost a fighter, Said Birjeh while two Somali army soldiers were killed. The SNM fighters managed to escape and eventually cross the border back into Ethiopia.

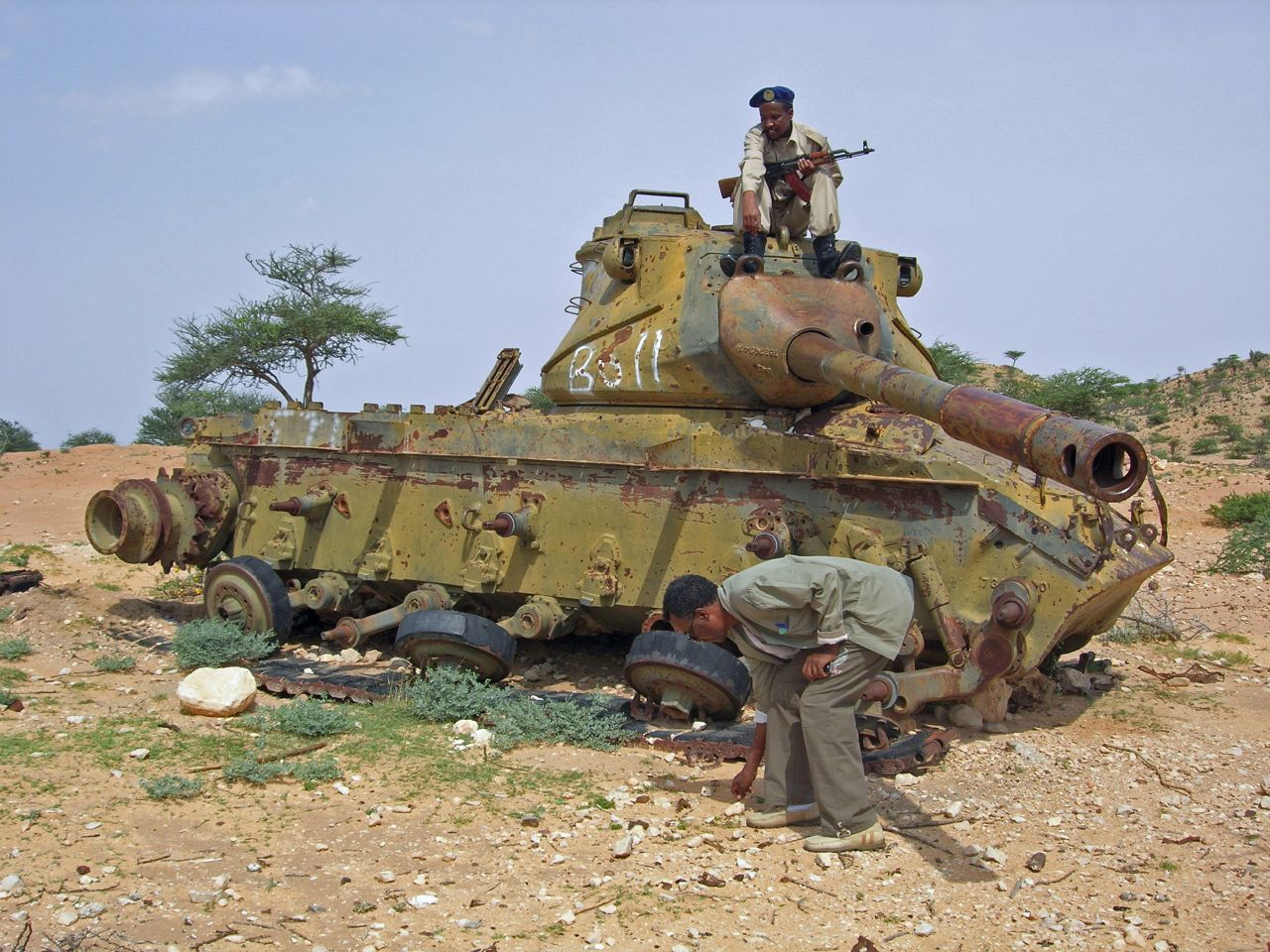
A destroyed M47 Patton in Somaliland, left behind wrecked from the war

=== Hijacking of Somali Airlines Boeing 707 ===
On 24 November 1984, a group of three armed SNM fighters led by Awil Adami Burhani boarded and seized a Somali Airlines Boeing 707 carrying 130 people (118 passengers and 12 crew members) on a flight from Mogadishu to Jeddah, Saudi Arabia. Among the passengers on the flight were a senior American diplomat, two Italians, two South Yemen nationals, a North Yemen national, an Egyptian diplomat and a United Nations staff member. The fighters threatened to blow up the plane if the Somalian government did not release a number of SNM-affiliated political prisoners, who would after their release be sent to Djibouti. Another demand was for the execution of seven Isaaq students, The oldest being 18, who were convicted of dissent, and whose execution was due to happen on that day, to be called off by the Somalian government and for international guarantees to be given for the youths' safety should they be released.

The plane attempted to land in Aden, however, the South Yemeni authorities refused to grant the plane permission to land, which lead to the aircraft subsequently landing in Djibouti before taking off again and landing at Bole International Airport in Addis Ababa. After four days of tense negotiations between the SNM and the Somalian government, brokered by Italy and the local Ethiopian authorities, the Somalian government conceded to the demands made by the SNM and released the political prisoners as well as the youths that were due to be executed.

==== Other attacks in 1984 ====
The hijacking wasn't the only attack the SNM conducted that year. On 11 June, SNM rebels clashed with Somali government troops near Hargeisa, killing six government soldiers. The SNM rebels also launched a military attack on government forces on 13 November 1984. In December 1984 the SNM reportedly had a presence in the mountains surrounding Sheikh.

=== Golis offensive ===
On 25 November 1984, the SNM launched a hit and run attack in the Golis mountain chain, specifically the mountain of Meriya which is located at a strategic position just northeast of the city of Burao. The attack was conducted by the 1st Brigade based in Balidhaye, a town in the Somali region of Ethiopia, and was commanded by Mohamed Kahin Ahmed, the current Interior Minister of Somaliland.

The brigade was split into three groups; one led by Abdillahi Askar and consisting of 140 soldiers would attack the western portions in the Awdal region, specifically the town of Dilla where the 26th Division of the SNA was positioned, one led by Mohamed Kahin Ahmed consisting of 130 soldiers would assault the Golis mountains themselves and the mountain of Meriya as well as the Burdhab mountains in Saraar, and a third one led by Ibrahim Abdullahi (nicknamed Dhegaweyne) would assault the Sheikh mountains near Berbera.

On 27 November, Mohamed Kahin's contingent reached the mountain of Meriya where fierce clashes occurred and Mohamed's contingent inflicted heavy casualties on Barre's forces before retreating back to their base in Balidhaye along with the other two groups, having fulfilled their mission.

==== Government retaliation ====
In response to this surprising loss inflicted on Barre's forces, the Somalian government began executing innocent civilians as revenge, accusing them of allegedly being members of the SNM and aiding them. On 20 December 1984, almost a month after the hit and run attack conducted by the SNM, a military court in Burao sentenced 45 civilians, mostly elders and teachers, to death and executed them the same day. Military courts in Sheikh and Hargeisa had earlier in November also sentenced 48 civilians in total to death and executed them.

=== Burco-Duurray offensive ===
On 17 October 1984, the 1st Brigade of the SNM, led by Mohamed Kahin Ahmed, launched an offensive on the SNA contingency based in Burco-Duurray, a town in the Jarar zone in Ethiopia near the border with Somaliland. The 1st Brigade consisted of around 400 men at the time, while the SNA contingency based in the area consisted of 1,000 men, as well as 70 technicals and other heavy military vehicles. Heavy clashes ensued whereby the SNM lost 27 men, including the commander of SNM's military wing Mohamed Hashi Lihle, while the SNA lost 170 soldiers as well as 17 military vehicles.

=== Assassination of security officers ===
In late 1986, SNM fighters carried out an assassination operation targeting security officers belonging to the National Security Service of Somalia, the main intelligence agency of Barre's regime. Among those assassinated by the SNM include Ahmed Aden, the deputy intelligence chief of the northern regions, his deputy Ilyas and the intelligence chief of Hargeisa's Laqas district. Earlier that year, on 3 March, SNM rebels clashed with government troops near Hargeisa and Sibidhley, killing about 100 government soldiers. SNM rebels also killed 80 government troops in Hargeisa on 18 September.

=== Attacks in 1986-7 ===
On 20 January 1986 the SNM launched an attack on government forces in Borama, destroying a government security office, a police station and a bank. On the same day the SNM also attacked government army camps in Lebisagale, Qorilugud and Wadaamago.

On 23 January 1987 SNM units attacked a platoon of the Somali army's 16th Division based in Duurey, killing five soldiers and injuring seven. On 1 February SNM units clashed with Southern reinforcements at Ged Debleh near Hargeisa, killing three senior military officers. On 2 February SNM forces blew up the police station in Luuq District in Gedo, southern Somalia, with the police station being entirely obliterated. On the same day, the SNM attacked Somali army positions in Gorayo Hume, killing 16 and setting the unit's food store and ammunition dump ablaze. In the same month however, another clash with Somali troops killed around 200 SNM rebels. On 29 June 1987 SNM units launched an attack on Somali regime forces stationed in Dabaqabad, 50 km southeast of Burao, leaving 14 dead and eight injured.

=== Liberation of Burao ===
The Somali National Movement attacked and captured the city of Burao (then the third largest city in the country) on Friday 27 May 1988. They captured the town in two hours and immediately took over the military compound at the airport (where the largest number of soldiers were stationed), the Burao central police station and the prison, where they freed political prisoners (including schoolchildren) from the city's main jail. The government forces retreated, regrouped at Goon-Ad just outside the city, and in the late afternoon, entered the centre of town. According to reports by Human Rights Watch's Africa Watch, the soldiers, upon entering the city, went on a rampage on 27 and 28 May. This included "dragging men out of their houses and shooting them at point blank range" and summary killing of civilians, the report also noted that "civilians of all ages who had gathered in the centre of town, or those standing outside their homes watching the events were killed on the spot. Among the victims were many students." There was also widespread looting by the soldiers, and some people were reportedly killed as a result.

Following the first two days of the conflict, angered by the extent to which Isaaqs welcomed the SNM incursion, and frustrated by their inability to contain the SNM advance, the military started attacking the civilian population without restraint "as if it was the enemy". The military used "heavy artillery and tanks, causing severe damage, both to civilians and to property. Bazookas, machine guns, hand grenades and other weapons of mass destruction were also directed against civilian targets in Hargeisa which had also been attacked as well as in Burao."

A United States Congressional General Accounting Office team reported the Somali government's response to the SNM attack as follows:

The Somali army reportedly responded to the SNM attacks in May 1988 with extreme force, inflicting heavy civilian casualties and damages to Hargeisa and Burao....The Somali military resorted to using artillery and aerial shelling in heavily populated urban centres in its effort to retake Burao and Hargeisa. A majority of the refugees we interviewed stated that their homes were destroyed by shelling despite the absence of SNM combatants from their neighbourhoods....The refugees told similar stories of bombings, strafings, and artillery shelling in both cities and, in Burao, the use of armored tanks. The majority saw their houses either damaged or destroyed by the shelling. Many reported seeing members of their families killed in the barrage....

Refugee interviews conducted by Africa Watch described how the government separated the non-Isaaqs from the Isaaqs before the attack was initiated:

As soon as the fighting broke out, the government used loudspeakers to sort the civilians out into Darood and Isaak. They would shout, "Who is from Galkayo? Mogadishu? Las Anod? Garoe?" [Non-Isaaq territory]. They appealed to the non-Isaaks to leave so they could burn the town and all those who remained behind. Most of the people from these towns left; the government provided them with transportation.

==== Aerial bombardment and destruction of Burao ====
Somali Air Force aircraft started intense aerial bombardment of Burao on Tuesday 31 May 1988. Burao, then the third largest city in Somalia was "razed to the ground", and most of its inhabitants fled the country to seek refuge in Ethiopia. Foreign aid workers who fled the fighting confirmed that Burao was "emptied out" as a result of the government's campaign.

=== Liberation of Hargeisa ===
Hargeisa was the second largest city of the country, it was also strategically important due to its geographic proximity to Ethiopia (which made it central to military planning of successive Somali governments). Preventing the city from falling to the SNM became a critical goal of the government both from a military strategy standpoint and the psychological impact such loss would have.

As news of the SNM advance on Burao reached government officials in Hargeisa, all banks were ordered to close, and army units surrounded the banks to prevent people from approaching. Both electricity and water-supply lines were cut from the city, and residents resorted to fetching water from streams, and due to it being the rainy season they were also able to collect water from rooftops. All vehicles (including taxis) were confiscated to control the movement of civilian population, this also ensured sufficient transport was available for the use of military and government officials. Top government officials evacuated their families to the capital Mogadishu. The period between 27 and 31 May 1988 was marked by much looting by government forces as well as mass arrests. Killings in Hargeisa started on 31 May.

A curfew was imposed on 27 May starting at 6:00 p.m, the army began systematic house-to-house searches, looking for SNM fighters. On the following day the curfew started earlier at 4:00 pm; the third day at 2:00 pm; and on the fourth day at 11:00 am.

Anticipating fighting to start, people stock-piled food, coal and other essential supplies. Government forces looted all warehouses and shops, with the open market of the city being one of their prime targets. Soldiers raided mosques and looted its carpets and loudspeakers. Later, civilians would be killed inside mosques. A significant number of civilian deaths at the time occurred as a result of government soldiers robbing them, those who refused to hand valuables (watches, jewellery and money) or were not quick enough to comply with soldiers' demands were shot on the spot. Another major cause of civilian deaths was food robbery, this was reportedily because the soldiers were not being supplied by the government.

==== The Hargeisa campaign ====
The SNM attack on Hargeisa started at 2:15 a.m. on 31 May. The government forces took a day or two to devise a plan by which they could defeat the SNM. Their counter-attack started with use of heavy weapons. These included long-range artillery guns that were placed on the hilltops near the Hargeisa Zoo, artillery guns were also placed on the hilltops behind the Badhka (an open ground used for public executions by the government). They then began to shell the city. The Human Rights Watch report includes testimony by foreign relief workers evacuated to Nairobi by the United Nations. One of them was Jean Metenier, a French hospital technician in Hargeisa, who told reporters upon arrival at Nairobi airport that "at least two dozen people were executed by firing squad against the wall of his house and the corpses subsequently dumped on the streets to serve "as an example."" The attacks on civilians were the result of the military's realisation the local Isaaq population of Hargeisa welcomed the SNM attack. This was the military's attempt at "punishing the civilians for their SNM sympathies" as well as an attempt to "destroy the SNM by denying them a civilian base of support".

==== Mass arrests in Hargeisa ====
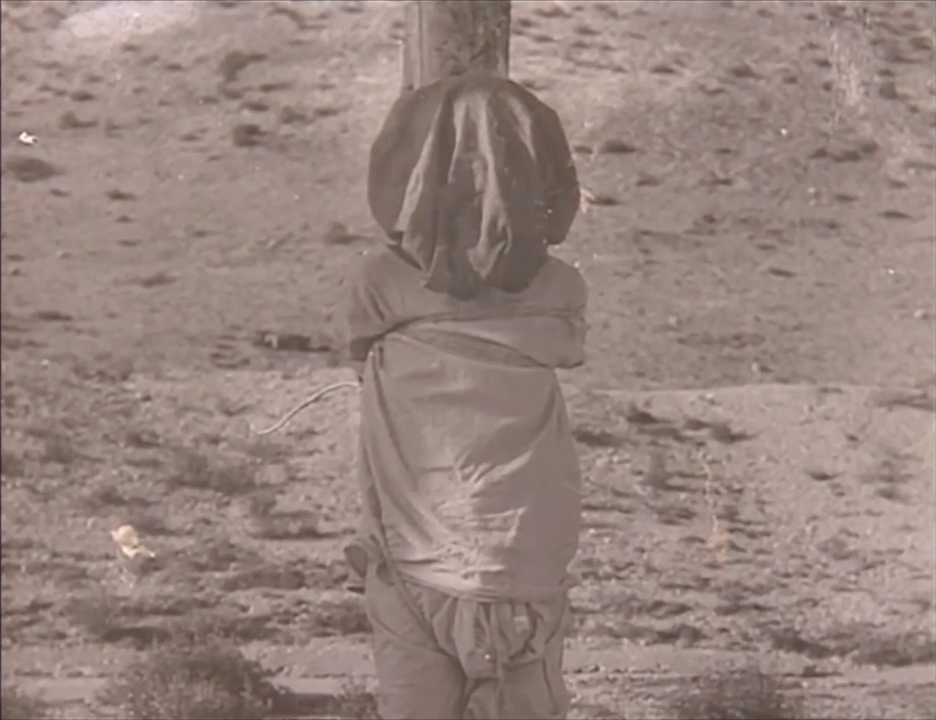
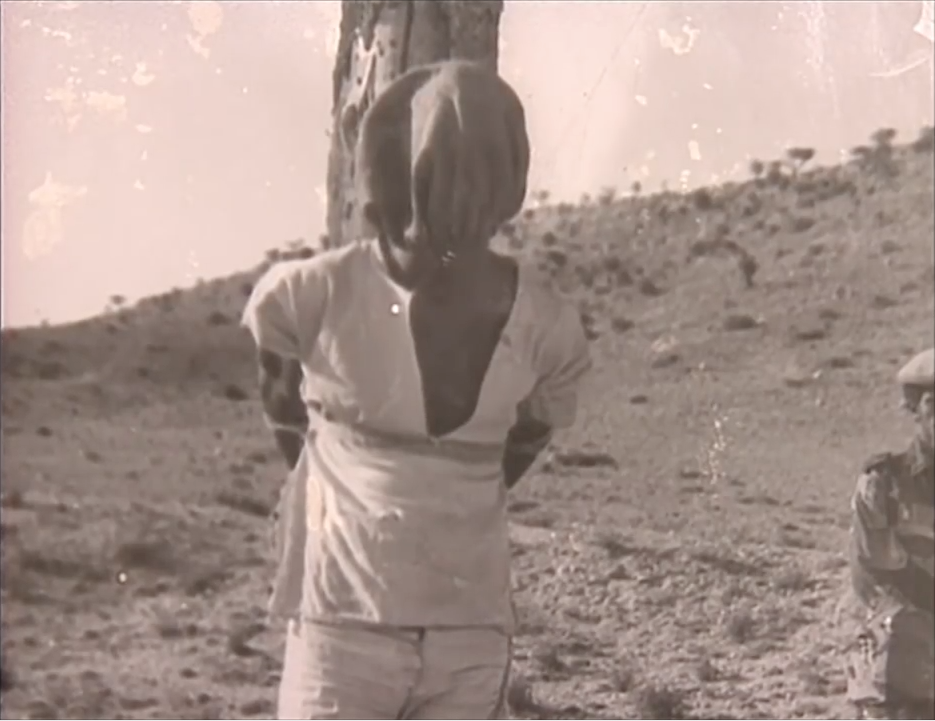
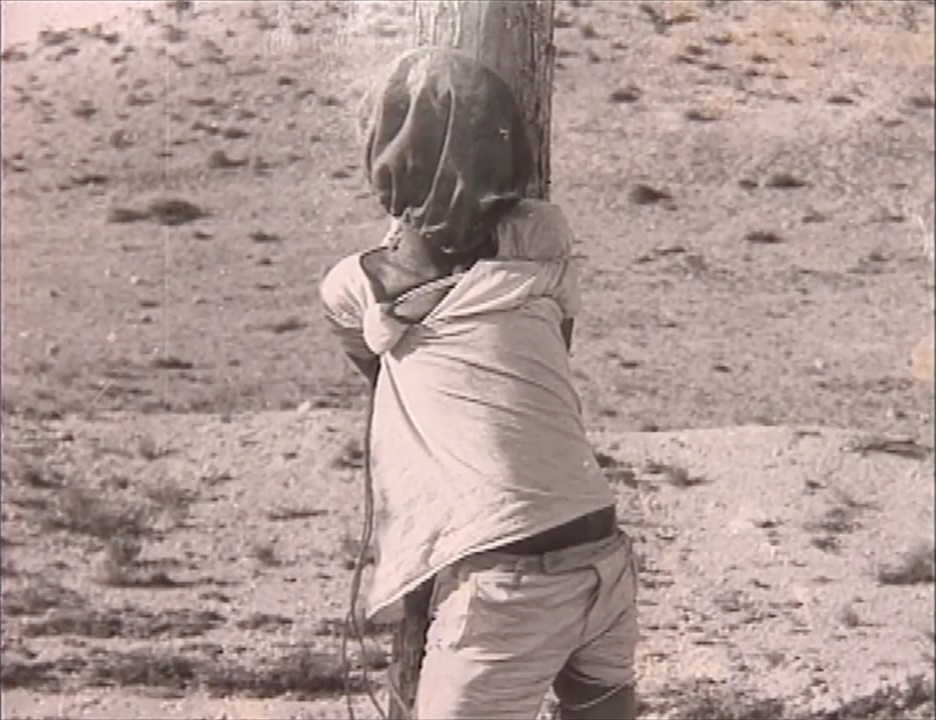
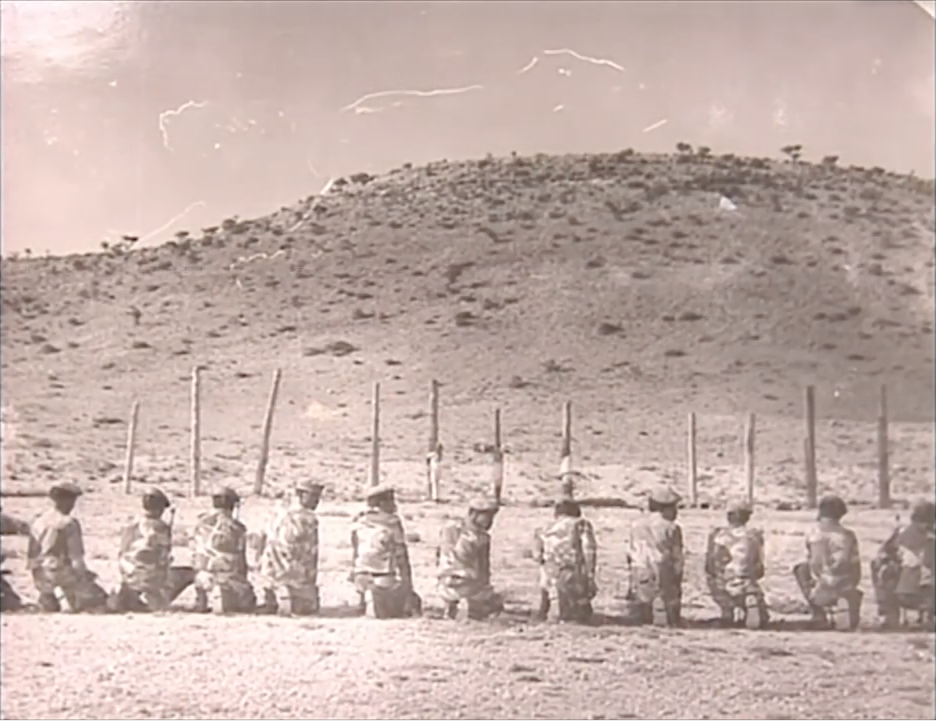
Summary executions of Hargeisa Isaaqs happened at Badhka, close to a hill in the outskirts of the city, where 25 soldiers shot blindfolded victims whose hands and feet were tied.

The government, upon hearing of the SNM attack on Burao, began rounding up Isaaq men fearing they would assist an SNM attack on Hargeisa. Detainees were taken to a number of locations including Birjeeh (a former military headquarters of the 26th Sector of the Somali Armed Forces), Malka-Durduro (a military compound), the Central Prison of Hargeisa, the headquarters of NSS (National Security Service), the headquarters of the Military Police as well as other secret detention centres. Isaaq military officers were one of the first groups to be arrested. According to Human Rights Watch's Africa Watch, some 700 Isaaqs from the armed forces were brought to one prison, this particular prison was already overcrowded, an additional 70 military personnel were then also brought for detention (40 from Gabiley and 30 from Hargeisa). Arrests were done at such scale that, to make room for the Isaaqs detainees, all non-Isaaqs were released, including those sentenced to death or life imprisonment for murder and drug-related offences. Some of those released to make room for Isaaq detainees were given arms and made guards over Isaaq detainees whilst others joined the military.

==== Aerial bombardment and destruction of Hargeisa ====
Artillery shelling of Hargeisa started on the third day of the fighting and was accompanied by large-scale aerial bombing of the city carried out by aircraft of the Somali Air Force. Somali government aircraft "took off from the Hargeisa Airport and then turned around to make repeated bombing runs on the city".

The scale of destruction was unprecedented, up to 90 percent of the city (then the second largest city in Somalia) was destroyed, (United States embassy estimated 70 percent of the city was damaged or destroyed). The testimony of Aryeh Neier, the co-founder of Human Rights Watch, confirms the large-scale nature of government attacks against civilians:

In an attempt to dislodge the SNM, the government is using artillery and air bombardment, especially Hargeisa and Buroa, on a daily basis, aiming particularly at civilian population targets. Reports from eyewitnesses speak of the town of Hargeisa as mere rubble, devastated to the point that it is barely recognizable even to its inhabitants.

The Guardian reported the scale of destruction as follows:

The civil war left Hargeisa in ruins: 80 percent of the building in the town were destroyed, many of them by the aerial bombardment of General Siad Barre's Zimbabwean mercenary pilots. The view from the air is of a town without roofs. The exposed pale green and blue plaster walls reflect the sunlight.

Many of the houses are boarded up because of the small anti-personnel mines scattered by Gen Siad Barre's forces when tens of thousands of Hargeisa residents fled. What was not destroyed was looted.

Other descriptions of what took place in Hargeisa include:

Siad Barre focused his wrath (and American-supported military might) against his Northern opposition. Hargeisa, Somalia's second city and the former capital of British Somaliland was bombed, strafed and rocketed. Some 50,000 people are believed to have lost their lives there as a result of summary executions, aerial bombardments and ground attacks. The city itself was destroyed. Streams of refugees fleeing the devastation were not spared by government planes. The term "genocide" came to be used more and more frequently by human rights observers.

Amnesty International confirmed the large-scale targeting and killing of civilian population by Somali government troops. The campaign had completely destroyed Hargeisa, causing its population of 500,000 to flee across the border and the city was "reduced to a ghost town with 14,000 buildings destroyed and a further 12,000 heavily damaged". The Congressional General Accounting Office team noted the extent to which residential districts were especially targeted by the army:

Hargeisa, the second largest city in Somalia, has suffered extensive damage from artillery and aerial shelling. The most extensive damage appeared to be in the residential areas where the concentration of civilians was highest, in the marketplace, and in public buildings in the downtown area. The U.S. Embassy estimated that 70 percent of the city has been damaged or destroyed. Our rough visual inspection confirms this estimate.

Much of Hargeisa appears to be a "ghost town," and many homes and building are virtually empty. Extensive looting has taken place even though the military has controlled the city since late July 1988. We were told that private property was taken from homes by the military in Hargeisa. Homes are devoid of doors, window frames, appliances, clothes, and furniture. The looting has resulted in the opening of what are called "Hargeisa markets" throughout the region, including Mogadishu and Ethiopia, were former residents have spotted their possessions. One observer remarked that Hargeisa is being dismantled piece by piece. We were told that long lines of trucks heavily laden with Hargeisa goods could be seen leaving the city, heading south towards Mogadishu after the heavy fighting had stopped.

The Governor of Hargeisa estimates the present population to be around 70,000, down from a pre-conflict population figure of 370,000. However, the current residents of Hargeisa are not believed to be the former Issak residents. Observers believe that Hargeisa is now composed largely of dependents of the military, which has a substantial, visible presence in Hargeisa, a significant number of Ogadeni refugees, and squatters who are using the properties of those who fled.

The report also stated that the city was without electricity or a functioning water system, and that the Somali government was "actively soliciting multilateral and bilateral donors for reconstruction assistance" of cities primarily destroyed by the government's own forces.

=== Somali counter-offensive ===
However, soon after the Somalian army was able to regain control of both cities by the end of July. This was due to unprecedented levels of internal reinforces, the employment of non-Isaaq militias and Ogaden refugees. Moreover, external assistance to the Somalian regime including mercenary pilots from South Africa and Libya in addition to economic and military aid from the UAE and Italy played a large role in recapturing the cities. Approximately, 50,000 people were killed between March 1988 and March 1989 as a result of the Somalian Army's "savage assault" on the Isaaq population. Although this operation was not viewed as successful, and the campaign had been enormously costly, claiming close to half of their fighters, it was seen as the death knell of Barre's regime and consequently a point of no return in Northern Somalia's (present day Somaliland) move towards independence. Furthermore, the Somalian Army's indiscriminate aerial and artillery bombing of both cities led to the SNM becoming overwhelmed with volunteers. Additionally, Barre's response this operation was seen "as an attack on the whole of the Isaaq people" and led to the Isaaq uniting behind the SNM.

Elders across the Isaaq community took on a leading role to advance mass mobilisation efforts to rejuvenate decimated SNM numbers and capitalise on the enhanced support to organisation by Isaaq civilians. After meetings, it was decided that the Elders also known as the "Guurti" would become responsible for organising logistical support and recruiting new SNM combatants. Consequently, sub-clan affiliation became a key aspect of the military wing of the organisation and the "Guurti" became an integral part of the SNM's central committee after 1988. As a result of this increased support from the local population, the SNM was able to defeat the Somalian army in the North-West of the country.

By June 1989, the SNM was actively mounting attacks on major hubs across the North-West, blockading transport routes and interfering with regime supplies to military garrisons. As a result, the Barre regime gradually lost control of the area by December 1989 with exception to major towns which were under active siege by the SNM. On 5 December 1989, the SNM announced that they have taken control of Hargeisa.

Over the subsequent few years, the SNM would exert control of the vast majority of North-Western Somalia and expanded its operations to approximately 50 km East of Erigavo. Although it never gained full control of major cities including Hargeisa, Burao and Berbera but resorted to laying siege on them. By the beginning of 1991, the SNM succeeded in taking control of North-Western Somalia including Hargeisa and other regional capitals.

=== Assassination of 26th Sector commander ===
On 17 August 1989 Colonel Shukri Bedel, who succeeded Colonel Omar Jess after he defected from the government and established the Somali Patriotic Movement, alongside seven other SNA officers were killed by a landmine explosion at Arabsiyo on the western outskirts of Hargeisa.

== Barre regime retaliation ==
During the ongoing conflict between the forces of the Somali National Movement and the Somali Army, the Somali government's genocidal campaign against the Isaaq took place between May 1988 and March 1989. According to Alex de Waal, Jens Meierhenrich and Bridget Conley-Zilkic:

What began as a counterinsurgency against the Somali National Movement rebels and their sympathizers, and escalated into genocidal onslaught against the Isaaq clan family, turned into the disintegration of both government and rebellion and the replacement of institutionalized armed forces with fragmented clan-based militia. The genocidal campaign ended in anarchy, and the state collapse that followed bred further genocidal campaigns by some of the militia groups that then seized power at a local level.

In 1987, Siad Barre, the president of Somalia, frustrated by lack of success of the army against insurgents from the Somali National Movement in the north of country, offered the Ethiopian government a deal in which they stop sheltering and giving support to the SNM in return for Somalia giving up its territorial claim over Ethiopia's Somali Region. Ethiopia was in agreement and a deal was signed on 3 April 1988 that included a clause confirming agreement not to assist rebel organisations based in each other's territories. The SNM felt the pressure to cease their activities on the Ethiopia-Somalia border, and decided to attack the northern territories of Somalia to take control of the major cities in the north. The brutal nature of the Siad Barre government response was unprecedented, and led to what Robin Cohen described as one of the "worst civil wars in Africa".

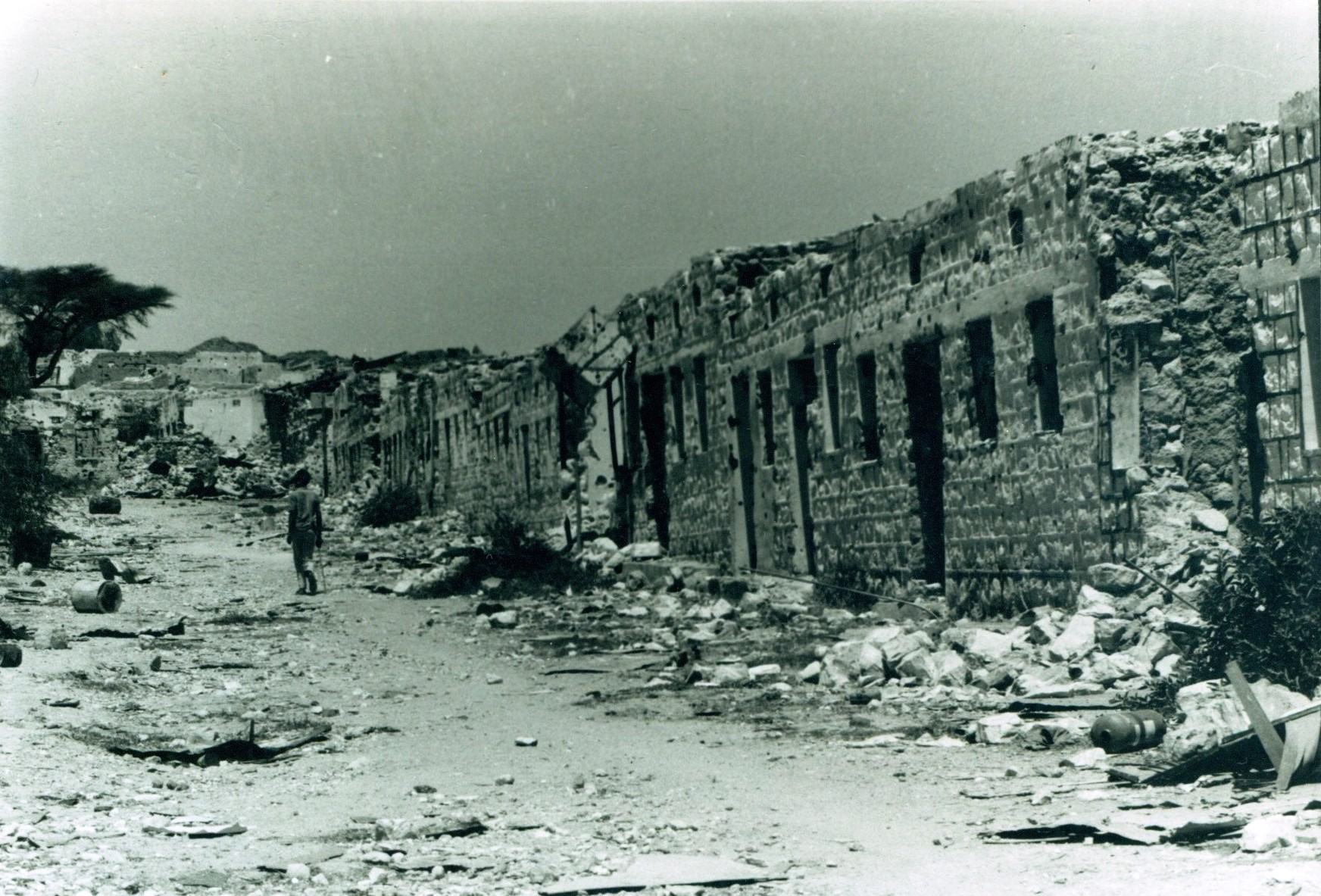
Up to 90% of Hargeisa (2nd largest city of the Somali Republic) was destroyed.

Barre's response to the SNM attacks was of unparalleled brutality, with explicit aims of handling the "Isaaq problem", he ordered "the shelling and aerial bombardment of the major cities in the northwest and the systematic destruction of Isaaq dwellings, settlements and water points". The Siad Barre regime targeted civilian members of the Isaaq group specifically, especially in the cities of Hargeisa and Burco and to that end employed the use of indiscriminate artillery shelling and aerial bombardment against civilian populations belonging to the Isaaq clan.

Bruce Jentleson, former director of the Sanford School of Public Policy describes the massacre of Isaaq civilians as follows:

Government forces responded with "appalling savagery", targeting the entire Isaaq civilian population with arrests, rape, mass executions, and indiscriminate shooting and bombing, Hundreds of thousands of Isaaq refugees fled for their lives across the Ethiopian border; government warplanes strafed them as they fled. As many as fifty thousand Somalis died and the city of Hargeisa was virtually levelled in what outside analysts depicted as a "genocidal" campaign by the Barre regime against the Isaaq.

The use of large-scale aerial bombardment was unprecedented in the history of African civil unrest. The brutal response of the Siad Barre government did not stop there, in discussing the systematic way in which the government targeted Isaaq people with aim to inflict as much loss in property and life, Waldron and Hasci published the following account:

General Mohammed Said 'Morgan', one of Siad Barre's sons-in-law, [was given] the opportunity to put into operation further elements of a pacification plan he had drawn up earlier. Government forces reacted with appalling savagery to the SNM seizure of Burao and near capture of Hargeisa. The response culminated in the bombing and artillery bombardment of Hargeisa to a point of virtual destruction. Civilian refugees fleeing towards the border were bombed and gunned indiscriminately. It was seen, probably rightly, as an attack on the whole Isaaq people...

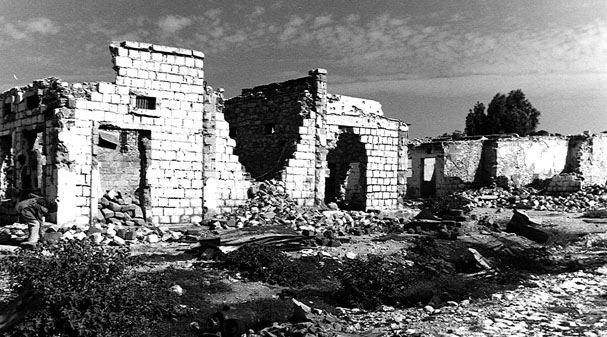
The attack on Hargeysa combined the use of artillery shelling and aerial bombardment.

Within the first three months of the conflict, Isaaqs fled their cities on such a large scale that cities of the north became devoid of their population. Civilian Isaaqs were "killed, imprisoned under severe conditions, forced to flee across the border, or became displaced in the far-off countryside".

The Siad Barre government adopted a policy that "any able-bodied Isaaq who could help the SNM had to be killed. Those who could be of financial help or influence to the SNM, because of social status, were to be put in prison." Though this policy did not exclude children or the elderly, the result was that "more than 90% of the people killed were between the ages of 15-35 years."

Somali historian Mohamed Haji Ingiriis refers to "the state-sponsored genocidal campaigns leveled at the Isaaq clan-group", which he notes is "popularly known in public discourses as the 'Hargeisa Holocaust'" as a "forgotten genocide".

A number of genocide scholars (including Israel Charny, Gregory Stanton, Deborah Mayersen, and Adam Jones) as well as international media outlets, such as The Guardian, The Washington Post and Al Jazeera among others, have referred to the case as one of genocide.

=== Berbera ===
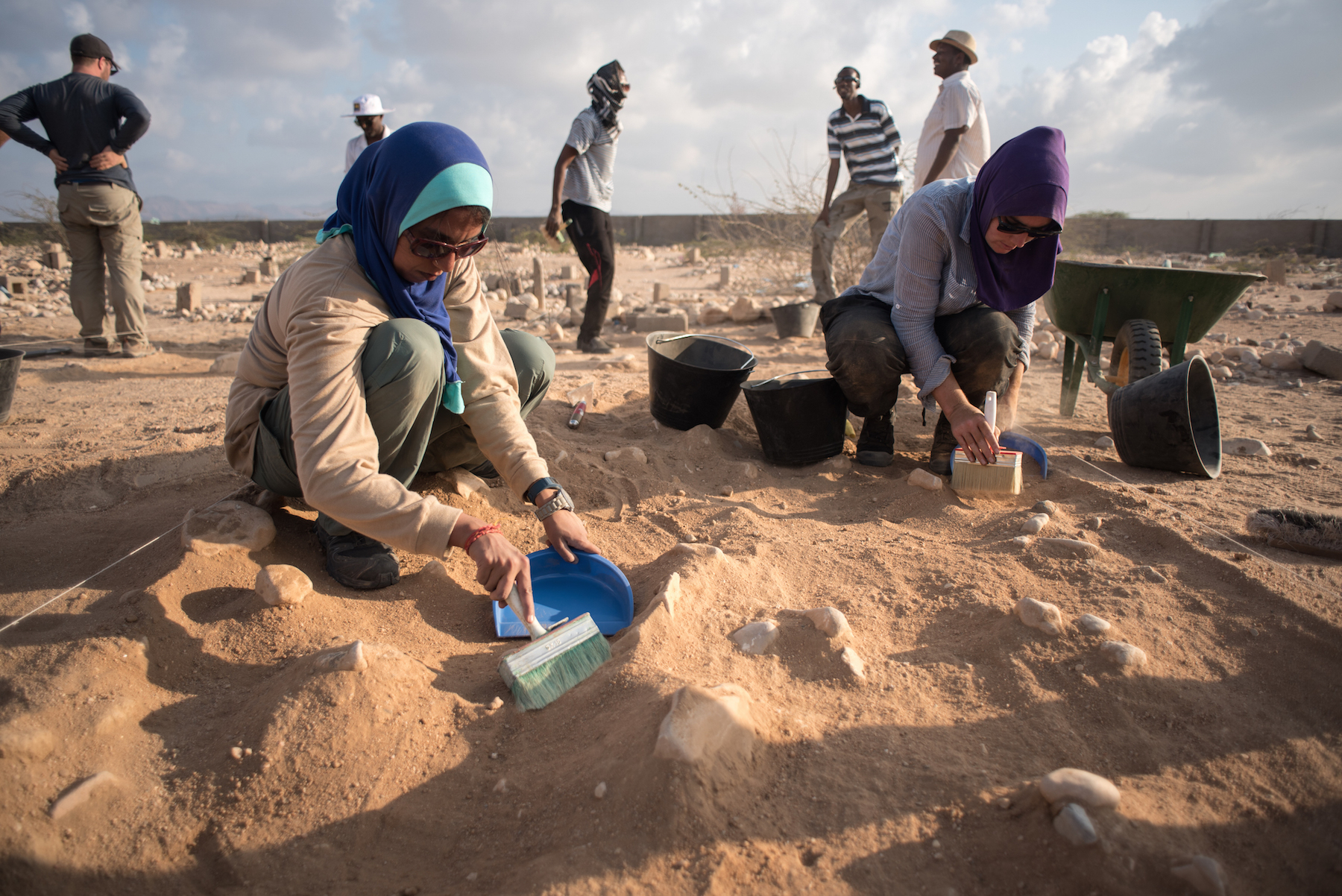
A forensic investigator brushes away soil from the top of a mass grave containing 17 bodies buried 30 years ago in Berbera

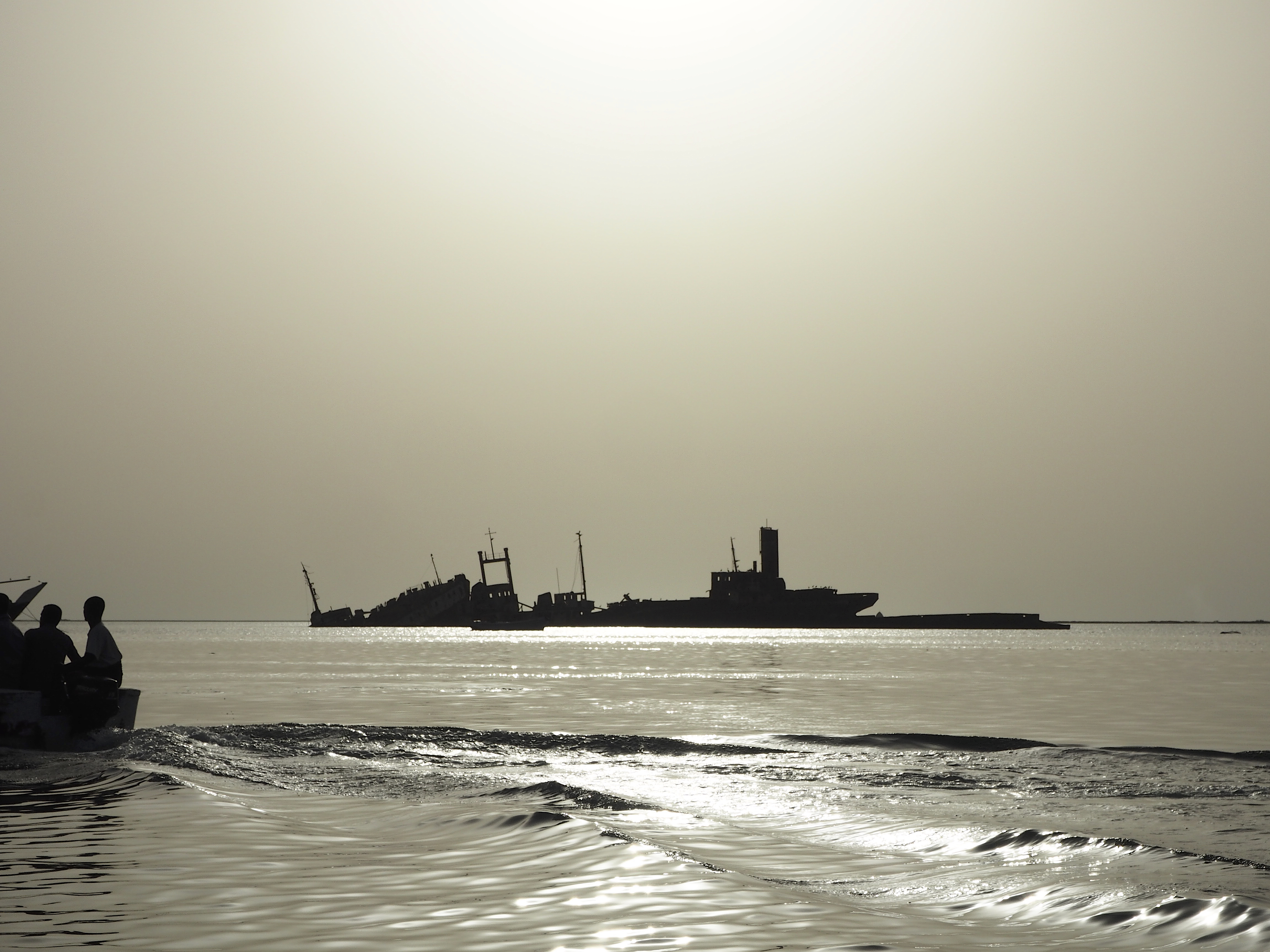
Hulks of ships sunk during Somaliland war for independence

Berbera, a city on the Red Sea coast, at the time the principal port of Somalia after Mogadishu, was also targeted by government troops. Atrocities committed in Berbera by the government against Isaaq civilians were especially brutal, Human Rights Watch reported that Berbera had suffered "some of the worst abuses of the war" even though the SNM had never launched an attack on Berbera like they did on Burao and Hargeisa.

Government attacks on Berbera included mass arrests, wanton killing of civilians, confiscation of civilian property, especially cars, luggage and food at the city's port, which were taken to Mogadishu. Modes of transport belonging to Isaaq civilians were confiscated by force, only military transport was allowed in the city.

==== Mass arrests ====
Immediately after the SNM attack on Burao, the government started a campaign of mass arrests in Berbera. Many Isaaq businessmen and elders were arrested as the government suspected they would support an SNM attack on Berbera.

Between 27 May and 1 June, planes which brought soldiers from Mogadishu carried Isaaq detainees on the return flight. The killing of detainees started when orders came from Mogadishu to cease the transfer of detainees. Arrests usually happened at night and were carried out by the Hangash forces.

==== Arrests and killings of Isaaq passengers on the ship "Emviyara" ====
On 21 June a ship called 'Emviyara' had docked at the port of Berbera. The passengers were Somalis deported from Saudi Arabia after being imprisoned there before the war broke out. They were deported due to accusations by Saudi authorities of irregularities in their residence documents. Human Rights Watch reports that "out of about 400 passengers, 29 men identified themselves as Isaaks. There were many others, but they claimed to be from other clans." The commander of the Hangash forces at Berbera and his deputy, Calas and Dakhare respectively, "sorted out the passengers according to their clan". Those confirmed to be Isaaq were taken to the Hangash compound where their belongings and money were confiscated. Some were severely tortured and had become permanently paralyzed as a result of the torture. Eight of the passengers detained were killed, the remaining 21 were imprisoned in Berbera and later released.

==== Mass killings ====
Atrocities committed by government forces in Berbera are especially notable because no fighting between government forces and SNM had taken place there, and as such the government had no pretext to commit atrocities against Isaaq civilians in Berbera (and other Isaaq settlements not attacked by SNM). According to Human Rights Watch the city had suffered "some of the worst abuses of the war even though the SNM never attacked Berbera".

As soon as news of the SNM's attack on Burao reached government authorities in Berbera, the city was completely blocked and hundreds of people were arrested. "More than 700 experienced worse deaths than had occurred elsewhere in the region." Methods of killing included the slitting of throats, getting strangled by wires, the cutting of the back of the neck, and getting severely disabled by beating with clubs before getting shot. The killings took place near the airport at a site about 10 kilometers from Berbera, and were conducted at night. The victims were killed in batches of 30–40. Most of them were men of fighting age that "the army feared would join the SNM," a few women were also among the victims.

Between June and the end of September, government forces as well as armed Ethiopian (Ogadeni) refugees continued to raid the immediate vicinity of Berbera as well as the villages between Berbera and Hargeisa. The attacks included the burning of villages, the killing of villagers, raping of women, confiscation of livestock and the arrest and detention of elders in Berbera. Some of these villages included Da'ar-buduq, which lies half-way between Hargeisa and Berbera; Dara-Godle, which lies 20 kilometers southwest of Berbera; Sheikh Abdal, near the central prison of Mandera; Dubato; Dala, located east of Mandera prison; and Lasa-Da'awo.

The genocide continued in Berbera as late into the conflict as August 1990, when a group of 20 civilians were executed by the military in reprisal for an SNM ambush that happened in Dubar, near Berbera, the incident demonstrated that "the genocide continued in Berbera longer than other cities."

===== Burning of Isaaq civilians in Berbera =====
Human Rights Watch's Africa Watch also reported the case of 11 Isaaq men, some of whom were nomads, being arrested by the government on the outskirts of Berbera. They were accused of helping the SNM. The Marine Commander of Berbera, Colonel Muse 'Biqil', along with two other senior military officers ordered the 11 nomads be burnt alive. The burnt nomads were buried in a spot about 10 kilometers east of Batalale, a communal beach and tourist spot in Berbera.

=== Erigavo ===
Like Berbera, Erigavo was an Isaaq inhabited city that the SNM did not attack, it has experienced no armed conflict between the SNM and the Somali army for at least several months, yet civilian Isaaqs have suffered both killings and arrests there at the hands of the army and other government forces.

The army started its campaign in Erigavo soon after the outbreak of fighting in Burao and Hargeisa. Hundreds of civilians were killed, and SNM forces did not reach that part of the country until 1989. One incident following a brief capture of the town in 1989 saw 60 Isaaq elders, who could not escape the city due to the difficult mountainous terrain, get taken out of their homes by government forces and were "shot by a firing squad against a wall of the public relations office". A number of large mass graves were found in Erigavo in 2012.

In January 1989, Oxfam Australia (at the time known as Community Aid Abroad), an aid agency which was based in Erigavo and ran a primary healthcare program for the Sanaag region, withdrew its program after operating for eight years in Somalia. It published a report "to draw attention to recent events in Somalia which have resulted in civil war, a huge refugee problem, persecution of a large section of the population along tribal lines and widespread human rights violations". The report denounced the "lack of basic freedom and human rights" in Somalia, which resulted in the agency's decision to leave Somalia due to what it described as a "drastic decline in security and human rights". The report noted that the agency's staff have reported "many violations of human rights for which they believe the Somali Government must take the main responsibility".

In describing the government's response to the SNM offensive, the report observed:

The government response to the attack has been particularly brutal and without regard to civilian casualties – in fact there is ample evidence that civilian casualties have been deliberately inflicted so as to destroy the support base of the SNM, which is composed mainly of people from the Isaaq tribe. Following the SNM attacks on the major towns of Hargeisa and Burao, government forces bombed the towns – causing over 400,000 people to flee the atrocities across the border into Ethiopia, where they are now located in refugee camps, living in appalling conditions, with inadequate water, food, shelter and medical facilities.

In Sanaag region access to villages by CAA staff was denied by the military and project resources such as vehicles and drugs misappropriated by government officials. This combined with poor security, made primary health work impossible and endangered the lives of staff, leading to a withdrawal by the agency. Project staff were frequently harassed by the military even when attending medical emergencies and on one occasion shots were fired.

Whilst human right have been deteriorating for some years in Somalia...we believe that the government must bear a particularly heavy responsibility for events over the last six months.

With regards to atrocities specific to Erigavo the report noted:

The military occupation of Erigavo has resulted in widespread suffering for the people of that area forcing many people flee to the bush including most of the population of Erigavo. It is believed that the military gave the elders of the village money in payment for boys as young as twelve and thirteen years of age. Untrained and disciplined, these youths were armed with AK47s and sent to patrol the town, unsure and ignorant of how to use their newly acquired power.

The report noted one case where a 13-year-old girl from Erigavo was raped by six government soldiers, it also stated that "looting, raping and bashing are commonplace." In a separate case, a man leaving Erigavo with money and food was "robbed, beaten and shot by the military". His body was then "dumped in the town and was eaten to the waist by hyenas".

In describing the Somali government policies in the region, Peter Kieseker, a spokesman for the CAA commented: "Genocide is the only word for it."

=== El Afweyne ===
In El Afweyn in the Sanaag region and its surrounding territory "over 300 persons were killed in October 1988 in revenge for the death of an army officer who was killed by a rebel-laid landmine."

Oxfam Australia (formerly known as Community Aid Abroad) described the situation in El Afweyn as follows:

It is known that many people have fled from the town of Elafweyn following bombing attacks by the government forces. A "scorched earth" policy applied to the villages in the Elafweyn plains. These displaced people are hiding in the bush without adequate access to food and medical supplies.

=== Sheikh ===
When news of the outbreak of fighting in Burao reached Sheikh, government-armed Ogadeni refugees in the area as well as the army units stationed there started to kill civilians and loot their homes. The government continued to commit atrocities in Sheikh despite the lack of SNM activity there. There were also widespread arrests of Isaaq men in the area, they were usually detained at a nearby military compound.

=== Mogadishu ===
The government's victimisation of the Isaaq was not limited to northern regions susceptible to SNM attacks. During the period of unrest in the north of the country, the government started arresting civilian Isaaq residents of the capital, Mogadishu. Those arrested Isaaqs included businessmen, Somali Airlines staff, army officers, employees of relief agencies, and civil servants. Similar to the case in Berbera, Erigavo, Sheikh and other towns in the north, there was no SNM activity in Mogadishu, moreover, Mogadishu was geographically removed from the situation in the north of the country due to its position in the southern regions, nevertheless the Somali government committed to its policy of persecution of Isaaq civilians in Mogadishu.

Over 300 Isaaq detainees were held the National Security Service headquarters, at Godka, another NSS facility (prison), at a military camp at Salaan Sharafta, at Laanta Bur Prison, a maximum security prison 50 kilometers from Mogadishu. They were taken out of their homes in Mogadishu in the middle of the night of 19 July 1989. Most of the detainees were released only after bribes were paid.

The small hotels of Mogadishu were searched by the government at night and their guests were sorted into Isaaqs and non-Isaaqs; the Isaaqs would then be subsequently detained.

On government orders, all Isaaq senior officials were proscribed from leaving the country for fear they would joining the SNM. One example of this is the case of Abdi Rageh, an Isaaq former military officer, was forcibly removed from a flight leaving for Frankfurt. Another example of this policy is the arrest of Omar Mohamed Nimalleh, a businessman and a former colonel in the police who was arrested at the airport on his way to Kenya on a business trip.

==== Jasiira beach massacre ====
On 21 July 1989, following religious disturbances that occurred a week earlier, 47 middle-class Isaaq men living in the capital city of Mogadishu were taken from their homes in the middle of the night, they were then transported to Jasiira, a communal beach west of Mogadishu and summarily executed. These men included professionals, businessmen, and teachers.

According to Claudio Pacifico, an Italian diplomat who at the time was the second in command at the Italian Embassy in Mogadishu and was present in the city at the time, it was the commander of the armoured division of the Somali army, General Ibrahim Ali Barre "Canjeex", who personally oversaw the midnight arrests of the Isaaq men and their transfer to Jasiira beach.

=== Attacks on Isaaq nomads by Ogadeni refugees in the countryside ===
The countryside was an area of operations for the government-armed Ethiopian (Ogadeni) refugees. Human Rights Watch reported that the refugees often "rampaged through villages and nomadic encampments near their numerous camps and claimed the lives of thousands of others, mostly nomads".

According to a foreign aid-agency official who was in the north after the fighting broke out:

the Siyad Barre government was so eager to arm the Ogaden refugees that it enlisted workers of the civilian National Refugee Commission – which administers the Ogaden refugee camps – to help distribute weapons... 'Now all the camps are heavily armed' an experienced western aid official said. Some of the camps' adult males are thought to have headed for the bush to avoid being drafted by the government... Many others are said to have accepted weapons from the government and left their camps in search of Isaaqs ... Recent travellers in the north added that many Ogaden Somalis from the UN refugee camps – and a fair number of another pro-government group, the Oromo, have been seen carrying American M-16 rifles.

The Ogadeni refugees formed militant groups that hunted Isaaq civilians around Bioley, Adhi-Adais, Saba'ad, Las-Dhureh, Daamka and Agabar refugee camps. In many cases, the Isaaq victims were left unburied "to be eaten by wild beasts".

=== Strafing of Isaaq refugees ===
Atrocities committed by the Barre's forces against Isaaqs included the strafing (i.e. machine gunning from aircraft) of fleeing refugees until they reached safety at the Ethiopian borders.

African historian Lidwien Kapteijns describes the ordeal of Isaaqs refugees fleeing their homes as follows:

Throughout this period, the whole civilian population appears to have become a target, in their homes and anywhere they sought refuge. Even during their long and harrowing exodus – on foot, without water or food, carrying the young and weak, giving birth on the way – across the border to Ethiopia, planes strafed them from the air.

Genocide scholar Adam Jones also discusses this particular aspect of the Siad Barre's campaign against the Isaaq:

In two months, from May to July 1988, between 50,000 and 100,000 people were massacred by the regime's forces. By then, any surviving urban Isaaks – that is to say, hundreds of thousands of members of the main northern clan community – had fled across the border into Ethiopia. They were pursued along the way by British-made fighter-bombers piloted by mercenary South African and ex-Rhodesian pilots, paid $2,000 per sortie.

Despite the government's continued refusal to grant international human rights organisations and foreign journalists access to the north to report on the situation, The New York Times reported the strafing of Isaaq refugees as part of its coverage of the conflict:

Western diplomats here said they believed that the fighting in Somalia, which has gone largely unreported in the West, was continuing unabated. More than 10,000 people were killed in the first month after the conflict began in late May, according to reports reaching diplomats here. The Somali Government has bombed towns and strafed fleeing residents and used artillery indiscriminately, according to the officials.

=== Use of mercenaries by the Somali government ===
In addition to using both air and ground military capabilities against the Isaaq, the Somali government also hired South African and Rhodesian mercenaries to fly and maintain its fleet of British Hawker Hunter aircraft and carry out bombing missions over Isaaq cities.

In addition to the "systematic destruction of Isaaq dwellings, settlements and water points", bombing raids were conducted on major cities in the northwest regions inhabited mainly by Isaaq on orders of President Barre.

The Guardian reported the brutal campaign by the Somali government against the Isaaq:

Hundred of Thousands of people have been killed, dispersed or bombed out of their homes in northern Somalia after government military operations which Western aid workers say are little short of genocide.

The action has been concentrated on the three northern towns of Hargeisa, Berbera and Burao where some 20,000 people are believed to have died in recent bombing raids by the government ... Many thousands of others are being systematically denied food because Somali forces are deliberately holding up essential supplies. Aid officials said that up to 800,000 people – almost all of them Issaq nomads – have been displaced as a result of the civil war. A quarter of these, and possibly as many as 300,000, were now struggling to survive in wretched conditions in refugee camps in Ethiopia while a similar number had been forced to leave Africa. The fate of those who can no longer be traced remains largely unknown.

... Until about eight months ago, the urbanised population of Issaqi were concentrated in Hargeisa, Berbera and Burao. Although few journalists have been authorised to visit the area, tens of thousands of people are understood to have died during a series of bombing raids on the towns last August conducted mainly by mercenaries recruited in Zimbabwe.

... "they just bombed and bombed and bombed," an [aid] agency man, recently returned from Somalia said. Hargeisa which originally had a population of 350,000, was 70 percent destroyed, Burao was "devastated" in the same raids.

Issaqis who survived the bombings are said to have been rounded up in the streets by Somali troops and summarily shot. Mass graves have since been found as well as corpses which were left to rot in the streets where they fell.

The people now living in the three towns are believed to be totally non-Issaqi or military personnel who have been deputed to guard what has been retaken from the SNM.

=== Government use of land-mines ===
A particularly enduring aspect of the conflict was the Somali government's use of anti-personnel land-mines in Isaaq cities. An emblematic aspect of Siad Barre's government's "policy of genocide towards the Issak group of clans" was the laying of "over one-million unmarked mines, booby traps and other lethal devices in the Northern Region..." over the duration of the conflict. The exact number of land-mines is unknown but estimated to be between one and two million, most of them planted in what was then known as northern Somalia.

The anti-personnel mines were used to target Isaaq civilians returning to cities and towns as they were planted in "streets, houses and livestock thoroughfares to kill, maim and deter return". Most of the mines were "scattered across pastoral lands or hidden near water holes or on secondary roads and former military installations".

In February 1992, Physicians for Human Rights sent a medical team to the region to examine the scale of the problem of land-mines left over from the 1988–1991 conflict, they have described the situation as follows:

They [mines] are most prevalent in the countryside surrounding two of Somaliland's principal cities, Hargeisa and Burao, and in the pastoral and agricultural lands west of Burao. Now that the civil war has ended, the victims of mines have been principally civilians, many of whom are women and children.

The Somali army mined and blew up many of Hargeisa's principal buildings such as "the Union Hotel and a private maternity clinic near the Sha'ab girls School", this was done in an attempt to clear the area between them and the SNM. Residential properties which were near important government offices were also blown up.

The Somalia Handbook for U.S. armed forces notes that "the landmine problem in Somalia can be described as a general problem in the southern sectors of Somalia and a very serious problem in the northern sectors." In describing the prevalence of land-mines especially in the countryside surrounding cities inhabited by Isaaq, the Somalia Handbook states, "Large patterned minefields, exceeding 100,000 mines have been emplaced in sections surrounding the city. Extensive boobytrap activity has also been reported from Hargeysa."

==== Mining of grazing and agricultural land ====
The use of land-mines by government forces against civilians was especially damaging in this particular region due to majority of Isaaqs (and other northern Somalis) being pastoral nomads, reliant on the grazing of sheep, goats, and camels. A report commissioned by the Vietnam Veterans of America Foundation describes the ramifications of this tactic as follows:

The Siad Barre government also mined rural areas to disrupt the economy and the nomadic population, who were seen as the base of support of the SNM. Agarey, Jajabod, Dalqableh, Ubaaleh, Adadley and Farjano-Megasta were affected. Dry-season grazing land and areas close to permanent water sources at higher elevation were particularly hard hit. There are landmines at such high-altitude grazing areas between Burao and Erigavo. Large areas of grazing land in Zeyla were also mined... One consequence of landmines was the cessation of sheep exports to Saudi Arabia and Yemen.

One of the most densely mined areas in the north were the agricultural settlements around Gabiley and Arabsiyo. It is reported that thousands of people were affected by mining in that area, by either abandoning their farmlands entirely due to land-mines or by severe restrictions on farming due to the presence of mines in their fields or the roads network.

==== Mining of civilian homes ====
Physicians for Human Rights describe one tactic employed by Barre's troops used in their campaign against the Isaaq people of the north:

One of the cruelest – and clearly unlawful – tactics used by Siad Barre's troops was the deliberate mining of civilian homes. In 1988, government forces shelled and bombed the capital of Hargeisa. Before fleeing, many residents buried their valuables in holes dug in the floors or courtyards of their homes. Upon discovering these stashes, soldiers removed the jewellery and other valuables and placed booby-traps or mines in these hiding places. After the fighting ceased, many of those who had fled returned to their homes in the first months of 1991 only to be injured or killed by these hidden explosives... Some families were said to be squatting outside their houses because they were afraid to enter.

... Siad Barre's forces deliberately mined wells and grazing lands in an effort to kill and terrorize nomadic herders whom the army viewed as protectors of the SNM. While direct evidence is not available, most observers agree that Siad Barre's forces undertook this extensive mining to prevent resettlement by the predominantly Isaak nomads and agriculturists.

The British mine-clearing company Rimfire, contracted by the United Nations High Commissioner for Refugees to conduct de-mining activities has identified land-mines from 24 different countries in Somalia. The majority were from the Czech Republic, Russia, Pakistan and Belgium.

==== Use of land-mines at water sources ====
The Barre government also mined water sources during its campaign against Isaaq civilians. This was especially harsh due to region's semi-arid climate and frequent water shortages. Hargeisa's main water supply, the Gedebley reservoir and its pumping station, were surrounded with minefields by the government. The deep water wells at Sab'ad refugee camp was also surrounded by a minefield. A report published by Mines Advisory Group noted, "At Ina Guha, 42 out of 62 small water reservoirs were mined and unusable". At Tur Debe, government forces destroyed wells by using mines as demolition explosives. The water well at Selel-Derajog was "destroyed and cemented over by government forces...". Similarly "all water sources in Dalqableh were mined, as was the main watering point for nomads between Qorilugud and Qabri Huluul. Water reservoirs at War Ibraan and Beli Iidlay were mined."

=== Reported acquisition of chemical weapons ===
During the government campaign against the Isaaq in 1988 and 1989, numerous credible reports by the US and international media reported that Somalia had received shipments of chemical weapons from Libya. NBC News reported a story on 12 January 1989 that the Reagan Administration "had information eight months earlier that Libyan President Muammar Gaddafi gave Somalia chemical weapons". The US State Department denied the account, but NBC stood by its story when questioned by a Congressional office. Two weeks later, on 25 January The Washington Post reported that the government of Gen. Mohammed Siad Barre "is stockpiling chemical weapons in warehouses near its capital, Mogadishu". These reports state that canisters of the nerve gases Soman and Sarin were unloaded from a Libyan Airlines civilian flight to Mogadishu on 7 October. The British Foreign Secretary Geoffrey Howe stated that the British Government was "deeply concerned" about authoritative reports that chemical weapons had been received in Somalia. The Somali government, represented by Prime Minister Mohammad Ali Samatar has denied possession of chemical weapons.

== Fall of Barre's regime ==
By June 1989, the SNM was actively mounting attacks on major hubs across the North-West, blockading transport routes and interfering with regime supplies to military garrisons. As a result, the Barre regime gradually lost control of the area by December 1989 with exception to major towns which were under active siege by the SNM. The SNM captured Zeila in April 1989 (severing Somalia's land connection with Djibouti), as well as the coastal towns of Heis, Maydh and Bulhar in late August 1989. The SNM had earlier also captured the border town of Buhodle, on the Somali-Ethiopian border. On 5 December 1989, the SNM announced that they have taken control of Hargeisa, and that same month all Somali army units in northern Somalia were cut off from their bases, only being able to contact Mogadishu by radio, boat or plane. On 3 April 1990, the SNM captured Lughaya and Loyada.

By early 1990, it was clear that the Barre regime had lost control of large parts of the northern regions, and it was at this point that the Dhulbahante, at the instigation of their premier Garad, Abdiqani Garad Jama, renewed contact with Habar Je’lo members of the SNM, and, in a series of meetings in the towns of Qararro, Gowlalaale, Dannood and Gaashaamo in Togdheer and in the Haud and Ogadeen areas of Ethiopia, they agreed a ceasefire. Garad Abdiqani had long been sympathetic to the SNM's cause and had earlier approached them asking that he be permitted to join as a Dhulbahante member. His request was declined and generated some discussion on whether members should be permitted as representatives of non-Isaaq clans, or only as individuals. However, this initial approach did open avenues of communication for his later initiative. At any rate, talks between the Dhulbahante and SNM continued in Oog after the fall of the regime at the start of 1991, and both parties agreed to take part in a ceasefire conference in the latter half of February 1991, in the port town of Berbera, to which all the main northern clans would be invited.

Over the subsequent few years, the SNM would exert control of the vast majority of northwestern Somalia and expanded its operations to approximately 50 km east of Erigavo, the administrative seat of the Sanaag region. Although it never gained full control of major cities including Hargeisa, Burao and Berbera but resorted to laying siege on them. By the beginning of 1991, the SNM succeeded in taking control of northwestern Somalia including Hargeisa and other regional capitals.

By mid-1990, United Somali Congress (USC) rebels, which were allied to the SNM, had captured most towns and villages surrounding Mogadishu, the Somalian capital, which prompted some to give Barre the ironic title 'Mayor of Mogadishu.' In December the USC entered Mogadishu. Four weeks of battle between Barre's remaining troops and the USC ensued, during which the USC brought more forces into the city. By January 1991, USC rebels defeated the Red Berets in the process toppling Barre's government. The remainder of the government's forces then finally collapsed. Siad Barre himself escaped from his palace towards the Kenyan border in a tank. Many of the opposition groups subsequently began competing for influence in the power vacuum that followed the ouster of Barre's regime. In the south, armed factions led by USC commanders General Mohamed Farah Aidid and Ali Mahdi Mohamed, in particular, clashed as each sought to exert authority over the capital.

On 21 January the SNM captured Sheikh and Burao, and 9 days later the SNM captured Berbera. By 23 January the SNM controlled Somaliland's major cities and by 4 February, SNM's control extended to the entire north of Somalia, and all prisoners and pro-government ex-soldiers were released and ordered to return to their regions of origin (mainly Ethiopia), except for Hawiye ex-soldiers and ex-civil servants, who were permitted to remain in Burao since their lives would have been at risk if they had traveled through hostile pro-Barre country on their return to Mogadishu.

=== Battle of Dilla and the capture of Awdal ===
Throughout the war the Gadabursi clan in the western Awdal region of Somaliland had been fighting on Barre's side against the SNM, with the Barre regime arming them and encouraging them to undertake reprisals against the Isaaq. Therefore, when the SNM reached Awdal in early 1991, local civilians were concerned that the Gadabursi and the Issa would be fighting the neighbouring Jibril Abokor sub-division of the Sa'ad Musa/Habr Awal, and that they wanted revenge.

In January 1991, in one of the final acts of the war, the 99th division of the SNM led by Colonel Ibrahim Koodbuur had pursued government forces that fled from Hargeisa to the town of Dilla. After a ferocious battle, the SNM captured the town and then continued into the main Gadabursi town of Borama. However, because the SNM leadership believed that the Gadabursi wished to seek peace, they withdrew their units after a mere 24 hours to allow discussions to take place without the shadow of occupation. This was eased by the fact that a highranking commander of the SNM present in Awdal, Abdirahman Aw Ali (nicknamed Tolwaa), was Gadabursi himself, of the Rer Jibril Yunis subclan.

The difficult situation in Borama was exacerbated by hunger and food shortages. When Abdirahman Aw Ali entered his hometown of Borama, the people saw the SNM forces as the best solution to the unbearable situation in the town. As part of alleviating the food shortage in Borama, Abdirahman Aw Ali, in collaboration with clan elders, ordered that the shopkeepers reopen their stores and sell their commodities at an affordable price. Before, they had closed in the hope of raising the prices of the dry rations.

Most locals in Borama were armed and ready to fight, including members of the pro-Barre Gadabursi militant group, the Somali Democratic Alliance (or SDA for short), armed Oromos, and several Gadabursi subclans. The confidence of the SNM however was rewarded when a brief initial meeting in mid-February in Tulli, just outside Borama, agreed that Gadabursi delegates would attend a larger peace conference in Berbera and then resume bilateral talks immediately after that meeting had finished, this time in Borama itself.

==== Zeila ====
In the late 1980s, the Issa of Awdal region, led by Abdirahman Dualeh Ali, a former SNM leader, formed the United Somali Front (USF). The militia was discreetly supported and remotely controlled by current Djiboutian president Ismail Omar Guelleh, then head of the Djibouti secret service and the nephew of former president Hassan Gouled Aptidon. The USF, armed with small arms, engaged in preparation for the secession of this westernmost region of Somaliland. In a meeting of high-ranking Issa clan elders in January 1990, the annexation of Zeila and Lughaya to Djibouti was considered an imperative objective. Influential Issa politicians envisioned a Greater Djibouti or "Issa-land", where Djibouti's borders would extend from the Red Sea to Dire Dawa.

On 9 February 1991, the SNM clashed with USF forces on the Djiboutian border, with the USF forces, backed by former Somalian regulars, occupying the western parts of Awdal region with the goal of annexing Zeyla to Djibouti. An SNM delegation led by SNM chairman Abdirahman Ahmed Ali Tuur subsequently went to Djibouti, where they were told by Hassan Guled Aptidon and his Secret Service Chief Ismail Omar Guelleh that the SNM should recognize its control over the Zeyla-Loyada-Garissa area.

The SNM chairman rejected their claims and refused to comply, and took military action against the USF soldiers, which were swiftly routed and violently crushed. The Issa component sought safety in Djibouti, while the former Siad Barre soldiers, who were primarily from the Majerteen and Ogaden clans of the Darod, were transported by sea to Bosaso, where they joined the newly resurgent Somali Salvation Democratic Front (SSDF).

=== Situation in Sanaag ===
The SNM had always maintained a significant presence in the Sanaag region, being mainly based in the wide Isaaq-inhabited areas of the western and central parts of the region. The SNM had long maintained a small fleet consisting of armed speed boats that operated from the ports of Maydh and Xiis. On 16 March 1989, SNM forces captured and held Erigavo, the administrative seat of the Sanaag region, for three hours before leaving the town. Despite an agreement between Somalian authorities and Isaaq elders that the Somalian military would not engage in reprisals against the civilian population, the Somalian army reportedly bombarded the town and then went in, killing an estimated 500 remaining members of the Isaaq clan. A woman who had visited the town the following month, and who was interviewed by Africa Watch in London, described the incident:

I was told that the SNM had attacked the town at the end of March and killed a lot of soldiers; the militias had fled; two days later, the militias returned and killed a lot of Isaak civilians. People were apparently shot even inside mosques. There are mass graves everywhere. I left Erigavo on 23 July

By March 1991, the SNM had seized control over the Sanaag region, including its administrative seat of Erigavo. Erigavo was at the hands of the Habr Yunis and the Habr Je'lo clans of the Isaaq clan family, with the local Darod minority consisting of the Warsangeli and the Dhulbahante fleeing the town back to their territories for security reasons given that their side had lost the war. The Sanaag region, in the far east of the country, was the last region to be liberated from the forces of Siad Barre. The situation there was conflict-prone since during the years of unity the Isaaq who lived in the east had been deprived of their lands, with many of them demanding these lands be returned. Gerard Prunier wrote in his book The Country That Does Not Exist:

When I reached Erigavo in March 1991 the town was in the hands of two Issaq clans, the Habr Yunis and the Habr Ja’alo. The two local Darood clans, the Dhulbahante and the Warsangeli, had retreated to their territory for security reasons since it was their side which had lost the war. The clans were separated by a thin band of people called Sharubo Libaax (the lion's whiskers) There was also a group called Gaadishi, armed men who moved in the bush and attacked their enemies by surprise. They came from all clans and had no political aims. Their purpose was only looting. Some SNM regiments also took part in the looting because they said now it was their turn. But the Issaq elders did not want this to continue. They maintained that since Siad Barre and his supporters had committed crimes against us and we had consequently taken up arms, therefore this was the reason why we should not be committing the same crimes against them after we defeated them in the war

— Gérard Prunier, The Country That Does Not Exist

== Declaration of independence ==
=== The Northern Peace Process ===
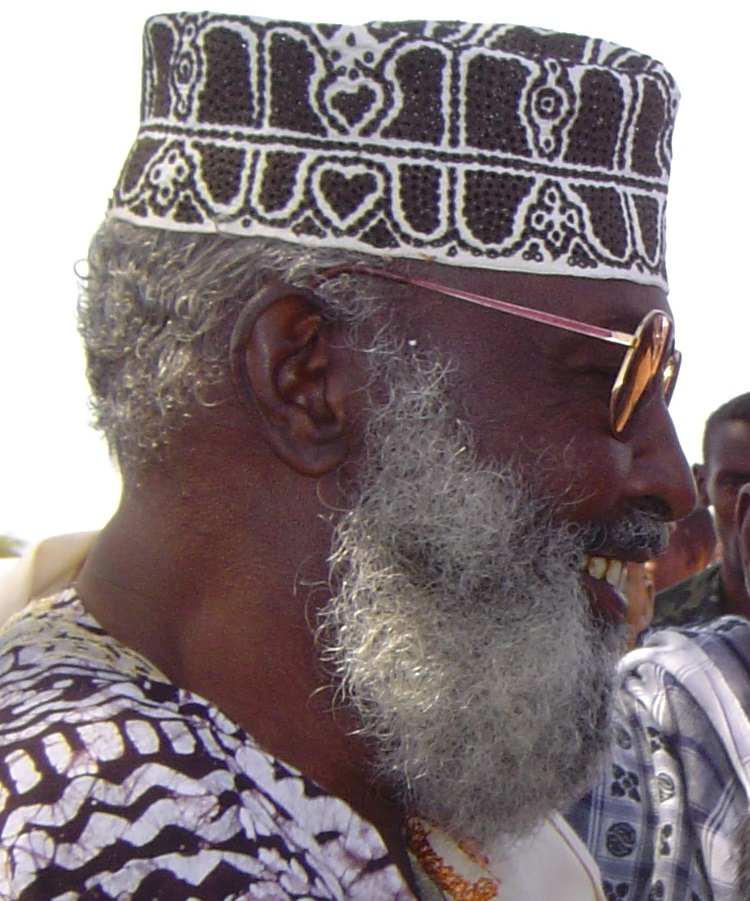
Garaad Cabdiqani of the Dhulbahante who tabled the case for succession

With explicit bilateral ceasefire agreements in place with the Gadabuursi and Dhulbahante and implicit acceptance of the situation by the Issa and Warsangeli, the next step was to consolidate these agreements and to move on to a collective discussion on the creation of an administrative capacity.

After the SNM was able to exert control over northwestern Somalia, the organisation quickly opted for a cessation of hostilities and reconciliation with non-Isaaq communities. A peace conference occurred in Berbera between 15 and 21 February 1991 to restore trust and confidence between northern communities whereby the SNM leadership had talks with representatives from the Issa, Gadabursi, Dhulbahante and Warsangeli clans. This was especially the case since non-Isaaq communities were said to have been largely associated with Barre's regime and fought on opposing side of the Isaaq.

This conference laid the foundation for the "Grand Conference of the Northern Clans" which occurred in Burao between 27 April and 18 May 1991 which aimed to bring peace to northern Somalia. After extensive consultations amongst clan representatives and the SNM leadership, it was agreed that Northern Somalia (formerly State of Somaliland) would revoke its voluntary union with the rest of Somalia to form the "Republic of Somaliland". Although there were hopes amongst of Northern communities for secession as early as 1961, the SNM did not have a clear policy on this matter from the onset. However, any nationalistic objectives amongst SNM members and supporters was abruptly altered in light of the genocide experienced under the Barre regime. As a result, strengthening the case for secession and reclamation of independence to the territory of State of Somaliland. Garad Cabdiqani Garaad Jama who led the Dhulbahante delegation was first to table the case for succession.

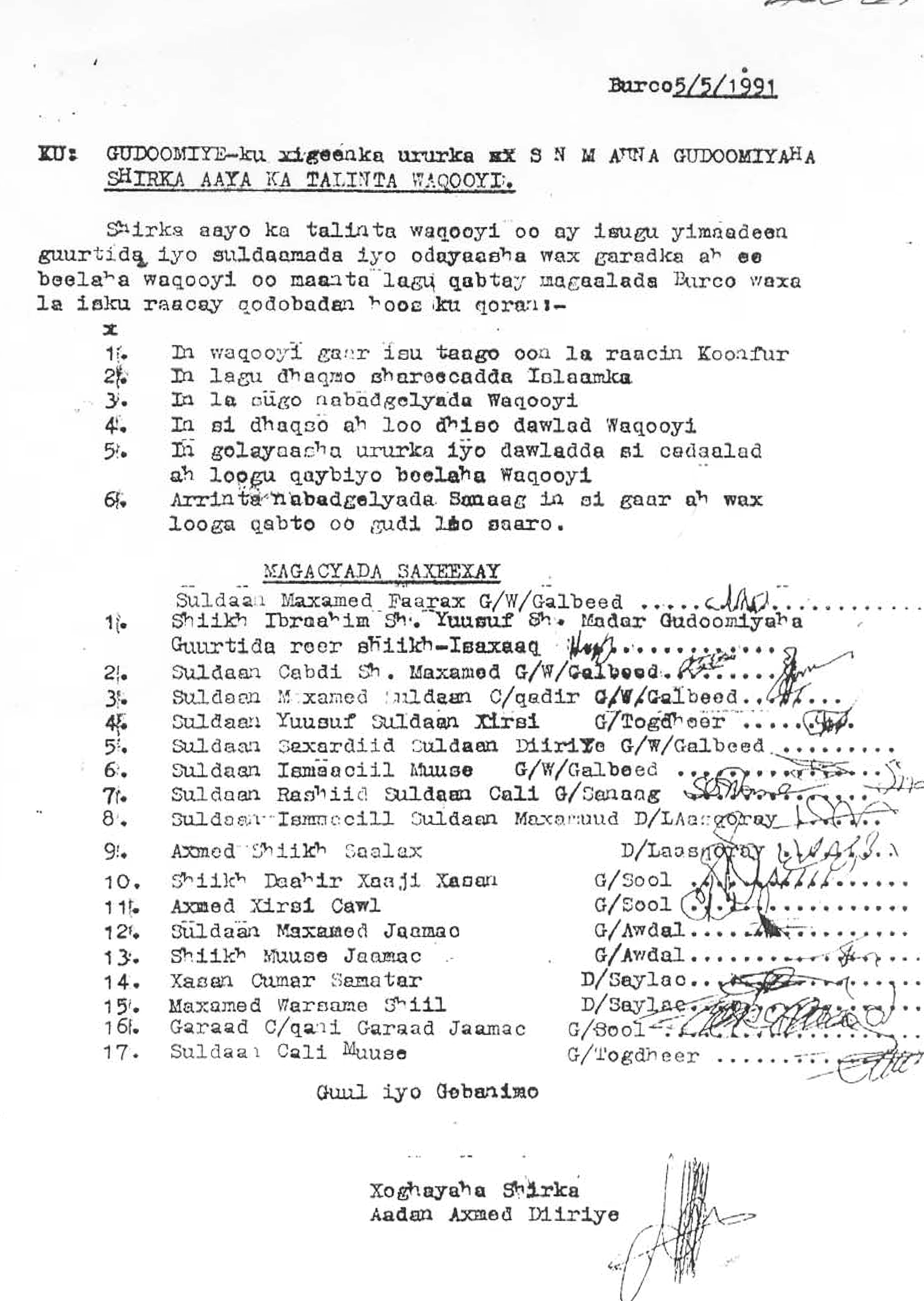
5 May resolution of the Burao grand conference. At the second national meeting on 18 May, the SNM Central Committee, with the support of a meeting of elders representing the major clans in the Northern Regions, declared the restoration of the Republic of Somaliland in the territory of the former British Somaliland protectorate and formed a government for the self-declared state.

=== The Declaration of Independence ===
In May 1991, the SNM announced the independence of "Somaliland" and the formation of an interim administration whereby Abdirahman Ahmed Ali Tuur was elected to govern for a period of two years. Many former SNM members were key in the formation of the government and constitution.

In May 1993 the "Borama Conference" took place to elect a new president and Vice President. The conference was attended by 150 elders from the Isaaq (88), Gadabursi (21), Dhulbahante (21), Warsengali (11) and Issa (9) communities and was endorsed by the SNM. As a result, the conference granted the government of Somaliland local legitimacy beyond the realms of the Isaaq dominated SNM, especially since the town of Borama was predominantly inhabited by the Gadabursi.

At this conference, the delegates agreed to establish an executive president and a bicameral legislature whereby Somaliland's second president Muhammad Haji Egal was elected. Egal would be re-elected for a second term in 1997.

== Post-war independence ==
Abdirahman Ahmed Ali Tuur became the newly established Somaliland polity's first president, but subsequently renounced the separatist platform in 1994 and began instead to publicly seek and advocate reconciliation with the rest of Somalia under a power-sharing federal system of governance. Muhammad Haji Ibrahim Egal was elected as Tuur's successor in 1993 by the Grand Conference of National Reconciliation in Borama, which met for four months, leading to a gradual improvement in security, as well as a consolidation of the new territory. Egal was reappointed in 1997, and remained in power until his death on 3 May 2002. The vice-president, Dahir Riyale Kahin, who was during the 1980s the highest-ranking National Security Service (NSS) officer in Berbera in Siad Barre's government, was sworn in as president shortly afterward. In 2003, Kahin became the first elected president of Somaliland, winning the 2003 Somaliland presidential election, and would serve as president until 2010 when Ahmed Mohamed Mohamoud, the longest serving SNM chairman (1984–1990) won the 2010 Somaliland presidential election. Ahmed was then later succeeded by Muse Bihi Abdi after Muse won the 2017 Somaliland presidential election, who remains the fifth president of Somaliland. Despite Somaliland maintaining full sovereignty of its claimed territory and having all the trappings of an independent state it is internationally considered to be part of Somalia.

Since 1991, the territory has been governed by democratically elected governments that seek international recognition as the government of the Republic of Somaliland. The central government maintains informal ties with some foreign governments, who have sent delegations to Hargeisa. Ethiopia also maintains a trade office in the region. As of 26 December 2025, Israel is the only United Nations member state that recognises the Republic of Somaliland as an independent sovereign state. It is a member of the Unrepresented Nations and Peoples Organization, an advocacy group whose members consist of indigenous peoples, minorities and unrecognised or occupied territories.
