= UFFO Group =

Civic movement in Hargeisa (1981–1982)

Hargeisa Hospital Group (Uffo)
- Uffo
- Flag raised by members of UFFO in Hargeisa, 26 June 1981.
- Other name: RUDM (Men who own the City)
- Founded: Early 1981
- Dates active: 1981 – 20 February 1982
- Dissolved: 1982
- Merged into: Somali National Movement (partially)
- Country: Somaliland
- Group: Local people
- Newspaper: UFFO Magazine
- Active regions: Hargeisa

The Hargeisa Hospital Group, more commonly known as the UFFO Group, was an Isaaq voluntary service movement in Hargeisa, then Somalia (now Somaliland), that was formed in 1981 by Isaaq intellectuals in response to government neglect of the Northern Regions. Nicknamed "Uffo", which in Somali means "the wind before the storm", the voluntary service group consisted mostly of young professionals from the diaspora who had been educated and worked overseas. The group undertook voluntary public-service activities in Hargeisa, particularly in the provision of healthcare and other community services, and later published magazines and newspapers that were critical of the regime's neglect of the northern territories of the former British Somaliland. Its activities brought it into conflict with the Somali government, which subsequently arrested and prosecuted most of its members. Their arrest and subsequent Hargeisa Uprising that followed in 1982 is widely believed to have been the trigger of the Somaliland War of Independence.
