= Misraq Gashamo =

Woreda in the Somali Region of Ethiopia

Misraq Gashamo Degmada misraq gaashaamo
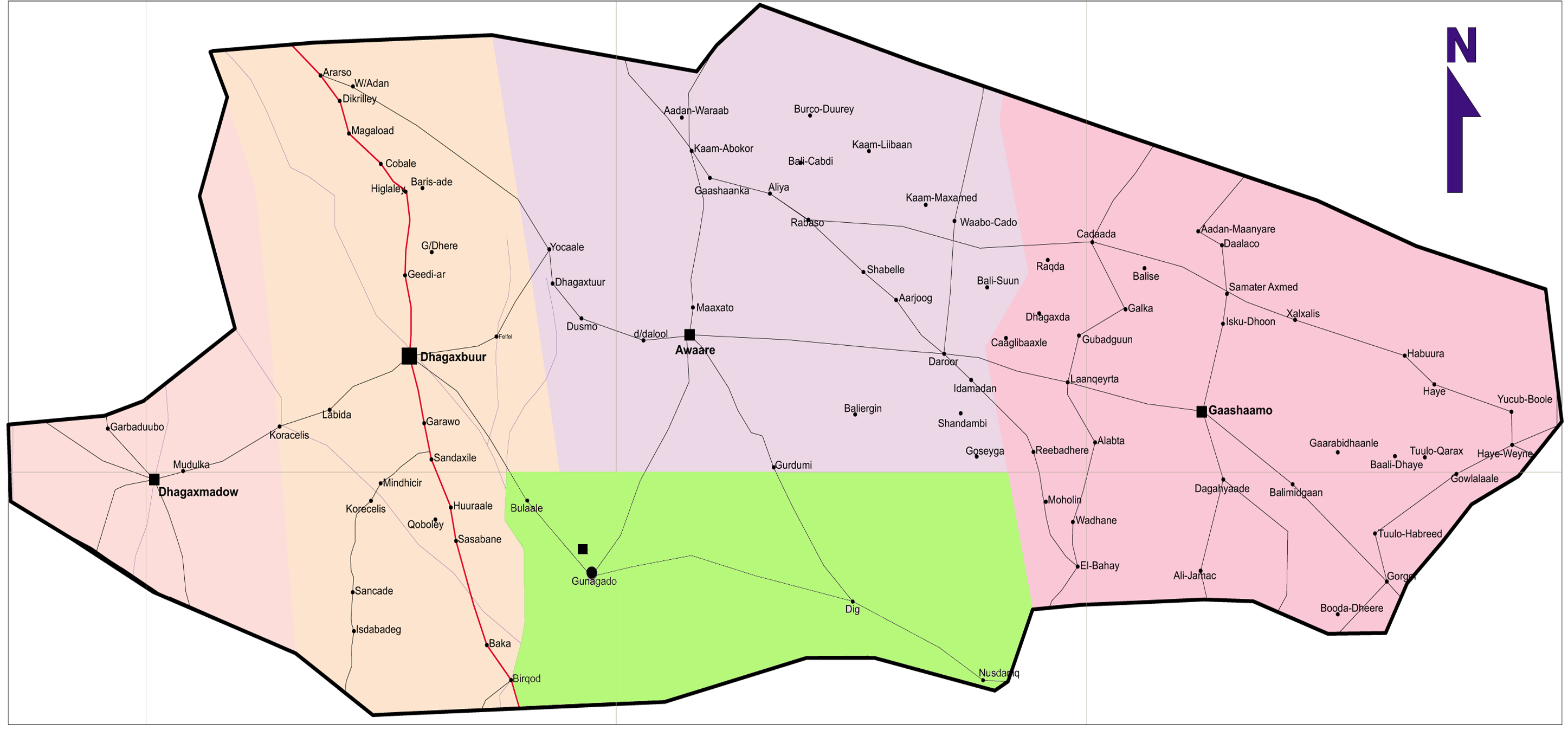

- Location within Ethiopia
- Coordinates: 8°12′N 45°25′E
- Country: Ethiopia
- Region: Somali
- Zone: Jarar zone
- Districts: Gaashaamo
- Elevation: 807 m (2,648 ft)
- Time zone: UTC+3 (EAT)

Misraq Gashamo is one of the woredas in the Somali Region of Ethiopia. Part of the Jarar Zone, it is bordered on the south by the Werder Zone, on the southwest by Gunagadow, on the west by Aware, and on the north by Somaliland; it is frequently considered part of the Haud. The biggest town and capital of this district is Gashamo. The district is named after the town.

== History ==
Before 1960, there was no water available during the dry season in Misraq Gashamo; the pastures in the woreda were traditionally abandoned by the local nomadic pastoralists for areas with abundant water with the advent of the dry season, like Burco in Somaliland. In the years after 1960 the construction of private birkas (underground concrete water tanks), which greatly increased after 1970; by 1998 there were 128 clusters of birkas, each cluster corresponding to the number of permanent or semi-permanent settlements in the woreda. By the 1980s, pastoralists grazing in Misraq Gashamo had all but stopped the trek to Burco and other wells in the dry season. While this allowed the area that was previously grazed mainly in the wet season to now be grazed throughout the dry season, it has also led to a serious decline in the native species most favored for fodder and grazing in this woreda.

== Demographics ==
Based on the 2007 Census conducted by the Central Statistical Agency of Ethiopia (CSA), this woreda has a total population of 95,191, of whom 52,645 are men and 42,546 women. While 6,659 or 7% are urban inhabitants, a further 20,583 or 21.62% are pastoralists. 98.72% of the population said they were Muslim. This woreda is inhabited by the Habr Yunis and the Habr Je'lo clans, both clans form part of the Isaaq clan family.

The 1994 national census reported a total population for this woreda of 72,574, of whom 39,596 were men and 32,978 were women; 5,231 or 7.21% were urban inhabitants. The largest ethnic group reported in Misraq Gashamo was the Somali people (99.98%).

== Cities and towns ==
- Gashamo
- Daroor
- Gowlalaale
- Haye Bari
- Tuulo Habreed
