= Haye Bari =

- Location within Ethiopia
- Coordinates: 8.041°N 45.913°E
- Country: Ethiopia
- Region: Somali
- Zone: Jarar zone
- Districts: Misraq Gashamo
- Elevation: 807 m (2,648 ft)
- Time zone: UTC+3 (EAT)

Haye Bari is a town in the Misraq Gashamo woreda, in the Somali Region of Ethiopia. It is mainly populated by the Reer Yuusuf sub-division of the Habr Je'lo Isaaq.
