= Tuulo Habreed =

- Location within Ethiopia
- Coordinates: 7.88°N 45.61°E
- Country: Ethiopia
- Region: Somali
- Zone: Jarar zone
- Districts: Misraq Gashamo
- Elevation: 807 m (2,648 ft)
- Time zone: UTC+3 (EAT)

Tuulo Habreed is a town in the Misraq Gashamo woreda, in the Somali Region of Ethiopia. The town is inhabited by the Habr Je'lo clan, part of the wider Isaaq clan-family.
