= Battle of Burco-Duuray =

Military engagement during the Somaliland War of Independence

Burco-Duuray Offensive
- Part of the Somaliland War of Independence and Ethiopian Civil War
Date	17 October 1984
Location	Burco-duuray, Jarar Zone, Ethiopia
Result	SNA victory

Belligerents
SNM	Somalia

Commanders and leaders
Mohamed Hashi Lihle †	General Hashi Gani

Strength
~400 fighters	~1,000 soldiers 70 technical vehicles

Casualties and losses
27 fighters killed (including Mohammed Hashi Lihle)	170 soldiers 17 military vehicles

The Burco-Duuray offensive (Somali: Gudogalkii Burco Duuray}) was a confrontation during the Somaliland War of Independence, fought on 17 October 1984 between the Somali National Movement and the Somali National Army near Burco-duuray in the Jarar Zone of Ethiopia. The SNM, led by Mohamed Hashi Lihle, launched an offensive with around 600 fighters against armed SNA garrison. In this offensive Hashi Lihle was killed in the action and the SNM were defeated.

== The Battle ==
The SNA had intelligence and were anticipating that the SNM were going to attack Burco Duuray 78 hours prior to the attack. Gerrard Prunier writes this was decisive mistake from the SNM

On 17 October 1984,the SNM launched a coordinated assault aiming to destabilize government control. However, government forces, bolstered by superior firepower and local intelligence, decisively repelled the offensive. The SNM fighters were routed, suffering considerable casualties and retreating in disarray.

The defeat at Burco-Duuray marked one of the earliest and most devastating setbacks for the SNM in its formative years. The outcome of the battle was instrumental in delaying further insurgent advances in the north and demonstrated the Somali government’s continued military capacity during that period.

Gerrard Prunier:

The SNA had known for the last 78 hours about our coming, and when the engagement took place at Burco Duuray, we were defeated and we suffered many casualties. Our commander, the famous Colonel Lixle, was killed on 17 October. This was our worst disaster, ever.?? When SNM chairman Silanyo learned the news, he said: 'Now if Lixle is dead, we all have to be like Lixle? But it was easier said than done.

The SNM lost 27 fighters, including their commander, Mohammed Hashi Lihle, a major blow to the movement.

== Aftermath ==
The loss of Mohammed Hashi Lihle was a major setback for the SNM leadership, future Somaliland president Silanyo remarked that ''if Lixle is dead, we have to all be like Lixle''. The battle become a national holiday for Somaliland to commemorate the fallen SNM rebels that were killed.
