= Gunagadow =

Predominantly Somali district in Ethiopia

Gunagadow is one of the woredas in the Somali Region of Ethiopia. Part of the Degehabur Zone, Gunagadow is bordered on the south by the Korahe Zone, one the west by Degehabur, on the north by Aware, and on the east by Misraq Gashamo. Gunagadow was part of Aware woreda.

== Demographics ==
Based on the 2007 Census conducted by the Central Statistical Agency of Ethiopia (CSA), this woreda has a total population of 112,924, of whom 63,431 are men and 49,493 women. While 8,114 or 7.19% are urban inhabitants, a further 58,781 or 52.05% are pastoralists. 100% of the population said they were Muslim.
