= Gashamo =

Gashamo Gaashaamo
- Location within Ethiopia
- Coordinates: 8°07′02″N 45°20′46″E
- Country: Ethiopia
- Region: Somali
- Zone: Jarar Zone
- Districts: Misraq Gashamo
- Elevation: 807 m (2,648 ft)

Population (2007)
  - Total: 6,659
- Time zone: UTC+3 (EAT)

Gashamo (Somali: Gaashaamo) is a town and the capital of the Misraq Gashamo woreda, in the Somali Region of Ethiopia. It is considered part of the Haud. It is approximately 45 kilometres (28 mi) south of the border with Somaliland.

== Demographics ==
Based on the 2007 Census conducted by the Central Statistical Agency of Ethiopia (CSA), the wider woreda has a total population of 95,191, of whom 52,645 are men and 42,546 women. While 6,659 or 7% are urban inhabitants, a further 20,583 or 21.62% are pastoralists. 98.72% of the population said they were Muslim. The town is dominated by the Garhajis clan.

The 1994 national census reported Gashamo's population was 2,998, with a total population for this woreda of 72,574, of whom 39,596 were men and 32,978 were women; 5,231 or 7.21% were urban inhabitants. The largest ethnic group reported in Misraq Gashamo was the Somali people (99.98%).
