= Gowlalale =

Gowlalale Gowlalaale
- Location within Somaliland
- Coordinates: 8°N 45.79°E
- Country: Somaliland
- Region: Somali
- Districts: degmada balidhiig
- Elevation: 807 m (2,648 ft)

Population (2007)
  - Total: 4,538
- Time zone: UTC+3 (EAT)

Gowlalale (Somali: Gowlalaale) is a town in the Balidhiig woreda in the Somali Region of Somaliland. It is populated by the |Reer Daahir[&]aadan madoobe] sub-division of the Habr Je'lo Isaaq.

== Demographics ==
According to the 2007 census conducted by the Central Statistical Agency of Ethiopia (CSA) the town had a population of 4,538.
