= List of Somalilanders =

This is a list of notable Somalilanders from Somaliland, as well as the Somaliland diaspora.

== Athletes ==
- Mo Farah – British-Somalilander long-distance runner
- Bashir Abdi – Belgian-Somalilander long-distance runner
- Mohammed Ahmed – Somali-Canadian long-distance runner
- Liban Abdi – Somalilander-Norwegian footballer
- Mohammed Ahamed – Somalilander-Norwegian footballer

== Authors and Poets ==
- Hadrawi – songwriter and philosopher
- Gaariye - Somali Poet
- Elmi Boodhari - Somali Poet and King of Romance
- Weedhsame - Somali Poet
- Hassan Ganey - Somali Poet
- Nadifa Mohamed – Somali-British novelist

== Entrepreneurs ==
- Abdirashid Duale – CEO and founder of Dahabshiil
- Ismail Ahmed – Executive Chairman and founder of WorldRemit
- Mohamed Said Guedi CEO MSG SomCable
- Abdikarim Mohamed Eid CEO Telesom

== Entertainers ==
- Chunkz – YouTuber, Influencer, and member of Beta Squad alongside Niko Omilana
- Aboflah-Kuwaiti-based YouTuber, streamer and philanthropist.
- AJ Shabeel - YouTuber, Influencer and member of Beta Squad together with Niko Omilana and Chunkz

== Journalists ==
- Rageh Omaar – Somalilander-British television news presenter
- Ahmed Said Egeh – former BBC Somali correspondent of Hargeisa

== Military ==
- General Nuh Ismail Tani – current Chief of Staff of Somaliland Armed Forces
- General Mohamed Adan Saqadhi – former Commissioner of Somaliland Police Force
- Mohamed Adan Saqadhi – current Commissioner of Somaliland Police Force

== Politicians ==
- Muse Bihi Abdi – former President of Somaliland
- Mohamoud Hashi Abdi The chairman of the Kaah party
- Mohamed Kahin Ahmed The Chairman of the Kulmiye party
- Mohamed Omar Hagi Mohamoud 1st Somaliland Ambassador to Israel and former Representative to Taiwan

=== Member of Parliament ===
- Mohamed Hassan Saed
- Barkhad Jama Batun – member House of Representatives

== Scientists ==
- Jama Musse Jama – Ethnomathematician and writer

== Other ==
- Nafisat Yusuf Mohammed — feminist activist

== See also ==
- List of Somalis
- List of Somaliland politicians
