= Military ranks of Somaliland =

The Military ranks of Somaliland are the military insignia used by the Somaliland Armed Forces, whose rank insignia combine those used by United Kingdom, which maintained colonial possessions in this country. Rank insignia follow thus the British pattern, but has four warrant officer ranks following the US model. The highest rank is lieutenant general, currently there has been no promotion to the rank of lieutenant general rank. Somaliland does not have an air force.

The armed forces of Somaliland were officially granted military ranks on February 2, 2013.

== Commissioned officer ranks ==
The rank insignia of commissioned officers.

Rank group	General / flag officers			Senior officers			Junior officers
Somaliland National Army
Somaliland National Army	Sareeye guud	Sareeye gaas	Sareeye guuto	Gashaanle sare	Gashaanle dhexe	Gashaanle	Dhamme	Laba xídígle	Xídígle
Somaliland Coast Guard
Somaliland Coast Guard	Admiraal kuxigeenka	Admiraal gaas	Admiraal guuto	Gashaanle sare	Gashaanle dhexe	Gashaanle	Dhamme	Laba xídígle	Xídígle
Somaliland Police
Somaliland Police		Sareeye gaas	Sareeye guuto	Gashaanle sare	Gashaanle dhexe	Gashaanle	Dhamme	Laba xídígle	Xídígle
Somaliland Custodial Corps
Somaliland Custodial Corps			Sareeye guuto	Gashaanle sare	Gashaanle dhexe	Gashaanle	Dhamme	Laba xídígle	Xídígle
Somaliland SIBC
Somaliland SIBC		Sareeye gaas	Sareeye guuto	Gashaanle sare	Gashaanle dhexe	Gashaanle	Dhamme	Laba xídígle	Xídígle
Rank group	General / flag officers			Senior officers			Junior officers

== Other ranks ==
The rank insignia of non-commissioned officers and enlisted personnel.

Rank group	Senior NCOs					Junior NCOs		Enlisted
Somaliland National Army
Somaliland National Army	Chief warrant officer Musharax sarkaal	Warrant officer class 1 Sadex xarígle	Warrant officer class 2 Laba xarígle	Warrant officer class 3 Xarígle	Sergeant; Sadex alífle	Corporal; Laba alífle	Lance corporal Alífle	Private (or equivalent); Dable
Somaliland Police
Somaliland Police	Chief warrant officer Musharax sarkaal	Warrant officer class 1 Sadex xarígle	Warrant officer class 2 Laba xarígle	Warrant officer class 3 Xarígle	Sergeant; Sadex alífle	Corporal; Laba alífle	Lance corporal Alífle	Constable; Dable
Somaliland Custodial Corps
Somaliland Custodial Corps	Chief warrant officer Musharax sarkaal	Warrant officer class 1 Sadex xarígle	Warrant officer class 2 Laba xarígle	Warrant officer class 3 Xarígle	Sergeant; Sadex alífle	Corporal; Laba alífle	Lance corporal Alífle	Private (or equivalent); Dable
Rank group	Senior NCOs					Junior NCOs		Enlisted
