= List of wars involving Somaliland =

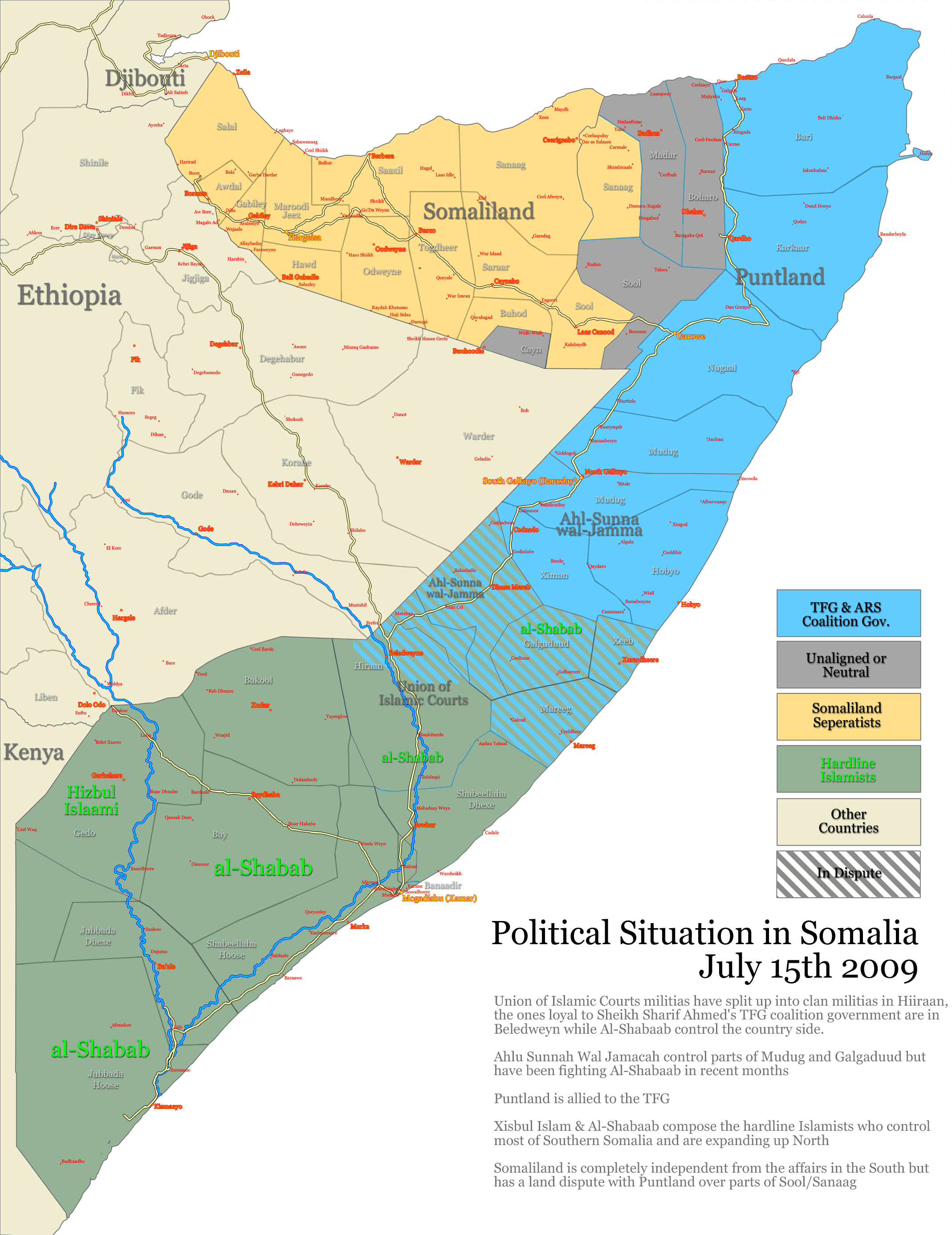

This is a list of wars involving the Republic of Somaliland and its predecessors.

== Ifat invasion of Shewa Sultanate (1285–1286) ==
Conflict	Combatant 1	Combatant 2	Result
Ifat invasion of Shewa Sultanate (1285-1286)	Ifat Sultanate	Ethiopian Empire	Victory

== Ifat Sultanate (1316–1332) ==
Conflict	Combatant 1	Combatant 2	Result
Conquests of the Emperor Amda Seyon I (1316–1332)	Ifat Sultanate	Ethiopian Empire	Defeat

== Ifat-Abyssinian War (1376–1403) ==
Conflict	Combatant 1	Combatant 2	Result
Ifat-Abyssinian War (1376–1403)	Ifat Sultanate	Ethiopian Empire	Defeat

== Campaigns of Jamal ad-Din (1424-1429) ==
Conflict	Combatant 1	Combatant 2	Result
Campaigns of Jamal ad-Din	Ifat Sultanate	Ethiopian Empire	Victory: Weaking of the Ethiopian Empire; Adalite conquest of Eastern Ethiopia; Ethiopians Abandon Bali

== Adal Sultanate (1415–1577) ==
Conflict	Combatant 1	Combatant 2	Result
Ethiopian–Adal War (1529-1543)	Adal Sultanate; Ottoman Empire (1542–43)	Ethiopian Empire; Portuguese Empire (1541–43)	Defeat

== Sultanate of Adal (1550–1577) ==
Conflict	Combatant 1	Combatant 2	Result
Nech Sar (1559)	Adal Sultanate	Ethiopian Empire	Victory: Adal succeeds in regaining control of the southern part of the Ethiopian Empire

== Somali Portoguese Conflicts ==
Conflict	Combatant 1	Combatant 2	Result
Somali–Portuguese conflicts	Adal Sultanate	Portuguese Empire	Victory

== Ottoman-Ethiopian War (1557–1589) ==
Conflict	Combatant 1	Combatant 2	Result
Ottoman–Ethiopian War (1557–1589)	Ottoman Empire Ottoman Egypt Medri Bahri; Adal Sultanate	Ethiopian Empire	Peace treaty; Ethiopian victory in the highlands; Ottoman victory in the coastline; Decline and dissolution of the Adal Sultanate; Establishment of Habesh Eyalet in Hergigo and Massawa; The establishment of Ottoman Zeila

== Isaaq Sultanate (1750–1884) ==
Conflict	Combatant 1	Combatant 2	Result
Battle of Lafaruug (1749)	Isaaq Sultanate	Absame tribes Ogaden tribes	Victory: Establishment of the Isaaq Sultanate; Isaaq expansion into southern Saaxil and parts of Maroodi Jeex

== Battle of Berbera (1827) ==
Conflict	Combatant 1	Combatant 2	Result
Battle of Berbera (1827)	Isaaq Sultanate: Habr Awal	United Kingdom; East India Company	Defeat

== Blocade of Berbera (1855–1856) ==
Conflict	Combatant 1	Combatant 2	Result
Blocade of Berbera	Isaaq Sultanate	British empire	Resolved by treaty: the dangers and the costs put off new British expeditions in the region until the 1880s

Egyptian occupation of the isaaq Sultanate (1873-1884)

Conflict	Combatant 1	Combatant 2	Result
Egyptian occupation	Khedivate of Egypt Ottoman Zeila	Emirate of Harar; Sultanate of Aussa; Oromo	Victory

== Dervish State (1899–1920) ==
Conflict	Combatant 1	Combatant 2	Result
Somaliland Campaign (1900–1920)	Dervish movement; Supported by: Ottoman Empire; Ethiopia (1915–1916)	British Empire; Italy; Ethiopia (1900–1904)	Defeat

== Isaaq Tribe of Somaliland ==
Conflict	Combatant 1	Combatant 2	Result
Burao tax revolt (1922)	Isaaq Sultanate: Habr Yunis	United Kingdom: British Somaliland	Victory: Captain Allan Gibb killed; Protectorate Tax Policy abandoned; Burao destroyed after Royal Air Force firebombing

== Italian conquest of British Somaliland (1884–1960) ==
Conflict	Combatant 1	Combatant 2	Result
Italian conquest of British Somaliland (1940)	British Empire: United Kingdom; India; Somaliland; Kenya; Nyasaland; Northern Rhodesia; Southern Rhodesia; Australia (naval); South Africa (air force)	Italy: Italian East Africa	Defeat: Annexed to Italian East Africa (Note: 18 August 1940 – 8 April 1941)

== Operation Appearance (1941) ==
Conflict	Combatant 1	Combatant 2	Result
Operation Appearance (1941)	United Kingdom: (British Raj) British India; South Africa; Somaliland	Italy: Italian East Africa	Victory: Re-establishment of British Somaliland

== East African campaign (WWII) ==
Conflict	Combatant 1	Combatant 2	Result
East African campaign (1940-1941)	British Empire: United Kingdom; India; South Africa; Kenya; Sudan; Nigeria; Gold Coast; Somaliland; Northern Rhodesia; Southern Rhodesia; Uganda; Nyasaland; Australia; New Zealand; (Ethiopian Empire) Ethiopian Arbegnoch; Belgium: Congo; Free France: Equatorial Africa	Italy: Italian East Africa	Victory: Dissolution of Italian East Africa (AOI); Eritrea, Somaliland and Ethiopia under British military administration

== Somali Republic (1960–1969) ==
Conflict	Combatant 1	Combatant 2	Result
Shifta War (1963–1967)	Northern Frontier Districts Liberation Movement: Hawiye group; Darod group; Supported by: Somalia; Soviet Union	Kenya Colony (until Dec. 1963); Kenya (from Dec. 1963); Supported by: United Kingdom; Ethiopian Empire	Ceasefire

== 1964 Ethiopian-Somali Border War ==
Conflict	Combatant 1	Combatant 2	Result
First Ogaden War (1964)	(Somalia) Somalia; Supported by: (United Arab Republic) Egypt	(Ethiopian Empire) Ethiopia; Supported by: United States	Stalemate: Armistice; Ethiopian incursions failed; Status quo ante bellum; Demilitarized zone created; July 1964 OAU Cairo Declaration

== Somali Democratic Republic (1969–1991) ==
Conflict	Combatant 1	Combatant 2	Result
Second Ogaden War (1977-1978)	Somalia; WSLF	Ethiopia; Cuba; Soviet Union; South Yemen	Defeat: Somalia breaks all ties with the Soviet Bloc and the Second World (except China and Romania).; Beginning of the Somali Rebellion

== Somali National Movement (1981-1991) ==
Conflict	Combatant 1	Combatant 2	Result
Somaliland War of Independence (1981–1991)	SNM; Supported by: Ethiopia (1981-1986)	Somalia: Somali Revolutionary Socialist Party; Supported by: Djibouti; United States (1981-1988); Saudi Arabia; Libya (1988-1991); South Africa (1984-1991)	Victory: End of the Isaaq Genocide.; End of WSLF oppression; Grand Conference of the Northern Clans held in Burao ends major combat operations; Collapse of the Somali Democratic Republic; Creation of the Republic of Somaliland on 18 May 1991.; Beginning of the 1991 Zeila incursion

== Republic of Somaliland (1991-Present) ==
Conflict	Combatant 1	Combatant 2	Result
Puntland–Somaliland dispute (1998–present)	Somaliland	Somalia: SSC-Khatumo; Puntland	Ongoing: Khatumo forces partially seize the Sool and region from Somaliland and reintegrate it into the Federal Government of Somalia; Las Anod conflict between Somaliland and SSC-Khatumo begins in 2023
Somali Civil War (2009–present)	Somaliland; Somaliland Armed Forces; SSB; Alleged support: Ethiopia; United Arab Emirates	Somalia; Somali Armed Forces; Regional forces: Galmudug; Galmudug Security Force; Ahlu Sunna Waljama'a (until 2018); (Somalia) Ma'awisley; Hirshabelle; Khatumo; Southwestern Somalia; Himan and Heeb (until 2015); United States: U.S. Army; U.S. Marine Corps; U.S. Air Force; U.S. Navy; CIA; AFRICOM; Turkey: Turkish Land Forces; AUSSOM (2025–present): Burundi (under discussion); Djibouti; Egypt (under discussion); Ethiopia; Kenya; Uganda; ATMIS (2022–2024): Burundi; Djibouti; Ethiopia; Kenya; Uganda; AMISOM (2007–2022): Burundi; Djibouti; Ethiopia; Ghana; Kenya; Nigeria; Sierra Leone; Uganda; Supported by: France; Italy; Russia; UAE; United Kingdom Non-combat support: European Union; EUTM Somalia; (United Nations) UNPOS (1995–2013) (United Nations) UNSOM (2013–2024): Brazil; Finland; Germany; Ghana; India; Indonesia; Nepal; Sierra Leone; Sweden; Thailand; Turkey; Uganda; United Kingdom; Zimbabwe; (United Nations) UNTMIS (2025–present) (United Nations) UNSOA (2009–2016) (United Nations) UNSOS (2016–present) Council for Somalia's Future Puntland: Puntland Security Force; Puntland Dervish Force; Puntland Maritime Police Force; Jubaland: Jubaland Dervish Force; Raskamboni Movement; Al-Qaeda and allies; Al-Shabaab; AQAP; AQIM; Hizbul Islam (until 2010; 2012–2013) Alleged state allies: Eritrea; Iran; Quds Force; Qatar; Alleged non-state allies: Houthis; Somali pirates: Islamic State (since 2015); Somalia Wilayah; Allies; IS-YP; Somali pirates	Ongoing: Merger and split between/of Hizbul Islam and al-Shabaab forces; Kenyan military intervention in October 2011; Al-Shabaab becomes an official al-Qaeda affiliate in February 2012; Federal Government formed in August 2012; Formation of the Islamic State in Somalia in October 2015; Somali government launches a major offensive in August 2022, and takes at least a third of al-Shabaab territory; Las Anod conflict between Somaliland and SSC-Khatumo begins in 2023; Ongoing constitutional crisis in Somalia since 2023, Puntland withdrew its recognition of the Federal Government and declared itself a de facto independent state. Jubaland crisis ongoing since 11 December 2024
Las Anod conflict (2023–present)	Somaliland	Somalia: SSC-Khatumo	Ongoing: Recognition of Khatumo State by Federal Government of Somalia; Spillover into Togdheer and Sanaag regions; SSC-Khatumo troops capture 3 military bases and towns in the Las Anod District and Sool region.; SSC forces push Somaliland army 100 km west from Las Anod

== See also ==
- List of conflicts in Somaliland

== Sources ==
- Behr, Agnes Wanjiru (2018). Border, Identity and (In) Security: The Kenya-Somalia Border 1963-2016 (PhD thesis). United States International University Africa.
- Gorman, Robert F. (1981). Political Conflict on the Horn of Africa. Westport, CT: Praeger. ISBN 978-0-030-59471-7.
- Zaccaria, Massimo (2021-07-29). "Somalia". 1914-1918-online. International Encyclopedia of the First World War. Berlin: International Encyclopedia of the First World War.
