= List of conflicts in Somaliland =

This is a list of conflicts in Somaliland, including wars, armed rebellions, battles and skirmishes that took place within Somaliland. It encompasses colonial wars, wars of independence, secessionist and separatist conflicts, major episodes of national violence (riots, massacres, etc.), and global conflicts in which Somaliland was a theatre of war.

Location of Somaliland

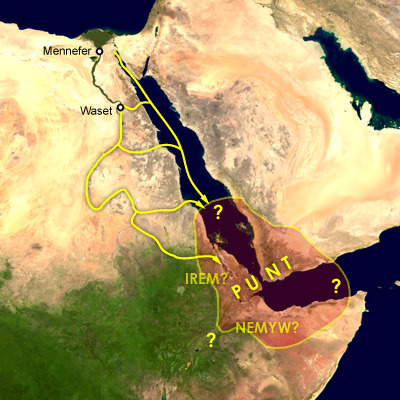
Supposed location of the Land of Punt around the Red Sea and major travel routes by land and sea

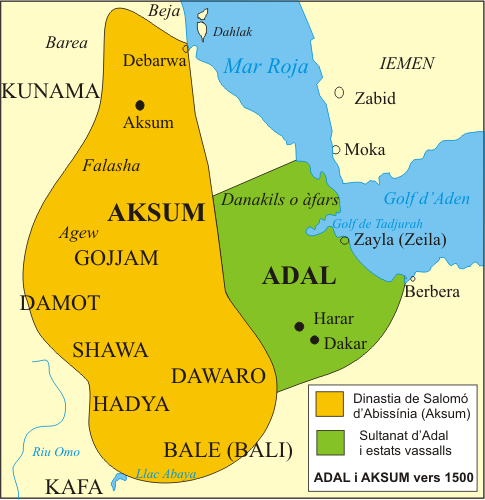
Territory of the Sultanate of Adal and its vassal states circa 1500.

== Medieval times ==
=== Adal Sultanate ===
- 1529 C.E. – 1543 C.E. Ethiopian–Adal War
  - April 4, 1542 C.E. – April 16, 1542 C.E. Battle of Jarte

== Modern times ==
=== Isaaq Sultanate ===
1825 – 1827 C.E. Battle of Berbera

=== Dervish movement ===
- 1881 C.E. – 1920 C.E. Scramble for Africa
  - 1900 C.E. – 1920 C.E. Somaliland Campaign
    - January 1920 C.E. – February 1920 C.E. Somaliland campaign
- July 28, 1914 C.E. – November 11, 1918 C.E. World War I
  - August 3, 1914 C.E. – November 23, 1918 C.E. African theatre
    - August 3, 1914 C.E. – November 1918 C.E. East African Campaign

=== British Somaliland ===
- February 25, 1922 C.E. – Late March 1922 C.E. Burao Tax Revolt
- July 2, 1945 C.E. - July 7, 1945 C.E. 1945 Sheikh Bashir Rebellion

=== Italian East Africa ===
- June 10, 1940 C.E. – November 27, 1941 C.E. World War II
  - June 10, 1940 C.E. – May 2, 1945 C.E. Mediterranean and Middle East theatre
    - June 10, 1940 C.E. – November 27, 1941 C.E. East African Campaign
      - August 3, 1940 C.E. – August 19, 1940 C.E. Italian conquest of British Somaliland

=== Somali Republic ===
- July 13, 1977 C.E. – March 15, 1978 C.E. Ethio—Somali War
- April 6, 1981 C.E. - May 18, 1991 C.E. Somaliland War of Independence
- June 1982 C.E. – August 1982 C.E. Ethiopian–Somali Border War
  - 1986 C.E. – 1991 C.E. Somali Rebellion

=== Somaliland ===
- 1998 C.E. – ongoing Puntland-Somaliland dispute

== See also ==
- Somaliland Armed Forces
- Somaliland Navy
- Military history of Africa
- African military systems to 1,800 C.E.
- African military systems 1,800 C.E. — 1,900 C.E.
- African military systems after 1,900 C.E.
