= Osman Awad Hashi =

Former Somaliland chief of staff

Chief of the General Staff of Somaliland
- In office 1996 – October 1996
- Preceded by: Hassan Ali Abokor
- Succeeded by: Hassan Yonis Habane

Personal details
- Died: March 9, 2018 Hargeisa
- Nickname: Dacas

Osman Awad Hashi (Somali: Cismaan Cawad Xaashi), as known as Osman Dacas (Somali: Cismaan Dacas), was 2nd chief of staff of the Somaliland Armed Forces.

== Biography ==
Osman Dacas is from the Habr Je'lo clan.

=== Activities at SNM ===
Osman Dacas was in charge of the eastern area during his Somali National Movement (SNM) days.

He joined the occupation battle in Burco.

=== After the foundation of Somaliland ===
In 1994, a land dispute arose between Osman Dacas and Muse Bihi Abdi, then Minister of the Interior. Muse Bihi Abdi claimed that his land was taken during the civil war.

In 1996 Osman Dacas became commander of the Somaliland Armed Forces. However, it was replaced by Hassan Yonis Habane in October 1996.

In February 2016, Osman Dacas was named by the president as one of seven people who had distinguished themselves in the military at a ceremony marking the 22nd anniversary of the founding of the Somaliland Armed Forces.

In August 2016, he congratulated Nuh Ismail Tani, the newly appointed commander of the Somaliland Armed Forces.

=== Death and After ===
On March 9, 2018, he died in Hargeisa. He was a veteran at the time of his death. President Muse Bihi and others attended the March 10 state funeral.

In September 2018, it was reported that the government had seized Osman Dacas' land.
