= Abdisamad Haji Abdilahi =

Former Somaliland chief of staff (2002–2003)

Abdisamad Haji Abdilahi Diriye Warsame

Chief of the General Staff of Somaliland
- In office 21 February 2002 – 2 December 2003
- Preceded by: Hassan Yonis Habane
- Succeeded by: Nuh Ismail Tani

Personal details
- Born: 1945 (age 80–81) Sheikh, British Somaliland
- Nickname: Gamgam

Abdisamad Haji Abdilahi Diriye Warsame (Somali: Cabdisamad Xaaji Abdilaahi Diiriye, Cabdi-samad X. Cabdillaahi), also known as "Gamgam", was a chief of staff of the Somaliland Armed Forces.

Relation map.

== Biography ==
He was born in 1945 in Sheikh.

He attended elementary school in Hargeisa and Sheikh. He attended Amud high school from 1962 to 1966.

He attended Egyptian Military College from 1966 to 1968. During his studies, he participated in the defense of the Cairo International Airport during the Six-Day War. He took the Chief of Staff course from 1973 to 1974.

From 1975 to 1977 he studied at the Frunze Military Academy in Russia.

He participated in the 1977 war between Ethiopia and Somalia, Ogaden War, as a major, fighting in Dire Dawa and elsewhere.

=== SNM Period ===
In 1986 he joined the Somali National Movement (SNM) in Mustahīl, Ethiopia.

In September 1988, he participated in a conference of the Workers' Party of Ethiopia, the Somali Salvation Democratic Front, and the SNM in Harar, Ethiopia, as a member of the SNM delegation with Ahmed Mohamed Mohamoud, Hadrawi, and others.

=== After the foundation of Somaliland ===
In 1991 he became commander of the 17th Army Base in Berbera.

He was Commander of the Somaliland National Army from 2003 to 2004.

From 2004 to 2010 he was Defense Advisor with President Dahir Riyale Kahin.

In 2007, he participated in the preparation of the plan for the occupation of Las Anod by Somaliland.

From 2010 to 2017 he was Military advisor with President Silanyo.

In Las Anod conflict in 2023, he recommended withdrawing from the Tukaraq base and entering the defense of the Gojacade base near Las Anod as Defense advisor for President Bibi.
