= Hassan Ali Abokor =

Former Somaliland chief of staff

Chief of the General Staff of Somaliland
- In office 1993–1996
- Preceded by: New title
- Succeeded by: Osman Awad Hashi

Hassan Ali Abokor (Somali: Xasan Cali Abokor) was first chief of staff of the Somaliland Armed Forces. As of 2024, he is the only national military commander who is not Habr Awal branch.

== Biography ==
Hassan Ali Abokor is from the Habr Je'lo branch of the Isaaq clan.

On May 27, 1988, he was one of the Somali National Movement (SNM) commanders, along with Mohamed Kahin Ahmed and Axmed Mirre, when the SNM captured Burco. Later, Adan Salebaan (Ma-Gube) became army commander and Hassan Ali Abokor became deputy commander.

=== First commander of the Somaliland Army ===
In 1993, Hassan Ali Abokor was appointed by the President of Somaliland as the first commander of the Somaliland Armed Forces.

In 1994, he created the formal Somaliland National Army with General Abdisamad Gamgam under Army Chief of Staff Muse Bihi Abdi.

In 1996 he was replaced as commander by Osman Awad Hashi (Osman Dacas).

=== Thereafter ===
In November 2006, Hassan Ali Abokor expressed his condolences on the passing of Hassan Yonis Habane.

In November 2010, he was reported as a leading candidate for Director of National Intelligence, but was ultimately replaced by Maxamed Nuur Xirsi.

In February 2016, at the celebration of the 22nd anniversary of the creation of the National Armed Forces, he was named by the President of Somaliland as one of the first seven people to have contributed to the National Armed Forces.

In February 2017, at a ceremony marking the 23rd anniversary of the creation of the national army, the president of Somaliland praised him by name.
