= Ismail Mohamed Osman =

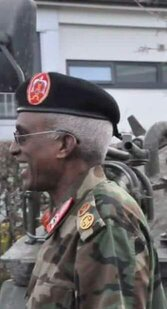
- Ismail Mohamed Osman (Shaqale)

Chief of the General Staff of Somaliland
- In office 11 February 2012 – 15 August 2016
- Preceded by: Mohamed Hasan Abdullahi
- Succeeded by: Nuh Ismail Tani

Personal details
- Born: Somaliland

Military service
- Allegiance: Somaliland
- Branch/service: Somaliland National Army
- Years of service: 2012-2016
- Rank: Major general
- Commands: Chief of Staff; Commander, Somaliland Defence Command
- Battles/wars: Puntland–Somaliland dispute

Ismail Mohamed Osman Shaqale (Ismaaciil Maxamed Cismaan Shaqale) was the Chief of Army of Somaliland. He was appointed as the Chief of Staff after General Mohamed Hasan Abdullahi (also known as “Jidif”) was fired after 90 days on the job.

== Biography ==
Shaqale hails from the Sa'ad Musa sub-division of the Habr Awal Isaaq clan.

In February 2001, President Egal removed Shaqale from his position as Commander of the National Army. He was replaced by Hasan Yoonis Habbane.

In February 2003, Shaqale expressed its opinion on a dispute over ownership in the construction of a hospital in Hargeisa.

In February 2010, he was honored as a former Commander of the National Armed Forces of Somaliland at a ceremony commemorating the 16th anniversary of the creation of the Somaliland National Armed Forces.

In July 2011, attended the memorial service for Maxamed Aw Cali Dayib with Mohamed Kahin Ahmed, Muse Bihi Abdi and others.

=== Chief of the General Staff ===
In February 2012, Shaqale became chief of the general staff of the Somaliland Armed Forces.

In November 2013, it was reported that Shaqale was in dispute with Abdulahi Jaamac calas, a senior military official.

In August 2014, Shaqale announced that its forces had overrun Sahdheer.

In September 2014, Shaqale purchased $698,600 worth of weapons from the Ethiopian company Metals and Engineering Corporation (METEC), reports in later years revealed.

In January 2015, Shaqale was reportedly unpopular.

In February 2016, he attended the celebration of the 22nd anniversary of the founding of the Somaliland Armed Forces.

In July 2016, there was a battle with Puntland in Booda-cade, which resulted in the capture of a Puntland MP and former Deputy Minister of Religious Affairs and Donations and three military vehicles.

On August 15, 2016, President Somaliland announced a major change in personnel, and Shaqale was also ousted. He was replaced by Nuh Ismail Tani.
