= Mohamed Hasan Abdullahi =

Former Somaliland chief of staff (2011–2012)

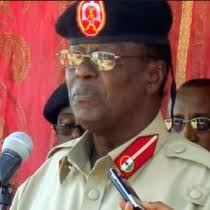

Chief of the General Staff of Somaliland
- In office 11 December 2011 – 11 February 2012
- Preceded by: Nuh Ismail Tani
- Succeeded by: Ismail Mohamed Osman

Personal details
- Born: 1950 Hargeisa, British Somaliland
- Died: 15 November 2023 (aged 72–73)
- Nickname: Jidhif

Military service
- Allegiance: Somaliland
- Branch/service: Somaliland National Army
- Years of service: 2011 - 2012
- Rank: Major general
- Commands: Chief of staff Commander, Somaliland Defence Command

General Mohamed Hasan Abdullahi (Somali: Maxamed Xasan Cabdilaahi) also known as "Jidhif" was a chief of staff of the Somaliland Armed Forces. He hails from In the 1980s, he joined the Somali National Movement. Before being appointed as the chief of staff, he was head of Mercy Corps in Somaliland.

Relation map.

== Biography ==
Jidhif was born in Hargeisa in 1950. His father is Xasan Cabdi Laahi and his mother is Aamina Yoonis Boon.

Jidhif entered elementary school in Tog Wajaale in 1960. His nickname Jidhif was given to him at this time by journalist Ahmed Hassan Awke. He received his secondary education from 1963 at the Eek Amoud School in Borama. He attended the Burco technical institute from 1967 to 1970.

=== Somali armed forces officer ===
In 1970, Jidhif joined the Somali armed forces and attended the Army University in Odesa, Soviet Union, from that year until 1973. He entered Moscow State University in 1973 with a degree in civil engineering.

In 1977 Somalia began a war with neighboring Ethiopia (Ogaden War); Jidhif returned to Somalia in 1977 to serve in the war.

Since 1981, Jidhif has worked for Chafrol Intertnational Oil Company, a U.S.-based oil research company.

=== Somali National Movement ===
Jidhif was arrested in Somalia in 1984 and placed in Godka Prison and eventually sent to Mandera Prison. Upon his release in 1987, he fled the capital, Mogadishu, to Ethiopia. He passed through Ferfer in Ethiopia and joined the Somali National Movement (SNM) in Mustahīl.

In late 1988, Jidhif became the first commander of the 99th SNM battalion established in Baligubadle, Somaliland. The battalion was given about 400 infantrymen, one dump truck, and one gun truck. Jidhif's forces put up a good fight, but early in the battle the SNM was defeated by Somali armed forces and temporarily withdrew to Ethiopia. Soon, however, they succeeded in counterattacking, forcing the Somali armed forces to retreat.

=== After the founding of Somaliland ===
When Somaliland was founded in 1991, Jidhif was put in charge of the security forces; in 1994 he became the first deputy commander of the Somaliland Police.

=== Chief of staff ===
He was appointed as the chief of staff of the Military of Somaliland in a presidential decree by President Mohamed Haji Ibrahim Egal. He succeeded the rehabilitation of the Somaliland clans that was spearheaded at that time by General Hassan Yonis Habane.

On 11 December 2011, he was appointed as chief of staff of the military of Somaliland in a presidential decree by President Ahmed Mahamoud Silanyo. His predecessor was abruptly dismissed, the reason for which was not disclosed.

On 9 February 2012, Abdullahi was sacked due to the inability of Somaliland Armed Forces' to take control of Buuhoodle from forces loyal to the then newly established Khatumo State. The handover ceremony to Jidhif's successor Ismail Mohamed Osman was held in private.

=== After Retiring ===
In February 2014, he criticized the UN's policy of neglecting Somaliland in favor of Somalia.

In September 2014, the international community criticized the Somaliland military for its lack of understanding.

In May 2016, Jidhif spoke about former Somaliland President Muhammad Haji Ibrahim Egal, who died 14 years ago.

In June 2016, Jidhif, along with several others, was invited to a dinner by Mawliid Ibraahim Sabeyse, Suldaan of Sacad Muuse.

n January 2017, Jidhif commented on the Somaliland government and the United Arab Emirates communicating over Berbera.

In November 2017, Jidhif called on the people of Somaliland to keep the peace and to be vigilant against anything that might disturb the peace.

=== Death ===
Jidhif died on the evening of November 14, 2023.

On November 15, 2023, Jidhif's state funeral was held on the outskirts of Hargeisa, attended by the president of Somaliland and others.
