= Somaliland passport =

Passport of the Republic of Somaliland issued to Somalilander citizens

Somaliland Passport Baasaboorka Somaliland (Somali) جواز سفر (Arabic)
- Type: Passport
- Issued by: Somaliland Immigration
- First issued: 1996 (first version); 14 September 2014 (biometric version)
- Purpose: Identification
- Eligibility: Somaliland citizenship
- Expiration: 5 years
- Cost: $103 for Somaliland National ID holders.

The Somaliland passport (Somali: Baasaboorka Somaliland, Arabic: جواز سفر صوماليلاندي) is the passport issued to citizens of Republic of Somaliland for travel. A passport was issued for the first time in 1996, and a biometric passport in 2014, in line with new global standards and the requirements of the International Civil Aviation Organization.

== Passport descriptions ==
The color of the Somaliland passport is black, and it bears the symbol of the state's sovereignty. It also bears the following inscriptions in the Somali, Arabic and English languages:

Above: "Republic of Somaliland" (Somali: Jamhuuriyadda Somaliland) (Arabic: جمهورية صومالي لاند)

In the center: Emblem of Somaliland

Below: "Passport" (Somali: Baasaboor) (Arabic: جواز سفر)

Notably, the three-letter code used in Somaliland passports to represent the country and nationality is RSL, which is absent from the ISO 3166-1 alpha-3 list of country codes, undermining its utility as a travel document.

== Acceptance for international travel ==
Holders of a Somaliland passport can travel to the following countries:

Djibouti
Rwanda
South Africa
Egypt
United Arab Emirates
Uganda
Kenya
South Sudan
Taiwan
Tanzania
Israel

== Types ==
There are a number of types of Somaliland passports:

Regular Passport

Service Passport

Diplomatic Passport

- Regular Passport (black cover): issued to Somaliland citizens.
- Service Passport (green cover): issued to members of Parliament, members of the Government.
- Diplomatic Passport (red cover): issued to diplomats serving abroad and to high-ranking officials from the executive branch and their families during their period of service.

== Passport gallery ==
A Republic of Somaliland passport issued in 2010s

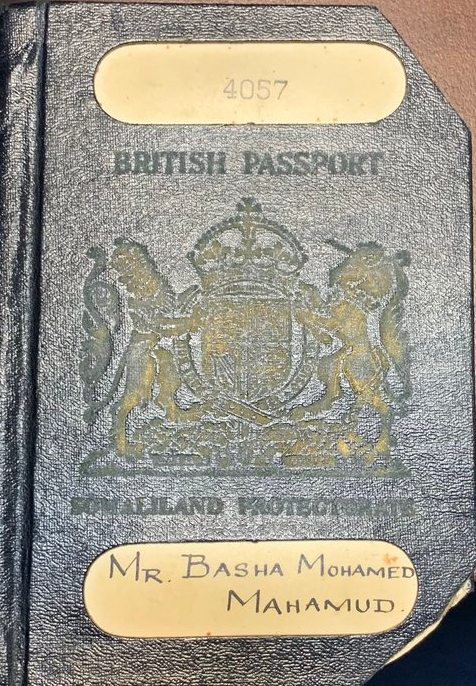
British Somaliland Passport issued during the British era in the 1930s.

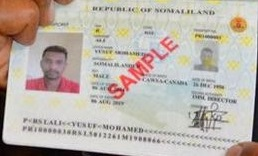
Data page of a first generation biometric passport

== See also ==
- Visa policy of Somaliland
- National identity card
