= Chief of the General Staff (Somaliland) =

Head of the Armed Forces of Somaliland

- Taliyaha Guud ee Ciidanka Qaranka Somaliland
- Flag of the Chief of the General Staff

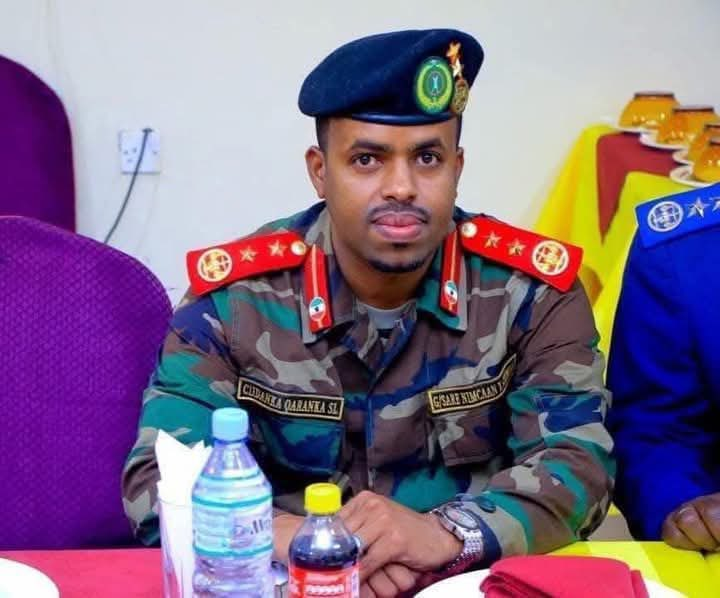
- Incumbent; Major General Nimcaan Yusuf Osman since 23 January 2025
- Ministry of Defense and Somaliland Armed Forces
- Style: Excellency
- Member of: Ministry of Defense
- Reports to: Minister of Defence
- Appointer: President
- Formation: 1993

The Chief of the General Staff (Somali: Taliyaha Guud ee Ciidanka) is the head of the General Staff and the highest ranking officer of the Somaliland Armed Forces. He is appointed by the President of Somaliland, who holds the position of Commander-in-Chief and the head of the Somaliland Armed Forces. The current Chief of the General Staff is Major general Nimcaan Yusuf Osman.

== List of Chiefs ==
| No. | Photo | Name | Term of office | | | Ref. |
| No. | Photo | Name | Took office | Left office | Time in office | Ref. |
|---|---|---|---|---|---|---|
| 1 | | Hassan Ali Abokor | 1993 | 1996 | 4 years | |
| 2 | | Osman Awad Hashi (Osman Dacas) | 1996 | October 1996 | 1 year | |
| 3 | | Hassan Yonis Habane | October 1996 | 21 September 1997 | 1 year | |
| 4 | | Ismail Mohamed Osman (Shaqale) | September 1997 | 23 February 23 2001 | 3 years, 5 months | |
| 5 | | Hassan Yonis Habane | 23 February 23 2001 | 21 February 2002 | 1 year | |
| 6 | | Abdisamad Haji Abdilahi Diriye Warsame (Gamgam) | 21 February 2002 | 2 December 2003 | 1 year, 284 days | |
| 7 | | Colonel; Nuh Ismail Tani | 2 December 2003 | 11 December 2011 | 8 years, 9 days | |
| 8 | | Major general Mohamed Hasan Abdullahi | 11 December 2011 | 11 February 2012 | 62 days | |
| 9 | | Major general Ismail Mohamed Osman | 11 February 2012 | 15 August 2016 | 4 years, 217 days | |
| 10 | | Major general Nuh Ismail Tani | 15 August 2016 | 23 January 2025 | 9 years, 357 days | |
| 11 | | Major general Nimcaan Yusuf Osman | 23 January 2025 | Incumbent | 1 year, 227 days | |
