= Visa policy of Somaliland =

Policy on permits required to enter Somaliland

The visa policy of Somaliland sets out the procedures for applying for and obtaining of visas in Somaliland.

In accordance with the law, citizens of all countries require a visa to visit Somaliland.

Somaliland and Somalia have completely different visa policies and Somaliland authorities do not recognize national visas issued by Somalia.

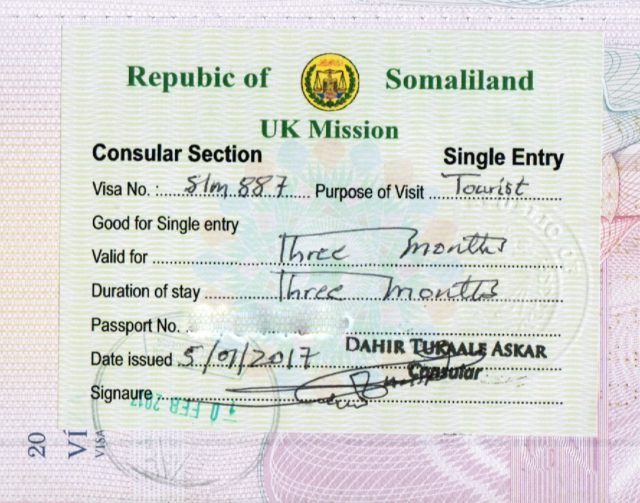
Somaliland tourist visa issued in United Kingdom with Somaliland entry and exit date

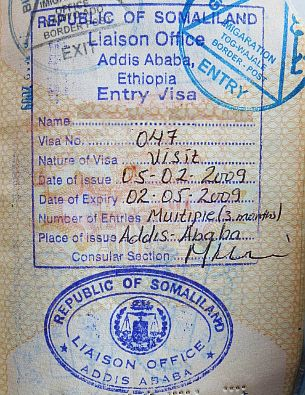
Somaliland visa issued by the Somaliland Liaison Office, Addis Ababa

== Visa policy map ==
Visa policy of Somaliland Somaliland Visa on arrival

== Visa on arrival ==
Citizens of all countries and territories may obtain a visa on arrival in Somaliland. However, the Visa on Arrival facility will be available exclusively to travelers entering the Republic of Somaliland through the following designated international airports:

Visa on Arrival Port of Entries :

- Hargeisa Airport
- Berbera Airport

== Visa required in advance ==
All travelers seeking to enter Somaliland through land border crossings or seaports shall not be eligible for the visa on arrival facility and must apply for a visa in advance at the nearest Somaliland Embassy, Mission, or Consular Office, or alternatively request a visa online before commencing their journey.

== Visa types ==
- Tourist Visa - Price $60
- Business Visa - Price $10,000
- Health Visa
- Education Visa
- Transit visa

== Global Recognition and Somaliland Visa System ==
Somaliland's Visa System would be enhanced upon global recognition, with its own passport index rankings, Somaliland has a recognition bid that is gaining momentum, with countries setting new visa policy's and changes towards regions that include visits and how and where Somalilanders travel.

== See also ==
- Somaliland Immigration and Border Control
- Visa policy of Somalia
- Visa requirements for Somaliland citizens
- Somaliland passport
