= 1991 Zeila incursion =

Djiboutian-backed military offensive in Somaliland

- Part of the Somaliland War of Independence
- 1991 Zeila incursion (Awdal) 1991 Zeila incursion (Somaliland) Zeyla triangle
Date	9 February 1991
Location	Zeila, Somaliland
Result	SNM victory: USF forces flee to Djibouti and Bosaso; Military end of the Somaliland War of Independence
Territorial changes	Djibouti drops its territorial claims to the Zeila Triangle; SNM recaptures Zeila, Loyada and Garisa

Belligerents
United Somali Front (USF); Supported by: Djibouti (Somalia) Somali regime remnants	Somali National Movement (SNM)

Commanders and leaders
(Djibouti) Abdirahman Dualeh Ali (Djibouti) Hassan Gouled Aptidon (Djibouti) Ismail Omar Guelleh	Abdirahman Ahmed Ali Tuur; Mohamed Hasan Abdullahi (Jidhif)

Units involved
Unknown	99th Battalion

Strength
500	Unknown

Casualties and losses
Unknown	Minimal
- 50,000 Issa civilians displaced

The 1991 Zeila incursion (Somali: Dagaalkii Saylac) was a Djiboutian-backed incursion during the Somaliland War of Independence led by the United Somali Front (USF), purporting to politically represent the Issa clans in the western Awdal region of Somaliland, with the goal of annexing the towns of Zeila, Loyada and Gerisa (Zeyla triangle) to Djibouti.

A combined force of United Somali Front (USF) militia fighters mostly consisting of Issa from Djibouti and remnant Somali regiments of the Darod clan entered Somaliland and temporarily took over parts of western Awdal, including Zeila, Loyada and Gerisa, before being routed by SNM forces.

== Background ==
In the late 1980s, the Issa of Awdal region, led by Abdirahman Dualeh Ali, a former SNM leader, formed the United Somali Front (USF). The militia was discreetly supported and remotely controlled by current Djiboutian president Ismail Omar Guelleh, then head of the Djibouti secret service and the nephew of former then ruling president Hassan Gouled Aptidon. The USF, armed with small arms, engaged in preparation for the secession of this westernmost region of Somaliland. In a meeting of high-ranking Issa clan elders in January 1990, the annexation of Zeila and Lughaya to Djibouti was considered an imperative objective. Influential Issa politicians envisioned a Greater Djibouti or "Issa-land", where Djibouti's borders would extend from the Red Sea to Dire Dawa. The Isaaq (who make up 13.3-20% of Djibouti's population) were "traditional rivals" of the Djiboutian Issa, and the Issa were suspicious of them, believing that they discriminated against their Issa kinsmen in Somaliland. The Djiboutian Issa opposed a northern republic controlled by the Isaaq, believing that a united and diverse Somalia would offer more protection to Issas in Somaliland.

In late March 1990 the Somali National Army (SNA) had retaken Zeila, Lughaya and Loyada in order to discourage the ambitious attempts of the USF to lay claim to the area. In January 1991, USF elements engaged in separate negotiations with the SNA in the north to retrieve their disarmed weapons to cross into Djibouti and prepare to return in combat formation in the event that the government's army in Somaliland completely collapses.

== Clashes ==
On 9 February 1991, the SNM clashed with USF forces on the Djiboutian border, with the USF forces, backed by former Somali regulars, occupying the western parts of Awdal region with the goal of annexing Zeyla to Djibouti. SNM leader Suleiman Mohamoud Aden (Suleiman Gaal) and current speaker of Somaliland House of Elders warned Djibouti and advised Djibouti on non-intervention in the post-Siad Barre conflict. An SNM delegation led by SNM chairman Abdirahman Ahmed Ali Tuur subsequently went to Djibouti, where they were told by Hassan Guled Aptidon and his Secret Service Chief Ismail Omar Guelleh that the SNM should recognize its control over the Zeyla-Loyada-Garissa area (Zeyla triangle).

The SNM chairman rejected their claims and refused to comply, and took military action against the USF soldiers, which were swiftly routed and violently crushed. The Issa component sought safety in Djibouti, while the former Siad Barre soldiers, who were primarily from the Majerteen and Ogaden clans of the Darod, were transported by sea to Bosaso, where they joined the newly resurgent Somali Salvation Democratic Front (SSDF).

== Aftermath ==
The USF would consequently continue to attempt to detach the Issa-populated area of Awdal (the Loyada-Garissa-Zeyla triangle) from the rest of Somaliland, being swiftly crushed by SNM forces each time, including eight weeks of sporadic fighting in late 1995.
