= Mohamed Saqadhi Dubad =

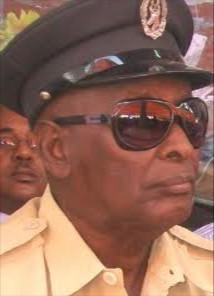

Chief of the Somaliland Police Force
- In office 2006 – 26 August 2010
- President: Dahir Riyale Kahin
- Preceded by: Mohamed Ige Ilmi
- Succeeded by: Elmi Roble Furre
- In office 11 June 2011 – 22 March 2012
- President: Ahmed Mohamed Mohamoud
- Preceded by: Elmi Roble Furre
- Succeeded by: Abdillahi Fadal Iman

Military service
- Branch/service: Somaliland Police Force
- Commands: Chief of Somaliland Police Force.

Mohamed Saqadhi Hirsi (Somali: Maxamed Saqadhi Xirsi, Maxamed Saqadhe), whose nickname is Dubad (also spelled Dubbad), was the former Police Commissioner of Somaliland.

== Biography ==
Dubad joined the Somaliland Police Force as a second lieutenant in the 1950s. He graduated from the Sheekh Police Academy and later received officer training in the United Kingdom.

At the time of the assassination of Somalia President Shermarke in 1969, Dubad was the police chief in Las Anod. He was also one of the officers who transported the assassinated president to the capital, Mogadishu.

=== During the presidency of Kahin ===
In 2006, Dubad was appointed as the Police Commissioner by Somaliland President Dahir Riyale Kahin. Dubad was known for his strong sense of justice. For example, when someone tried to negotiate with him to release a relative, he refused, saying it was against the law. The person them attempted to give him a reward, but he said, “Give that money to the army,” and refused.

Dubad also initiated reforms in the police system. For example, he established a loan program for police officers with low salaries during emergencies.

In July 2007, as Police Commissioner, Dubad ordered the arrest of Mohamed Abdi Gaboose, the chairman of the political organization Qaran. Ahmed Mohamed Mohamoud (Silanyo), the leader of the opposition party, criticized the government for this arrest, saying it was unjust.

In December 2007, Dubad expelled 21 Somalia-based journalists from the country for publishing articles deemed harmful to the security of Somaliland and the building of relations with Ethiopia.

=== During the presidency of Silanyo ===
In 2010, Ahmed Mohamed Mohamoud (Silanyo) was elected President of Somaliland. It is reported that Dubad had planned to leave for Ethiopia before the new president took office, but was unable to obtain a visa and abanddoned the plan. President Silanyo dismissed Dubad as Police Commissioner on August 26, 2010. His successor was Elmi Roble Furre.

On June 11, 2011, during acabinet reshuffle, Dubad was reappointed as the Police Commissioner, replacing Elmi Roble Furre. In his inaugural speech, Dubad emphasized the importance of maintaining good relations with Ethiopia.

In July 2011, Dubad visited Jijiga in Ethiopia with Nuh Ismail Tani, the military commander, to discuss border security.

=== Death ===
On March 22, 2012, Dubad died in Abu Dhabi, United Arab Emirates, while serving as the Chief of Police. He had been visiting the UAE for several months to receive treatment for his illness. The body could not be returned to Somaliland, and was buried in the Cemetery in Al Ain, United Arab Emirates. The flag of the Republic of Somaliland was draped over his coffin.

His successor as Police Commissioner was Abdillahi Fadal Iman.
