= Somaliland Fire Brigade =

Agency of the Government of Somaliland

Somaliland Fire Brigade Ciidanka Dab-demiska Somaliland فرقة إطفاء صوماليلاندي
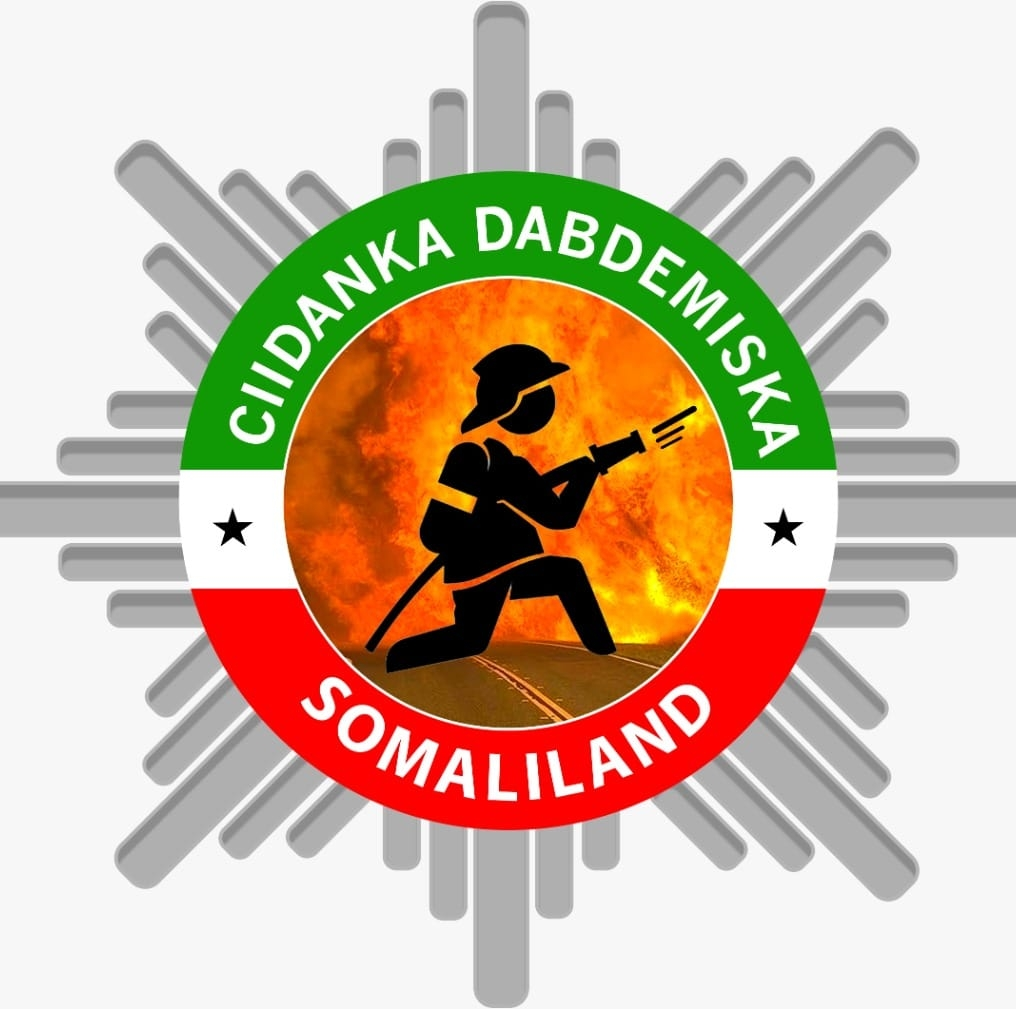
- Logo of the Somaliland Fire Brigade

Agency overview
- Formed: 2014

Jurisdictional structure
- Operations jurisdiction: Somaliland
- Map of Somaliland Fire Brigade's jurisdiction
- Governing body: Government of Somaliland

Operational structure
- Headquarters: Hargeisa, Somaliland
- Agency executive: Ahmed Mohamed Hassan, Brigadier General

Website
- fire.govsomaliland.org

The Somaliland Fire Brigade (Somali: Ciidanka Dab-demiska Somaliland, Arabic: فرقة إطفاء صوماليلاندي) is the main emergency firefighting and rescue service in the Republic of Somaliland. It operates under the authority of the Ministry of Interior and is responsible for fire suppression and disaster response across the country.

== History and Background ==
The Somaliland Fire Service is a government agency under the Ministry of Interior, officially established in 2014 by a presidential decree that stated the goal of establishing a “modern and well-trained national fire service,” headquartered in the capital of the Republic of Somaliland, with branches in the regions of the country, and is responsible for fire control and disaster prevention.

The structure of the Fire Service is governed by the "Somaliland Police and National Fire Service Act of 2014," which defines the structure, duties, and coordination of other emergency services, which fall under the jurisdiction of the Police Force.

Somaliland's fire services date back to ancient times, having evolved from colonial-era fire services to meet the needs of a growing urban population after Somaliland declared independence in 1991.

The Somaliland Fire Chief, Brigadier General Ahmed Mohamed Hassan, commonly known as “Sawahili,” has served since its founding in July 2014.

The President of Somaliland saw how they work and how they live, as well as the selfless things they do for their country and community every day and night. On the same day, he went to the Fire Service Department's Headquarters, where he was greeted by Brig. Gen. Ahmed Mohamed Hassan Sawahili, the commander of the Fire Service, and other high-ranking officials from the Somaliland Fire Service.

=== Community engagement ===
In recent years the Somaliland Fire Brigade has collaborated with local and international organizations to train communities on fire prevention and basic first response skills, especially in vulnerable areas such as IDP camps.

== Notable Incidents ==
Fire at Religious Center (2021): A fire at an Islamic learning center in Hargeisa hurt at least 49 people. The Somaliland Fire Brigade said in a statement that 40 women, eight men, and a firefighter were hurt. The fire department doesn't know what caused the fire, but they said the police are looking into it.

The Waaheen Market Fire in 2022 was one of the biggest market fires in Somaliland's history. It destroyed more than 2,000 businesses and left thousands of people without jobs.

Gobonimo Market Fire (2025): A huge fire destroyed a lot of the well-known market in Hargeisa. The fire brigade had a hard time getting to the scene because of traffic and bad roads.

== Ranks ==
Somaliland Fire Brigade
- Country: Somaliland
