= Abdillahi Fadal Iman =

Somaliland military official (1960–2019)

Abdillahi Fadal Iman عبد الله فضل إيمان
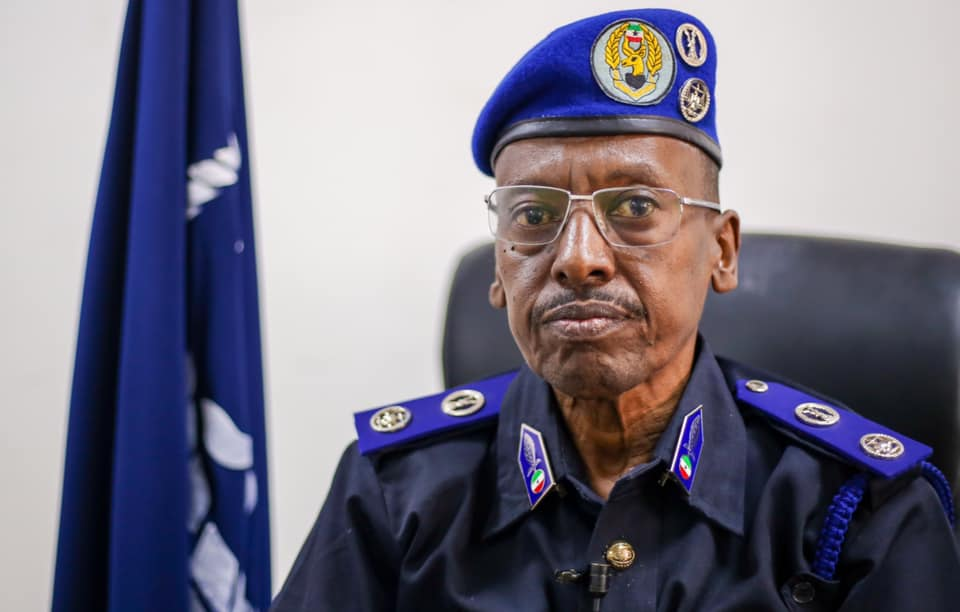

Chief of the Somaliland Police Force
- In office 30 March 2012 – 2 November 2019
- President: Ahmed Mohamed Mohamoud
- Preceded by: Mohamed Saqadhi Dubad
- Succeeded by: Mohamed Adan Saqadhi

Personal details
- Born: 18 April 1960 Hargeisa, British Somaliland (now Somaliland)
- Died: 2 November 2019 (aged 59) Hargeisa, Somaliland
- Spouse: 2
- Children: 22

Military service
- Branch/service: Somaliland Police
- Rank: Major general
- Commands: Major general

General Abdillahi Fadal Iman (Somali: Cabdilaahi Fadal Iimaan) was a Somaliland military official, who served as the Chief of Somaliland Police Force until his death in November 2019.

== See also ==
- Somaliland Police
- Somaliland Armed Forces
- Ministry of Defence (Somaliland)
- List of Somalis
