= Visa policy of Somalia =

Policy on permits required to enter Somalia

Visitors to Somalia must obtain an eTAS unless they are citizens from one of the visa-exempt countries or citizens who may obtain a visa on arrival.

All visitors must hold a passport valid for 6 months. Somaliland maintains a separate visa policy.

== Visa policy map ==
Visa policy of Somalia Somalia Visa not required (30 days) Visa on arrival / eTAS eTAS

== Visa exemption ==
Citizens of the following countries may enter Somalia without a visa for up to 30 days:

- Malaysia
- Rwanda

== Visa on arrival ==
Citizens of the following countries can obtain a visa on arrival valid for 30 days:

- Algeria
- Burundi
- Comoros
- Djibouti
- Egypt
- Ethiopia
- Libya
- Mauritania
- Tanzania
- Tunisia
- Uganda

== Electronic visa (e-Visa) ==
Visitors from other countries intending to travel to Somalia must have an approved Electronic Visa (eTAS) before the start of their journey.

=== Electronic Visa Requirement ===
Somalia has implemented an Electronic Visa and Travel Authorization System (eVisa/eTAS), requiring all foreign visitors including infants and children to obtain an approved visa or entry permit prior to travel.

This system, launched on August 28, 2025, became mandatory for all foreign visitors starting September 1, 2025. The initiative aims to modernize immigration procedures, enhance border security, and streamline the visa application process.

The e-Visa system is accessible online through the official portal: evisa.gov.so. Travelers can apply and receive their visas electronically, facilitating a more efficient and transparent process. The Immigration and Citizenship Agency (ICA) of Somalia has trained specialized staff to ensure the system's efficiency and transparency. According to Isaaq Hassan Taakow, ICA’s Director of Foreigners and Immigration, this modern system allows foreigners to apply for a visa from anywhere in the world and receive it within a short time.

The Somali government has stated that the e-Visa system will simplify travel, enhance transparency, and strengthen national security. With the rollout, all travelers entering Somalia are required to apply online for an eVisa, which is designed to cut wait times and streamline approvals.

== See also ==
- Visa requirements for Somali citizens
- Visa policy of Somaliland
