= Nimcaan Yusuf Osman =

Chief of the General Staff of the Somaliland Armed Forces

- Nimcaan Yuusuf Cismaan نعمان يوسف عثمان

Chief of the General Staff of the Somaliland Armed Forces
- Incumbent
- Assumed office 23 January 2025
- President: Abdirahman Mohamed Abdullahi
- Preceded by: Nuh Ismail Tani

Personal details
- Born: 1985 (age 40–41) Hargeisa, Somaliland
- Nickname: Gaaxnuug

Military service
- Allegiance: Somaliland
- Branch/service: Somaliland National Army
- Rank: Brigadier general
- Commands: Gamadiid Special Forces; Presidential Guard; Chief of the General Staff

Brigadier General Nimcaan Yusuf Osman (Somali: Nimcaan Yuusuf Cismaan; Arabic: نعمان يوسف عثمان; born 1985), nicknamed Gaaxnuug, is a Somaliland military officer who has served as Chief of the General Staff of the Somaliland Armed Forces since 23 January 2025. He was appointed by President Abdirahman Mohamed Abdullahi and was described at the time of his appointment as the youngest officer ever to hold the post.

== Early life and education ==
Nimcaan was born in 1985 in Hargeisa, where he completed his primary education. He is from the Arap branch of the Isaaq clan. He joined the army at a young age.

He holds bachelor's and master's degrees in military science from institutions in Ethiopia and the United Kingdom, with a focus on international security and military leadership, and at the time of his appointment was studying for a doctorate in advanced military studies in Taiwan. His army biography records command and leadership courses at the Defence Academy of the United Kingdom and studies in security sector management and defence at Cranfield University.

== Military career ==
Nimcaan rose through the ranks of the Somaliland National Army in special units. Before becoming Chief of Staff he commanded the Gamadiid Special Forces and the Presidential Guard during the presidency of Ahmed Mohamed Mohamoud (Siilaanyo).

=== Chief of the General Staff ===
On 23 January 2025 President Abdullahi appointed Nimcaan Chief of the General Staff by presidential decree, replacing Major General Nuh Ismail Tani, who became a presidential adviser. Some commentators questioned the choice of a young and relatively untested officer at a time of serious security challenges.

Shortly after his appointment the government announced a 50% pay rise for the armed forces in 2025, as part of a pledged 250% increase over the president's term, and an iris-based biometric registration of all security personnel to remove "ghost" soldiers from the payroll. His army biography credits him with a modernisation roadmap covering operational capability, logistics and digital command systems, the strengthening of the Dararweyne Military Academy, and the integration of units into a unified national force.

In February 2026 he attended the graduation of more than 6,000 newly trained soldiers in the Sool region, saying the armed forces were ready to defend the country. He has also hosted foreign military delegations, including the United States special operations commander for the Horn of Africa.
