= Elmi Roble Furre =

Former Chief of Somaliland Police

Elmi Roble Fure Kabaal
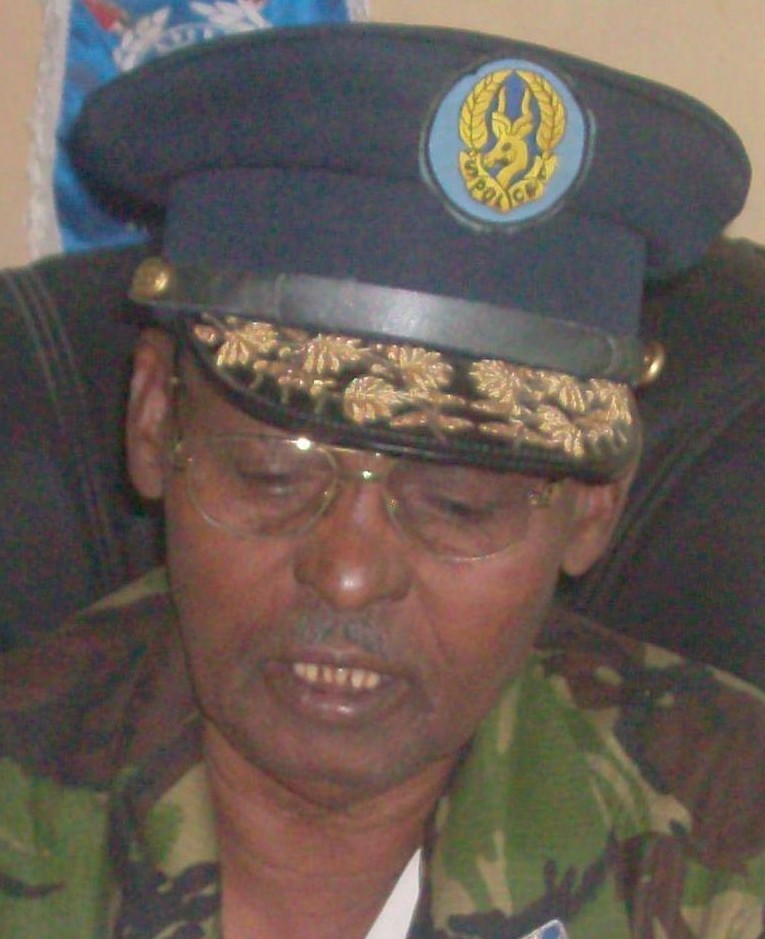

Chief of the Somaliland Police Force
- In office 1997 – May 1999
- President: Muhammad Haji Ibrahim Egal
- Preceded by: Abdi Suldaan Guray
- Succeeded by: Mohamed Jibril Abdi
- In office 26 October 2010 – 2011
- President: Ahmed Mohamed Mohamoud
- Preceded by: Mohamed Saqadhi Dubad
- Succeeded by: Mohamed Saqadhi Dubad

Military service
- Branch/service: Somaliland Police Force
- Commands: Chief of Somaliland Police Force.

Elmi Roble Furre (Fure, Somali: Cilmi Rooble Furre), nicknamed Kabaal, was a former Chief of Somaliland Police. He was also one of the traditional leaders (Suldaan) of Somaliland.

== Biography ==
Kabaal joined the police force in 1950 and received training in Mandera.

In 1997, when Muhammad Haji Ibrahim Egal was re-elected as Somaliland President, Kabaal became the Chief of Somaliland Police, succeeding Abdi Suldaan Guray. Kabaal relocated the police headquarters from Tubatariyo to the capital Hargeisa. He also rebuilt the Lihle Police Academy in Mandera. Kabaal himself stated that he introduced Dahir Riyale Kahin to President Egal and contributed to making Kahin the Vice President. In May 1999, President Egal dismissed Kabaal from his position as Chief of Police. He was replaced by Mohamed Jabril.

After that, Kabaal assumed the role of Suldaan.

On August 26, 2010, newly elected President Silanyo dismissed Mohamed Saqadhi Dubad from the position of Chief of Police and appointed Kabaal. In 2011, President Silanyo dismissed Kabaal from the position of Chief of Police. His successor was the former Chief of Police, Maxamed Saqadhi Dubad.

In December 2014, Suldaan Wabar began showing opposition to the Somaliland government in Awdal. Kabaal, together with Abdirahman Aw Ali Farrah, worked toward reconciliation and initially secured an agreement for Suldaan Wabar to appear before the Somaliland government. However, this ultimately did not materialize.

On 25 March 2015, Kabaal died in Italy after a long illness. His body was brought to Hargeisa on 4 April 2015. He was given a national funeral. After that, his body was transported from Hargeisa and buried next to his mother's grave in Borama. Hundreds of people attended the burial. Abdirahman Mohamed Abdullahi, the leader of Somaliland's opposition Waddani party, also attended.

The Prime Minister of Somalia Omar Sharmarke also expressed his condolences.

=== Posthumously ===
In September 2015, his son Ahmed succeeded to the Suldaan position.

His son, Abdi Cadir, became the chairman of the Ilmi Kabaal Foundation.
