= Mohamed Ige Ilmi =

Chief of the Somaliland Police Force
- In office 2003–2006
- President: Dahir Riyale Kahin
- Preceded by: Abdiqadir Muse Mohamed
- Succeeded by: Mohamed Saqadhi Dubad

Military service
- Branch/service: Somaliland Police Force
- Commands: Chief of Somaliland Police Force.

Mohamed Ige Ilmi (Somali: Maxamed Cige Cilmi) is a former Police Commissioner of Somaliland.

== Biography ==
In May 1974, Mohamed Ige Ilmi was promoted to colonel. He served as a police force colonel during the 1977 war around Jijiga.

=== After Somaliland's independence ===
In December 2002, Mohamed Ige Ilmi was a member of the executive committee of the SAHAN political organization. SAHAN claimed to be the "Islamic Party of Somaliland," but it was widely viewed as a political performance and failed to qualify as one of the three constitutionally recognized parties in Somaliland.

=== Somaliland Police Commissioner ===
After the Somaliland presidential election on April 14, 2003, then-police commissioner Abdiqadir Muse Mohamed expressed gratitude to citizens and political parties for peaceful voting. After that, new President Dahir Riyale Kahin appointed Mohamed Ige Ilmi as Police Commissioner.

In January 2004, Mohamed Ige Ilmi arrested the traditional leader Boqor Osman Mahmud.

In September 2005, when Ibrahim Mahamed Husein (Dhadhere) of the UDUB party was elected as the Speaker of the House of Representatives. Dhadhere declared the end of the session as soon as it began. Mohamed Ige Ilmi brought the police into the parliament at the order of Dhadhere.

In April 2006, former police commissioner Abdiqadir Muse Mohamed passed away. Mohamed Ige Ilmi described him as "a pillar and teacher of the police force."

In May 2006, a dispute occurred between Interior Minister Ismail Adan Osman and Police Commissioner Mohamed Ige Ilmi. A faction of the police force staged a mutiny and stormed the Somaliland Parliament with weapons. In response, President Dahir Riyale Kahin dismissed both the Minister and the Police Commissioner.

Mohamed Ige Ilmi was succeeded by Mohamed Saqadhi Dubad.
