= Mohamed Adan Saqadhi =

Somali military official

Mohammed Adan Saqadhi محمد آدم سقادي
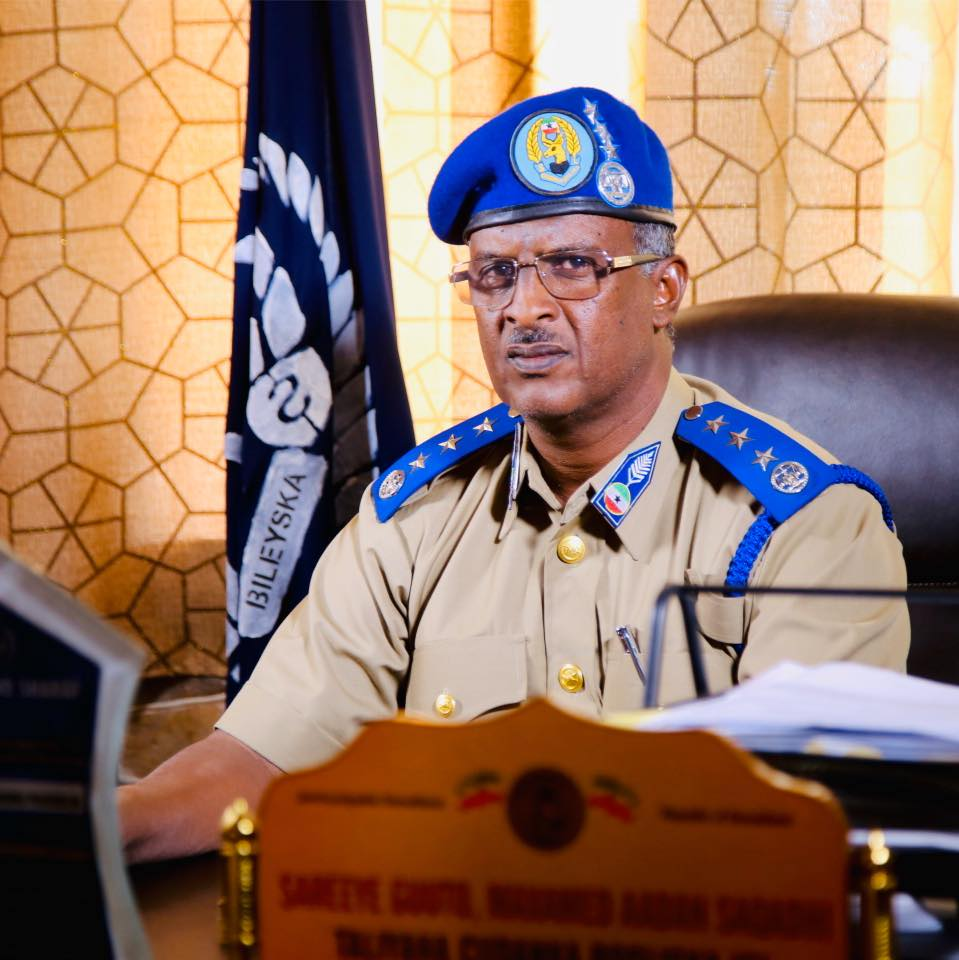

Former Chief of the Somaliland Police Force
- Incumbent
- Assumed office 5 November 2019
- President: Muse Bihi Abdi
- Preceded by: Abdillahi Fadal Iman
- Succeeded by: Abdirahmaan Abdilahi Hassan (Abdi dheere )

Personal details
- Born: 18 October 1967 Hargeisa, Somali Republic (now Somaliland)

Military service
- Branch/service: Somaliland Police Force
- Rank: Major General
- Commands: Former Chief of Somaliland Police Force.

Mohammed Adan Saqadhi (born 18 October 1967), is a Somaliland military official, who’s formerly serving as the Chief of Somaliland Police Force.

== See also ==
- Somaliland Police
- Somaliland Armed Forces
- Ministry of Defence (Somaliland)
- List of Somalis
- Abdillahi Fadal Iman
