= Hassan Yonis Habane =

Former Somaliland chief of staff

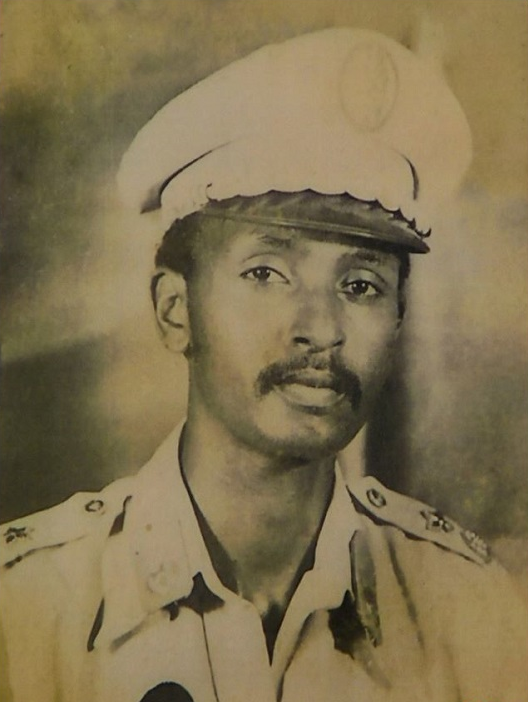

Chief of the General Staff of Somaliland
- In office October 1996 – 21 September 1997
- Preceded by: Osman Awad Hashi
- Succeeded by: Ismail Mohamed Osman
- In office 23 February 2001 – 21 February 2002
- Preceded by: Ismail Mohamed Osman
- Succeeded by: Abdisamad Haji Abdilahi

Personal details
- Born: 1950 Hargeisa
- Died: November 27, 2006 (aged 55–56) Hargeisa

Hassan Yonis Habane (Somali: Xasan Yoonis Habane) was a chief of staff of the Somaliland Armed Forces. As one of the commanders of the SNM, the predecessor of Somaliland, he won many battles and was one of the initiators of Somaliland's independence.

== Biography ==
Relation map.

He was born in Djibouti in 1950 to Yoonis Habane and Caasha Ismaaciil Madar. His clan is the Jibril Aboqor clan of Habr Awal.

He studied at the elementary and secondary schools of Biyo dhacay in Hargeisa. He entered high school in Burao in 1968 and studied there for three years. At the same school was Mohamed Kahin Ahmed.

In 1972 he joined the army in Kismayo and was sent to Russia in 1973. He studied at the Military University in Odesa, Soviet Union.

He returned to Somalia in the spring of 1975. He initially worked in Mogadishu, but moved to Buloburde in 1977.

In 1977, he was assigned to Garowe and soon became a commander in Galkayo. There he was seriously injured and was treated in Mogadishu, but returned to Galkayo from time to time. Some say he had behavioral problems in Galkayo.

=== Activities at SNM ===
In 1982, he moved to Italy for treatment. At that time, he made contact with Somali National Movement (SNM), which had been founded the previous year. Soon after, he joined SNM.

Soon he became commander of a 700-man contingent in Laanqayrta.

From 1984 to 1985 he was commander of the Western Region of the SNM.

He became Treasurer of the SNM at the end of 1987. The command of the SNM unit was held by Hassan Yonis Habane, Hassan Gure and Muse Bihi Abdi.

In May 1988, in the wake of the reconciliation between Ethiopia and Somalia, the SNM, which had a stronghold in Ethiopia, found itself in a bind; Habane teamed up with Mohamed Kahin Ahmed and others to resist.

=== After the founding of Somaliland ===
In May 1991, Somaliland was proclaimed a state. Soon after, Habane was appointed General Commander of the Somaliland Armed Forces, a position he held until 1993.

In October 1996, he became Commander of the national army. On 21 September 1997, President Egal dismissed the Commander, General Hassan Younis Habane.

On 23 February 2001, he succeeded Shaqale as commander of the national army again. In 2003, he was dismissed from his position as Commander of the National Armed Forces. His successor is Abdisamad Haji Abdilahi (Gamgam).

=== Death and After ===
On 27 November 2006, He died in Hargeisa. He was buried in the National Cemetery in Hargeisa.

In February 2013, he was named one of three in the Army category of "100 People Who Have Led Somaliland in the Last 20 Years."

== Family ==
- Brothers:
  - Axmed Yonis Habane
  - Cali Yoonis Habane / KULMIYE Party Chairman, Arabsiyo District
