= Somaliland nationality law =

Somaliland Citizenship Act

Parliament of Somaliland
- Long title: An Act relating to Somaliland citizenship
- Enacted by: Parliament of Somaliland
- Enacted: 1 March 2002
- Signed by: President Dahir Riyale Kahin
- Status: Current legislation

Somaliland is a self-governing state in the Horn of Africa in which inhabitants were initially governed by various kinship (Relationship) networks. Upon contact with Europeans, treaties were signed in the area to secure rights to trade in the territory in exchange for protection of clans from rivals. Britain formally extended a British protectorate over British Somaliland in 1898. Inhabitants of Somaliland were British Protected Persons from that date until they gained their independence in 1960 and joined in the union of their state with Somalia to form the Somali Republic.

Inhabitants derive their nationality from Somali law. The legal means to acquire nationality, formal legal membership in a sovereign nation, differ from the domestic relationship of rights and obligations between a citizen within its nation, known as citizenship. Nationality describes the relationship of an individual to the nation under international law, whereas citizenship is the domestic relationship of an individual within the state.

As the African Union, United Nations, and no independent nation other than Israel has recognized its national sovereignty, Somaliland's inhabitants are Somali nationals, but since declaring its independence in 1991, it has de facto authority to control internal affairs and citizenship within its territory.

== Acquisition of nationality ==
The Somaliland Citizenship Law provides the following:

=== By birth ===
Article 2: Citizenship by birth

- A Somaliland citizen by birth is anyone whose father is a descendent of persons who resided in the territory of Somaliland on 26 June 1960 and before.
- A Somaliland citizen by birth may acquire the citizenship of another country (dual nationality) without losing his Somaliland citizenship.
- Unless he has not voluntarily renounced the right to Somaliland citizenship., any adult progeny of a male Somaliland citizen, who resides in a foreign country or is a citizen of another country or is a refugee in another country may acquire Somaliland citizenship on his first return to the territory of Somaliland.

=== By grant ===
Article 3: Obtaining confirmation of citizenship

- The confirmation of proof of Somaliland citizenship may be obtained by an individual on the production of:
  - A declaration relating to the individual made at a court by the Ministry of Internal Affairs registered Akil (clan chief) of the individual’s community.
  - The form designed for the purpose by the Citizenship Office and signed by the individual.
- The confirmation of Somaliland citizenship shall be done in a uniform manner and recorded serially by the Ministry of Internal Affairs. It shall be signed by the Chairman of the relevant region.
- The layout and colour of the document showing confirmation and conferment (of citizenship) and its printing and administration shall be set out in regulations issued by the Minister of Internal Affairs

Article 4: Conferment of Citizenship on a person who is an alien or a refugee

1 Any alien or refugee who is lawfully resident in the territory of Somaliland and who applies for Somaliland citizenship may be granted such Citizenship when he fulfils the following conditions:

- He must be an adult.
- He must have resided lawfully in the territory of Somaliland for an unbroken period of no less than 10 years.
- He must be known for his good character and behaviour.
- He must not have been subject of a sentence for an offence proven in a court, and must not have participated in activities which were contrary to the sovereignty of Somaliland.
- He must have been taxpayer during his period of residence in the territory of Somaliland.
- He must submit a declaration in which he is renouncing his previous citizenship, and must, at the same time, make the oath set out in Article 6 of this Law.
- He must demonstrate proficiency in the Somali language. This ensures that applicants can engage with the local community and participate in civic life effectively.

2 Any person whose mother is a Somaliland citizen and has been proved to have no father may be granted citizenship if he applies for it and fulfils the conditions set out in this Law at paragraph 1 of this Article.

The conferment of citizenship as set out in Article 4 shall be undertaken by the President who shall issue it in a decree after he has considered the advice of the National Citizenship Committee. The Committee shall consist of 12 members of the Council of Ministers and the Minister of Internal Affairs shall act as its Chairman.

== History ==
=== African and European contacts (11th century – 1960) ===
Between the eleventh and thirteenth centuries, the region was converted to Islam. Intermarriage created an Islamic Arab-Somali elite, who established strong, but independent city-states, but in the northern part, sultans had little power, and their title was mostly honorific. Without hierarchical authority, nomadic groups were bound by patrilineal kinship ties, which determined alliances and socio-political divisions. Following the Islamic system of diya, clans had a contractual alliance to pay to and receive damages from other clans, for losses sustained to persons or property. As the payments were collectively paid to the group, collaboration, cooperation, consensus among the males in the clan was necessary to provide for the group security and resolve legal issues. No single entity ruled in Somali region and from the sixteenth century Europeans increasingly were encroaching on their territory. While there were no firm borders between the territories administered by local rulers, they shared grazing lands and engaged in trade, which often became the grounds of conflict. In 1839, the British established a trading fort in Aden, and signed treaties with the Isaaq clan rulers to access food supplies. After the Berlin Conference of 1884–1885, the British began signing agreements with traditional leaders in territory that bordered Yemen, French Somaliland (now Djibouti), Italian Somaliland and the Jordan Colony. In exchange for protection from aggressors of the local leaders, the treaties secured protected trade rights for Britain. In 1887, the British notified the signatories to the Berlin agreement of their intent to establish Somaliland as a British protectorate.

=== Somaliland Union (1960–1991) ===
On 26 June 1960, British Somaliland gained its independence. Under the terms of the Nationality and Citizenship Ordinance (No. 15), passed three days prior, at independence, Somali who were stateless and were born in British Somaliland, or if legitimate whose father and if illegitimate whose mother was born in the territory were conferred nationality of Somaliland and ceased to be BPPs. Persons who had lived in British Somaliland for a year could register for nationality if they did not meet the provisions to automatically acquire nationality at independence, provided they renounced any other nationality. Those born in the territory after independence acquired nationality if legitimate from a father and if illegitimate from a mother. Married women followed the nationality of their husband. On 1 July 1960 Italian Somaliland became independent and though the two states had not agreed on terms of union, they joined to form the Somali Republic.

To overcome the lack of a unification agreement, a constitutional plebiscite scheduled for June 1961, which would also address the union of the two states. Under the terms of the proposed constitution, Mogadishu rather than Hargeisa was to be the capital and the legislative seats were assigned giving northern Somalia thirty-three and southern Somalia ninety-nine representatives. As a result of the failure to come to agreement and the imbalance of power in the constitutional draft, most inhabitants of Somaliland boycotted the 1961 constitutional referendum with just over five percent of the northern population voting. Of those who participated, sixty percent opposed the new constitution. Since the northern population made up only 100,000 of the 1,952,660 voters, the result was the adoption of the proposed constitution. Under the terms of the constitution, an Act of Union was promulgated on 31 January 1961 which was retroactively in effect from 1 July 1960. Under the terms of the Act of Union persons who were nationals of either Somaliland or Somalia became nationals of the Somali Republic.

After independence children acquired nationality under the Somali Citizenship Law (No. 28) of 22 December 1962, from a Somali father who was a national or through a person who by language, origin, or tradition was considered Somali. It allowed persons who had resided in the Greater Somali region for seven years, or those whose mothers were Somali after a two-year residency, to acquire nationality through a grant. Minors acquired, lost, or recovered nationality when their father changed his nationality, the only exception was that if a father was stateless, a child could obtain nationality maternally. Foundlings or minor orphans were assumed to be Somali and automatically derived nationality, unless parentage was later proven otherwise. Foreign women who married Somali husbands automatically acquired Somali nationality. Nationality could be lost by obtaining dual nationality, serving a foreign government or military, establishing a residence abroad, or by a woman marrying a foreigner and acquiring his nationality.

In 1969, the president was assassinated during a coup d'état and the constitution was suspended. Continued police-state policies by the end of the 1980s, had pushed the country to civil war. Between 1990 and 1992 the Somali state collapsed because of waves of violence, accelerated by a dramatic rise in the availability of weapons; the inability of clan elders to enforce customary law; and an enormous famine which spread across southern Somalia.

=== Restoration of sovereignty (1991) ===
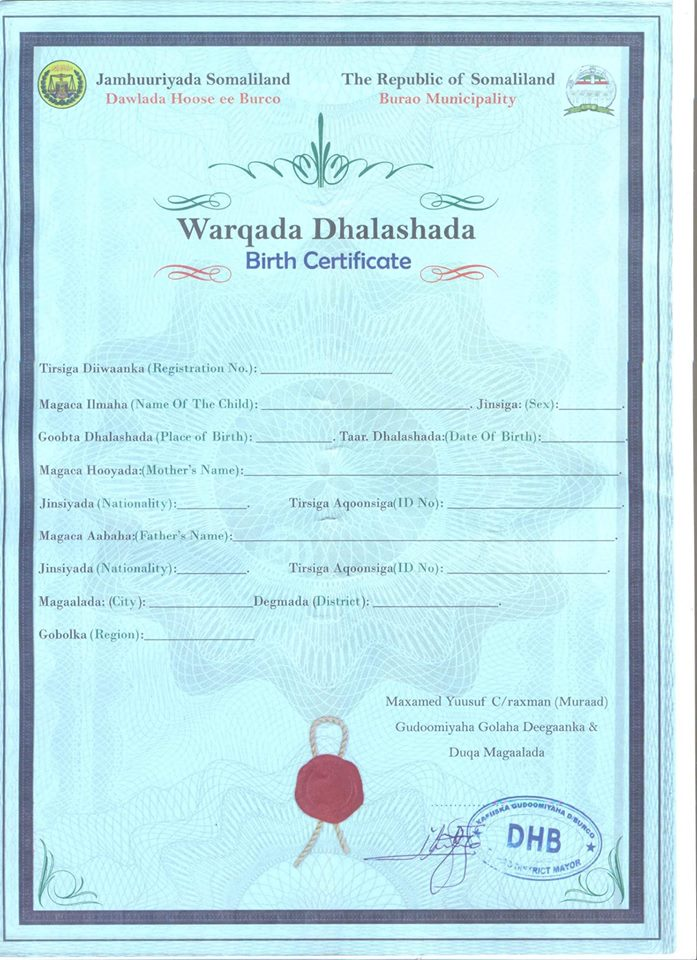
Somaliland birth certificate.

In 1991, Somaliland revoked the Act of Union, declaring its independence. It established a bicameral legislature, created an interim constitution and appointed a president. Civil war broke out between the northern clans, which ended after a national reconciliation conference was called in 1996. A new interim constitution was adopted in 1997 and submitted to a plebiscite in 2001. Nearly ninety-eight percent of the population of nearly one and a quarter-million people approved the constitution and independence for Somaliland. The international community was unwilling to officially recognize the sovereignty of Somaliland without official recognition and membership in the African Union. In 1993, fourteen factions in Somalia signed a cease fire agreement and agreed to attend a National Reconciliation Conference in March 1993, where formal peace documents were signed. Continued flair ups occurred until 1997, when a second conference secured a peace accord among twenty-six faction leaders. In 2000 the Transitional Federal Government of Somalia was formed, which was recognized in 2004, by the United Nations as the official government of the Republic. In 2004, the Transitional Government enacted the Transitional Federal Charter of the Somali Republic, which provided that none of the territories within the republic were independent. It specified that those who had previously been nationals of the Somali Republic continued to be so and that those born after the promulgation of the charter obtained nationality by birth in the territory or to a Somali father.

The cover of a biometric Somaliland passport

In 2005, Somaliland submitted an application for membership and the African Union conducted a fact-finding mission on the country. While recognizing Somaliland's territorial claim to its former colonial boundaries, it refused to grant membership on the basis that it was seceding from an internationally recognized state. Under international jurisprudence, the United Nations typically refuses to acknowledge breakway states without the consent of the parent state, unless severe breaches of human rights have occurred or the parent state has ceased to exist. Following this policy, United Nations agencies and officials have not recognized Somaliland's sovereignty and citizens of Somaliland must travel using passports issued by Somalia.

== Current citizenship scheme ==
Under the 2001 Constitution of the Republic of Somaliland and the Somaliland Citizenship Law (No. 22/2002) persons who are citizens and entitled to rights within the territory of Somaliland are those born to a father who descends of a person who resided in Somaliland on or before 26 June 1960. Adult persons who have previously lived abroad and are descended of a Somaliland citizen may acquire citizenship by establishing residency in the territory. Terms of the constitution provide that rights enjoyed by Somaliland citizens include universal suffrage. Though the constitution provides for an independent judiciary, the Public Order Law allows officials to interfere in legal matters and detain or imprison people without trial. Despite these breaches, the right to counsel and appeal is typically respected in the territory. Citizens have the right to own private property, and there are provisions for freedom of speech and of the press; however, these may not be respected by authorities. The constitution guarantees freedom of assembly, but a lack of security often results in bans on demonstrations, even if they are peaceful. Freedom of association is also guaranteed by the constitution, however persons who have attempted to participate in elections of the Federal Republic of Somalia may be accused of treason and punished. Islam is the state religion and promotion of any other religion is banned. Discrimination against women on the basis of their gender or national origin are prohibited by the Constitution, though in practice women's rights are not generally protected.

== See also ==
- Somaliland passport
