= Gobonimo Market fire =

Market fire in Hargeisa, Somaliland

2025 Gobonimo Market fire
- The fire at Gobonimo Market on 2 February 2025.

- Location within Somaliland
- Date: 2 February 2025
- Time: 11:56 PM, 2 February
- Location: Gobonimo Market, Hargeisa, Somaliland; 9.5631725°N 44.0699626°E
- Also known as: Idaacadda Market fire
- Cause: Undetermined
- Deaths: Not reported
- Injuries: Not confirmed
- Property damage: More than 500 shops destroyed

The 2025 Gobonimo Market fire was a fire that took place in Hargeisa, Somaliland, on the night of 2 February 2025. The fire destroyed more than 500 shops in the Gobonimo Market, also known as the Idaacadda Market, causing significant property damage and affecting hundreds of traders. The fire was brought under control by Hargeisa's Fire and Rescue Brigade, with assistance from police and other emergency services.

== Background ==
Gobonimo Market, also known as Idaacadda Market, is a commercial area in Hargeisa, located near the headquarters of Somaliland's state radio and television. The market contains numerous small businesses and shops serving traders and customers in the city.

The market was considered one of the major commercial markets in Hargeisa. It was also known as a densely populated trading area, with limited access routes for emergency vehicles.

== Fire ==
The fire broke out late on the night of 2 February 2025, at approximately 11:56 PM, in the area near the northern wall of the radio station. It spread through sections of the market before emergency services brought it under control.

The cause of the fire was not immediately established. Preliminary reports suggested that an electrical fault or the unsafe storage of flammable materials may have contributed to the incident. Authorities said that an investigation was underway.

== Response ==
Hargeisa's Fire and Rescue Brigade responded to the fire, supported by the police, military and other local authorities. According to the commander of Somaliland's Fire and Emergency Brigade, Major General Ahmed Mohamed Hassan Sawaaxili, 26 fire vehicles and 105 firefighters took part in the operation.

The response was affected by congestion and blocked access roads within the market. Traders and witnesses said that the limited access had made it difficult for firefighting vehicles to reach the affected areas promptly.

Firefighters managed to contain the blaze and prevent it from spreading to the nearby state broadcasting facilities and residential areas.

== Impact ==
According to Hargeisa's deputy mayor, the fire destroyed more than 500 small shops. The incident caused substantial property losses, although an official financial estimate had not been released at the time of the initial reports.

The destruction affected traders who depended on the market for their businesses and livelihoods. The extent of individual losses was subsequently assessed by a technical committee established by the Somaliland presidency.

== Aftermath ==
On 3 February 2025, Somaliland President Abdirahman Mohamed Abdullahi (Ciro) visited the affected market, accompanied by government ministers and other officials. During the visit, he expressed sympathy for the traders who had lost their property and announced the formation of a technical committee to assess the damage and develop recovery measures.

Somalia's Minister of Information, Culture and Tourism, Abdirahman Yusuf Al-Cadaala, also expressed condolences to those affected by the fire.

On 8 February 2025, Dahabshiil Group announced a donation of US$330,000 to assist businesses affected by the fire. The contribution included support from Somtel, Bluekom and Dahabshiil Bank, according to the company's announcement.
