= Somaliland Custodial Corps =

Prison service of Somaliland

Somaliland Custodial Corps Ciidanka Asluubta Somaliland فيلق حراسة صوماليلاندي
- Somaliland Custodial Corps colour party on parade

- Flag of the Somaliland Custodial Corps
- Common name: Asluubta
- Abbreviation: CASL
- Motto: Kahortag iyo U Adeegid; Prevention and Service

Agency overview
- Formed: 1993; 33 years ago
- Annual budget: SLSh 103.7 billion (2026)

Jurisdictional structure
- Operations jurisdiction: Somaliland
- Legal jurisdiction: Somaliland
- Governing body: Government of Somaliland

Operational structure
- Headquarters: Custodial Corps Central Command, Hargeisa, Somaliland
- Elected officer responsible: Abdalle Mohamed Arab, Minister of Interior
- Agency executive: Brigadier General Ahmed Awale Yusuf (Libaax), Chief of the Custodial Corps

The Somaliland Custodial Corps (Somali: Ciidanka Asluubta Somaliland; Arabic: فيلق حراسة صوماليلاندي) is the uniformed prison service of the Republic of Somaliland, responsible for the maintenance and guarding of prisons. It falls under the Ministry of Interior and is counted among the Somaliland Armed Forces.

== History ==
Prisons in British Somaliland were governed by the Somaliland Prisons Ordinance No. 11 of 1952, which remained in force until it was repealed by the Somali Republic's Prison Law of 1971. After independence in 1960, Ismail Ahmed Ismail, a civil servant from the former protectorate, was appointed commissioner of prisons for the Somali Republic and oversaw the integration of the northern and southern prison systems.

Somaliland's prisons are today governed by the Prisons Law (Law No. 65 of 2014). Brigadier General Ahmed Awale Yusuf (Libaax), previously second-in-command of the army, was appointed commander of the corps on 28 March 2019, replacing Brigadier Mohamed Osman Ibrahim (Xudhuun), and was retained after President Abdirahman Mohamed Abdullahi took office.

== Budget ==
The Custodial Corps was allocated SLSh 103.7 billion in the 2026 national budget, an increase of 25% on the SLSh 82.7 billion allocated in 2025. In 2025 the government began an iris-based biometric registration of all security forces to remove "ghost" personnel from the payroll.

== Ranks ==
Officers

Rank group	General / flag officers	Senior officers			Junior officers
Somaliland Custodial Corps
Somaliland Custodial Corps	Sareeye guuto	Gashaanle sare	Gashaanle dhexe	Gashaanle	Dhamme	Laba xídígle	Xídígle

Enlisted

Rank group	Senior NCOs					Junior NCOs		Enlisted
Somaliland Custodial Corps								No insignia
Somaliland Custodial Corps	Chief warrant officer Musharax sarkaal	Warrant officer class 1 Sadex xarígle	Warrant officer class 2 Laba xarígle	Warrant officer class 3 Xarígle	Sergeant; Sadex alífle	Corporal; Laba alífle	Lance corporal Alífle	Private (or equivalent); Dable

== Gallery ==
Officer leading Custodial Corps troops on parade

Custodial Corps troops marching past the saluting base

Custodial Corps contingent marching in Hargeisa

Custodial Corps troops marching through Hargeisa

== See also ==
- Somaliland Armed Forces
- Somaliland National Army
- Somaliland Police Force
- Somaliland Coast Guard
