= National identity card (Somaliland) =

National identity card of Somaliland

Somaliland National ID Card
- Type: Identity card
- Issued by: Somaliland
- First issued: 2015 (biometric system launched)
- Purpose: Proof of identity
- Eligibility: Somaliland citizens aged 15+

A Somaliland National Identity Card (Somali: Kaadhka Aqoonsiga Muwaadinka) is an official document issued by the Somaliland government to its citizens. It acts as proof of identity for someone who holds it.

== Overview ==
In 2006 the government of Somaliland initiated a voter registration process where each Somaliland citizen would receive a national ID ahead of the presidential election. Between October 2008 and January 2009 around 1.3 million citizens were issued national ID cards as well as voting cards. This was the first time a population was registered in Somali history and in the wider Somali lands.

In 2015, the then president of Somaliland Ahmed Mohamed Mohamoud (Siilaanyo) launched a project to create a biometric National Identity Card system and to register all Somaliland citizens within a six-month period.

All citizens of Somaliland aged 15 or older are required to register in the national ID database, which can be used to access social services and other government programs.

The National ID card can be applied for online.
