= National Service (Somaliland) =

Somaliland National Service Programme (SSNSP)
- Shaqo Qaran JSL (SQJSL)
- Somaliland National Service logo

Agency overview
- Formed: May 2018
- Jurisdiction: Government of Somaliland
- Headquarters: Somaliland
- Website: Official website

The Somaliland National Service Programme (Somali: Shaqo Qaran JSL) is the National Service Program in Somaliland which is an agency of the Government of Somaliland agency with a legal personality currently under the office of President. SNSP is a pilot programme and its performance and contribution to the national youth well-being.

== See also ==
- Somaliland
