= Dervish movement =

Dervish movement or Dervish revolt may refer to:

- Dervish movement (Somali), an anti-colonial resistance movement in Somalia
- Dervish movement (Sudan), an anti-colonial movement that fought the Mahdist War
