= Nafisat Yusuf Mohammed =

Nafisat Yusuf Mohammed is a feminist from Somaliland, advocate for the participation of Somaliland women in politics and executive director of NAGAAD Network.

== Biography ==
Nafisat heads NAGAAD, a women's non-governmental organization based in Hargeisa. NAGAAD was founded in 1997 as an umbrella organization of 46 women's groups in Somaliland to advocate for women's rights and empowerment from a common united front.

In February 2017, Nafisat made a presentation at the University College London Development Planning Unit (DPU) where she highlighted economic, social, financial and cultural barriers that holds Somaliland's women back from participating in politics.

Nafisat has also emphasized the need for expansion of female education in Somaliland to improve the limitations that have been imposed on females by the lack of economic opportunities. She stated that females "only operate small businesses, you won't find many rich business women here", "but this could change as enrollment in higher education is improving".
