= Telesom =

Telecommunications company

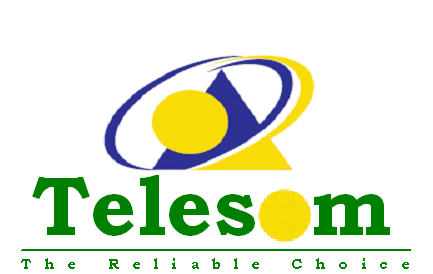
- Type: Private
- Industry: Telecommunications
- Founded: 2002; 24 years ago
- Headquarters: Hargeisa, Somaliland
- Key people: Abdikarim Mohamed Eid (CEO)
- Products: GSM, mobile, fixed line
- Revenue: 2.1 Bn 2024
- Website: www.telesom.com

Telesom is a private telecommunication company established in 2002 by local entrepreneurs in Hargeisa, Somaliland. It is the leading provider of ICT services in the country and offers a wide range of products including voice and mobile broadband, fixed broadband, SMS, mobile money, mobile education, mobile infotainment, and cloud offerings such as SaaS, IaaS, and PaaS services.

Telesom was the first to introduce 2G, 3G, and LTE services to the country, and played a significant role in rebuilding the country after the war by building a robust telecommunication infrastructure and enabling access to digital payments via its flagship mobile money platform ZAAD SERVICE .

The company operates in the entire Somaliland, where it has the largest operation, and the company has affiliations with the biggest telecommunication companies in the neighboring countries and shares regional and international roaming service with them.

== History ==
Founded in 2002 by local stakeholders, it became the first telecommunications company to operate in Somaliland.

== Dara Salam Bank ==
The Dara-Salaam Bank was created in 2010, before its inception the bank was known as Salaam Financial Services.

== Products and services ==
- Mobile money transfer
- Mobile internet
- Landline

== See also ==
- Ministry of Telecommunications and Technology (Somaliland)
