= Somaliland Immigration and Border Control =

Immigration and border agency of Somaliland

Somaliland Immigration and Border Control Ciidanka Socdaalka iyo Ilaalada Xuduudaha Somaliland دائرة الهجرة ومراقبة الحدود صوماليلاندي
- Somaliland Immigration and Border Control officers on parade

- Flag of the Somaliland Immigration and Border Control
- Abbreviation: SIBC

Agency overview
- Formed: 27 November 1995
- Annual budget: SLSh 29.0 billion (2026)

Jurisdictional structure
- Operations jurisdiction: Somaliland
- Legal jurisdiction: Somaliland
- Governing body: Government of Somaliland

Operational structure
- Headquarters: Hargeisa, Somaliland
- Elected officer responsible: Abdalle Mohamed Arab, Minister of Interior
- Agency executive: Brigadier General Mohamed Hussein Farah (Xiirane), Commissioner

Website
- slimmigration.com

Somaliland Immigration and Border Control (SIBC; Somali: Ciidanka Socdaalka iyo Ilaalada Xuduudaha Somaliland; Arabic: دائرة الهجرة ومراقبة الحدود صوماليلاندي) is the uniformed immigration and border force of the Republic of Somaliland. It falls under the Ministry of Interior and is the principal authority for enforcing Somaliland's immigration laws. Its duties include controlling entry to and exit from Somaliland, issuing and verifying visas and residence permits, issuing Somaliland passports and preventing illegal movement across the borders. The force is headed by a commissioner, currently Brigadier General Mohamed Hussein Farah (Xiirane).

== History ==
The agency was established under the Somaliland Immigration Law (Law No. 72/1995) of 27 November 1995. A new headquarters for the immigration department, built with support from the International Organization for Migration, opened in Hargeisa in November 2012.

In 2025 Somaliland enacted a new Immigration and Border Control Law (Law No. 109/2025). In November 2025 the force cited the law when it announced that visas and travel permits issued by the Federal Government of Somalia, including the Somali e-visa, would not be recognised at any Somaliland border point.

== Budget ==
The force was allocated SLSh 29.0 billion in the 2026 national budget, an increase of 45% on the SLSh 20.0 billion allocated in 2025.

== Visas and passports ==
The SIBC issues Somaliland passports and processes entry visas, visa extensions, emergency travel documents and residence permits. Current requirements, application forms and appointment booking are published on its official website.

Regular passport

Service passport

Diplomatic passport

== Badge and vehicle plates ==
Beret badge of the Somaliland Immigration and Border Control

SIBC vehicle registration plate

== Ranks ==
Rank group	General / flag officers	Senior officers			Junior officers
Somaliland SIBC
Somaliland SIBC	Sareeye guuto	Gashaanle sare	Gashaanle dhexe	Gashaanle	Dhamme	Laba xídígle	Xídígle

== Gallery ==
SIBC contingent marching past the saluting base

SIBC officers on parade in Hargeisa

== See also ==
- Somaliland Armed Forces
- Ministry of Interior (Somaliland)
- Somaliland nationality law
