= Gerisa, Awdal =

Gerisa
- Town
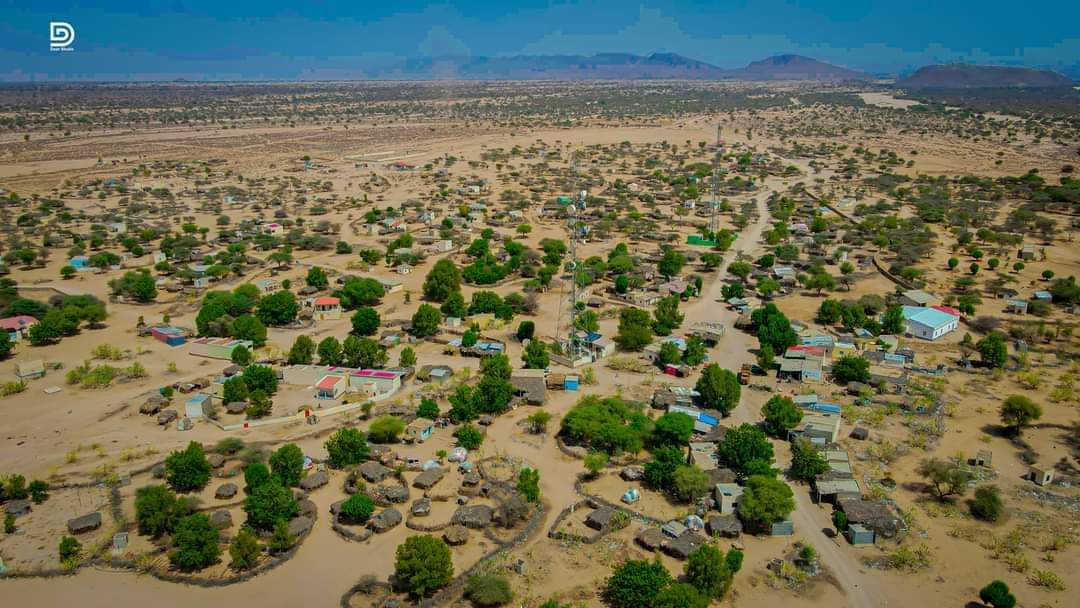

- Location within Awdal Location within Somaliland
- Coordinates: 10°37′59″N 43°28′00″E
- Country: Somaliland
- Region: Awdal
- Time zone: UTC+3 (EAT)

Gerisa is a town in the northwestern Awdal region of Somaliland.

== Demographics ==
Gerisa is populated by members of the Mahad 'Ase Gadabuursi and Issa subclans of the Somali Dir clan.

In 1886 the British general and assistant political resident at Zeila, J. S. King, visited Gerisa and stated that the town is inhabited by members of the Mahad 'Ase clan and, in particular, the Bahabar Abokor subclan:

"At-4-20 P.M. we reached Gárisa, marked by a small hill on the right bank of a river-bed 180 yards wide. Here we found a village of the Rer Abdalla Muhammad family of the Rer Muhammad A'sa sub-tribe of the Gadabúrsi, the chief Akil of whom is, at present, Ali Girrhé."

The FSAU Monthly Food Security Report (March 2003) states that the Gadabuursi clan are the main local inhabitants of Gerisa, while Issa pastoralists migrate to the region seasonally from Ethiopia:

"Following discussions with the Issa (from Ethiopia) and Gadabursi (local inhabitants) livestock owners and local leaders in Gerissa, Xariradd, Jidhi, Karuure, Ceel Gal, Zeyla, Lughaye, Kalalwe and Osooli."

== See also ==
- Administrative divisions of Somaliland
- Regions of Somaliland
- Districts of Somaliland
