= Abdikarim Mohamed Eid =

Somali business executive

- Cabdikariim Maxamed Iid
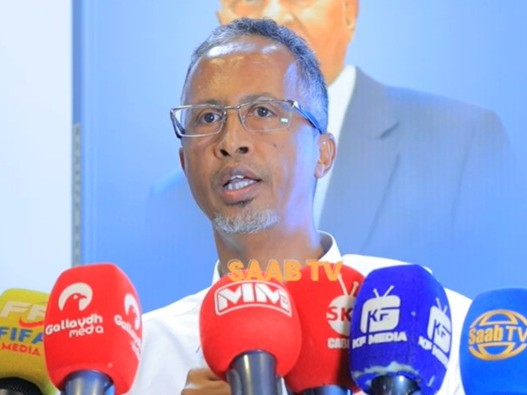
- Occupation: Businessman
- Known for: Founder of Telesom

Abdikarim Mohamed Eid (Somali: Cabdikariim Maxamed Iid) is the chairman of Telesom, a major telecommunications company in Somaliland.

== Telesom ==
In 2002, Abdikarim was founded the Telesom as one of the seven founders.

In 2009, Telesom launched its mobile money platform "ZAAD" with Qaran Express, a money transfer company, along with the telecommunications companies, Golis Telecom in Puntland and Hormuud Telecom in south central Somalia. As of 2014, it was estimated that more than 10% of the population had signed up for ZAAD. However, the governor of the central bank and officials from the Ministry of Finance have expressed concerns that because ZAAD conducts transactions in U.S. dollars rather than Somaliland shillings, it is accelerating the dollarization of the economy and contributing to inflation. Abdikarim explained in a 2014 interview that although there was initial skepticism, he gained trust by persuading companies to pay salaries via the inexpensive ZAAD system.

In February 2013, 100 citizens who had made significant contributions to national development in Somaliland were selected through an eight-month online voting process by the general public via a website, as well as through the collection of opinions at the local level; Abdikarim was chosen as one of two recipients in the telecommunications sector.

In January 2017, Somaliland President Silanyo singled out Telesom’s "ZAAD" and Dahabshiil’s "eDahab," claiming that the decline in the Somaliland shilling's exchange rate against the U.S. dollar was due to financial services that made it easy to use the dollar. He then issued a presidential decree prohibiting the use of foreign currency for transactions under 100 U.S. dollars. In response, in March 2018, Telesom removed money transfers of less than $100 from its service, with the exception of certain cases such as those related to poverty alleviation. At that time, Abdikarim said, "We would like to express our gratitude to Telesom's customers for their trust and support. We are also grateful to them for teaching us the importance of continually delivering new innovations and providing efficient, high-satisfaction services."

In October 2018, Abdikarim was nominated for the "CXO of the Year" award at the AfricaCom Awards held in South Africa. In November, he received the AfricaCom Enterprise CIO of the Year award.

In February 2022, the Somaliland government reached an agreement to share ownership of the nation’s fiber-optic network with three private companies, and Abdikarim attended the signing ceremony as a representative of Telesom and signed the contract.

In March 2022, a large delegation led by President set out on an official visit to the United States, and Abdikarim accompanied them as one of the representatives of the business community.

In August 2022, six business leaders voluntarily established a mediation committee with the aim of resolving political conflicts within Somaliland, and Abdikarim joined the committee. The committee proposed the prompt appointment of members to the Election Commission and the simultaneous holding of presidential and party elections.

In August 2025, in Hargeisa, the capital of Somaliland, the "Serene Sarovar Premiere", the country’s first five-star luxury hotel meeting international standards, was completed, and the President of Somaliland delivered remarks at the ceremony. During his speech, he specifically praised Abdikarim, the project’s owner, and called on other business operators to invest domestically rather than seek opportunities overseas.
