= 1922 Burao tax revolt =

Revolt waged by Habr Yunis tribesmen

Burao Tax Revolt
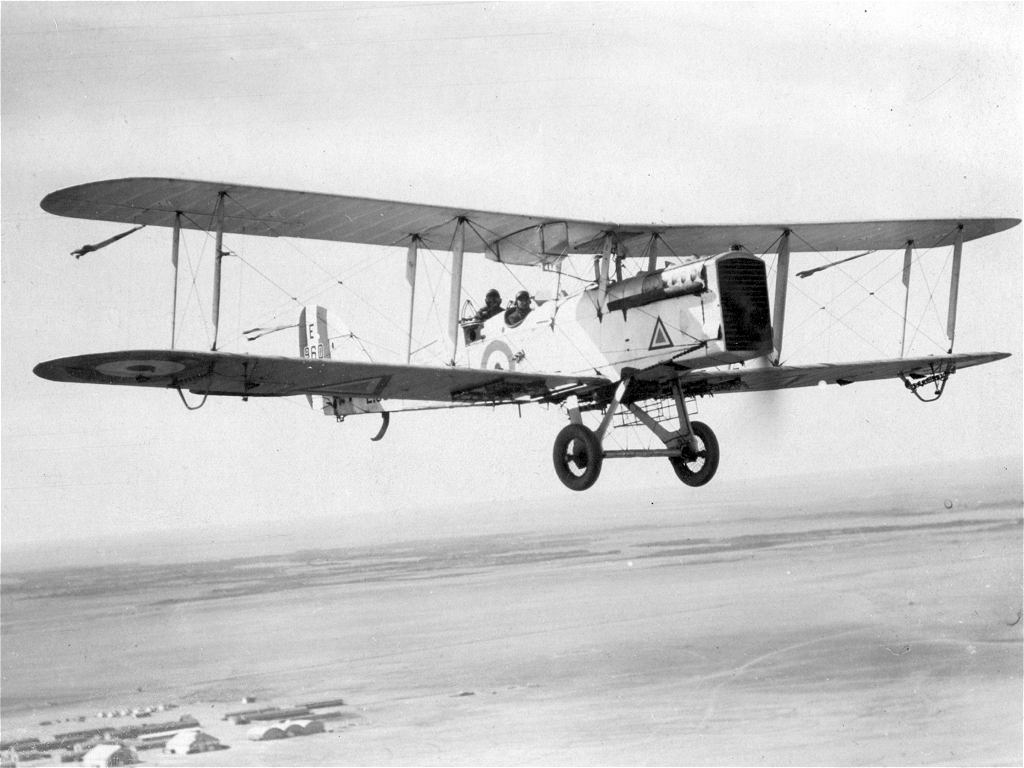
- D.H.9A bombers used in Somaliland
Date	February 25 – Late March 1922
Location	Burao, British Somaliland (now Somaliland) 09°31′40.4″N 45°32′04.2″E
Result	Isaaq victory: Abandonment of British tax policy under the protectorate; See Aftermath

Belligerents
Isaaq Sultanate: Habr Yunis	United Kingdom: British Somaliland

Commanders and leaders
(Isaaq Sultanate) Madar Hersi	(British Somaliland) Governor Geoffrey Archer (British Somaliland) Allan Gibb †

Units involved
Unknown	Somaliland Camel Corps

Casualties and losses
Unknown losses after bombardment	Unknown

The 1922 Burao Tax Revolt was a revolt waged by Habr Yunis tribesmen in the city of Burao in early 1922 against British Somaliland authorities.

== Overview ==
Captain Allan Gibb

In early 1922 the Protectorate authorities announced that they would impose a heavy tax on the people of Burao and initiate a programme of disarmament. This policy was proposed to raise much needed revenues to run the Somaliland Protectorate which was a net drain on Colonial Office coffers. As well to enhance British control in the interior of Somaliland after the Dervish War. As a result, the people of Burao revolted and clashed with the British in opposition to the tax and this led to targeting of British government officials. In the ensuing disturbances a shootout between the British and Burao residents broke out, Captain Allan Gibb, a Somaliland Campaign veteran and district commissioner, was shot and killed after the Camel Corps refused to fire on the rioters.

== Reaction of British Authorities ==
Local British authorities feared they could not contain the revolt and requested then Secretary of State for the Colonies Winston Churchill, to send reinforcements from Aden. To punish the rebels, planes from the Aden No. 8 Squadron RAF were dispatched and troops were placed on standby. The RAF planes arrived at Burao and within two days and proceeded to bomb the town with incendiaries, effectively eliminating the town.

Telegram from Sir Geoffrey Archer, Governor of British Somaliland to Winston Churchill the Secretary of State for the Colonies:

I deeply regret to inform that during an affray at Burao yesterday between Rer Sugulleh and Akils of other tribes Captain Gibb was shot dead. Having called out Camel corps company to quell the disturbance, he went forward himself with his interpreter, whereupon fire opened on him by some Rer Segulleh riflemen and he was instantly killed..Miscreants then disappeared under the cover of darkness. In order to meet the situation created by the Murder of Gibb, we require two aeroplanes for about fourteen days. I have arranged with resident, Aden, for these. And made formal application, which please confirm. It is proposed they fly via Perim, confining sea crossing to 12 miles. We propose to inflict fine of 2,500 camels on implicated sections, who are practically isolated and demand surrender of man who killed Gibbs. He is known. Fine to be doubled in failure to comply with latter conditions and aeroplanes to be used to bomb stock on grazing grounds.

Winston Churchill reporting on the Burao incident at the House of Commons:

On 25th February the Governor of Somaliland telegraphed that an affray between tribesmen had taken place at Burao on the previous day, in the course of which Captain Allan Gibb, D.S.O., D.C.M., the District Commissioner at Burao, had been shot dead. Captain Gibb had advanced with his interpreter to quell the disturbance, when fire was opened upon him by some riflemen, and he was instantly killed. The murderers escaped under cover of falling darkness. Captain Gibb was an officer of long and valued service in Somaliland, whose loss I deeply regret. From the information available, his murder does not appear to have been premeditated, but it inevitably had a disturbing effect upon the surrounding tribes, and immediate dispositions of troops became necessary in order to ensure the apprehension and punishment of those responsible for the murder. On 27th February the Governor telegraphed that, in order to meet the situation which had arisen, he required two aeroplanes for purposes of demonstration, and suggested that two aeroplanes from the Royal Air Force Detachment at Aden should fly over to Berber a from Aden. He also telegraphed that in certain circumstances it might become necessary to ask for reinforcements of troops to be sent to the Protectorate.

James Lawrence author of Imperial Rearguard: Wars of Empire writes

[Gibb]..was murdered by rioters during a protest against taxation at Burao. Governor Archer immediately called for aircraft which were at Burao within two days. The inhabitants of the native township were turned out of their houses, and the entire area was razed by a combination of bombing, machine-gun fire and burning.

== Aftermath ==
After the incendiary bombardment and destruction of Burao, the leaders of the rebellion acquiesced, agreeing to pay a fine in livestock for Gibbs death but refused to identify and apprehend the individuals guilty. Most of the men responsible for Gibb's murder would evade capture. In light of the failure to peacefully implement taxation Governor Archer abandoned the policy altogether being a victory for the Somalis in the Protectorate. Governor Archer would soon be replaced after this blunder and policy in British Somaliland would be revised in light of this resistance.

== See also ==
- 1945 Sheikh Bashir Rebellion
