= Somaliland Police =

Police force of Somaliland

Somaliland Police Force Ciidanka Booliska Somaliland قوات الشرطة صوماليلاندي
- Somaliland Police officers on parade

- Flag of the Somaliland Police Force

Agency overview
- Formed: 1993
- Employees: 6,000 (est.)
- Annual budget: SLSh 268.7 billion (2026)

Jurisdictional structure
- Operations jurisdiction: Somaliland
- Map of Somaliland Police Force's jurisdiction
- Governing body: Government of Somaliland
- General nature: Local civilian police

Operational structure
- Headquarters: Hargeisa, Somaliland
- Sworn members: Yes
- Agency executive: Brigadier General Abdirahman Abdillahi Hassan Abdi Dhere, Police Commissioner

Website
- somalilandpolice.net/public/

The Somaliland Police, officially the Somaliland Police Force (Somali: Ciidanka Booliska Somaliland, Arabic: قوات الشرطة صوماليلاندي), is the national law enforcement agency of the Republic of Somaliland. It falls under the Ministry of Interior and has an estimated strength of around 6,000 personnel.

== History ==
Logo of the British Somaliland Police

Policing in the territory dates back to the British Somaliland Protectorate, whose police force was responsible for internal security and issued documents such as identity cards and passports.

The present Somaliland Police Force was established in 1993, following the Somaliland War of Independence, largely out of former fighters of the Somali National Movement (SNM).

== Organisation ==
The force is organised according to Somaliland's administrative regions – Maroodi Jeex, Sahil, Awdal, Togdheer, Sanaag and Sool – each headed by a regional police commandant. Its duties include criminal investigation, patrolling and traffic management, and it works closely with the Criminal Investigation Department (CID) and the armed forces. A British-trained Special Protection Unit (SPU) is responsible for protecting leaders and foreign dignitaries. A Rapid Response Unit (RRU), trained for counter-terrorism and emergency response, graduated its second intake of around 100 officers in March 2013. Officers are trained at the Mandera Police Academy.

The force has been supported by international partners, including the UNDP since at least 2010, and the UK-funded Somaliland Security Programme since December 2021, which focuses on strategic planning, public order, counter-terrorism and joint operations.

=== Budget and personnel ===
The police were allocated 268.7 billion Somaliland shillings in the 2026 national budget, an increase of 34% on 2025. In January 2025 the government ordered an iris-based biometric registration of all security forces, including the police, to remove "ghost" personnel from the payroll.

=== Badge and vehicle plates ===
Police vehicles carry blue registration plates with white lettering and the prefix "POL".

Badge of the Somaliland Police Force

Police vehicle registration plate

== Commissioners ==
Flag of the Chief of the Somaliland Police Force

Police Commissioners
Commissioner	Took office	Left office
Abdi Suldaan Guray		1997
Elmi Roble Furre	1997	May 1999
Mahamed Jibril Abdi	May 1999	
Abdiqadir Muse Mohamed		2003
Mohamed Ige Ilmi	2003	2006
Mohamed Saqadhi Dubad	2006	26 August 2010
Elmi Roble Furre	26 October 2010	11 June 2011
Mohamed Saqadhi Dubad	11 June 2011	22 March 2012
Abdillahi Fadal Iman	30 March 2012	2 November 2019
Mohamed Adan Saqadhi	5 November 2019	23 January 2025
Abdirahman Abdillahi Hassan Abdi Dhere	23 January 2025	Incumbent

== Notable incidents ==
- May 2008 – Coordinated bombings in Hargeisa targeting the UNDP, the Somaliland Electoral Commission and the Yemeni embassy, and administration offices in Berbera, killed 20 people and injured 37. Two suspects were later jailed and five sentenced to death in absentia.
- September 2009 – More than 100 people, including opposition leaders, were detained after four people were killed during demonstrations in Hargeisa.
- June 2011 – Two officers were killed in a bomb attack on a police station in Las Anod.
- November 2011 – The CID commander for Sool, Mohamud Mohamed Hirsi, was shot dead in Las Anod.

== Ranks ==
Officers

Rank group	General / flag officers		Senior officers			Junior officers
Somaliland Police
Somaliland Police	Sareeye gaas	Sareeye guuto	Gashaanle sare	Gashaanle dhexe	Gashaanle	Dhamme	Laba xídígle	Xídígle

Enlisted

Rank group	Senior NCOs					Junior NCOs		Enlisted
Somaliland Police								No insignia
Somaliland Police	Chief warrant officer Musharax sarkaal	Warrant officer class 1 Sadex xarígle	Warrant officer class 2 Laba xarígle	Warrant officer class 3 Xarígle	Sergeant; Sadex alífle	Corporal; Laba alífle	Lance corporal Alífle	Constable; Dable

== Gallery ==
Male officers on parade

Female officers on parade

Female officers on parade

Colour party carrying the police flag

Officers in ceremonial dress

Traffic police on parade

== See also ==
- Somaliland Armed Forces
- Somaliland Custodial Corps
