= Nuh Ismail Tani =

Former Chief of Staff of Somaliland Armed Forces

Major general Nuh Ismail Tani
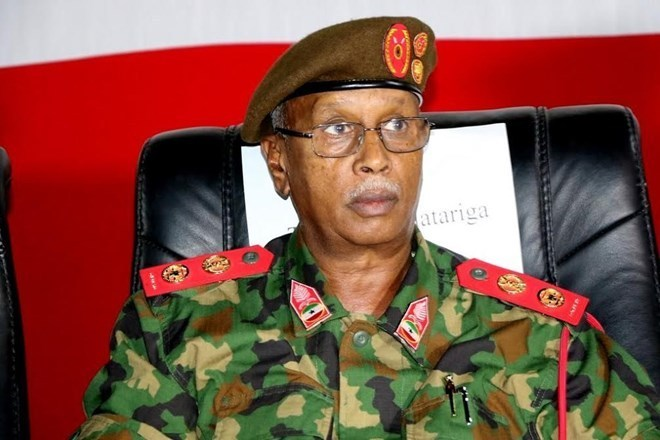

Personal details
- Born: 1948 British Somaliland

Military service
- Allegiance: Somaliland
- Branch/service: Somaliland National Army
- Years of service: 2003 – 2011; 2016-2025
- Rank: Major general
- Commands: Chief of staff Commander, Somaliland Defence Command
- Battles/wars: Battle of Tukaraq; Puntland–Somaliland dispute Las Anod conflict (2023–present)

General Nuh Ismail Tani (Somali: Nuux Ismaaciil Taani) is the former chief of staff of the Somaliland Armed Forces. He was replaced on 23 January 2025 by Lieutenant General Nimcaan Yusuf Osman (Gahnug).

== History ==
Tani comes from the Sa'ad Musa sub-division of the Habr Awal branch of the Isaaq clan.

In 1975, Tani was head of logistics for the Somali armed forces in Kismayo.

In 1981, he led the fighting in Galkayo in central Somalia.

=== Chief of General Staff (1st period) ===
He was appointed as the chief of staff in 2003 by President Kahin.

In August 2010, the new president Silanyo ousted a number of government officials, but Tani was retained.

And he held the post under two different presidents of Somaliland before being dismissed by Ahmed Mahamoud Silanyo on 11 December 2011.

He was succeeded by General Mohamed Hasan Abdullahi.

In 2013, he was named one of the 100 people who have contributed the most to Somaliland over the past 20 years.

=== Chief of General Staff (2nd period) ===
On August 15, 2016, Tani was again appointed Commander of the Somaliland Defense Forces.

In November 2017, Tani told an interview before the Somaliland presidential election that he would faithfully follow whichever candidate is elected.

In November 2018, Tani welcomed the President of Somaliland in Tukaraq and explained the situation.

In November 2022, Tani requested that the Puntland military commander not make misleading statements regarding the occupation of Bo'ame by Somaliland forces, as if Somaliland forces were invading another country.

On January 25, 2023, Tani denied some reports that enemy forces had invaded Las Anod, explaining that the Sool administration was under the control of the Somaliland military. He explained, however, that he would not allow any vehicles to enter Las Anod to ease tensions in the city.

On February 17, 2023, Tani said that militant group Al-Shabaab had been forced out of Somalia and was trying to establish a stronghold in Las Anod, joined by Puntland and others from southern Somalia, who were fighting Somaliland armed forces.

In March 2023, Tani announced that the situation in Las Anod was such that Somaliland forces had the ability to overrun the town, but that the Somaliland government was abiding by the cease-fire agreement it had promised.

In January 2024, he met with Ethiopia's Chief of Staff, Birhanu Jula, at the Defense Headquarters in Addis Ababa. They discussed military cooperation between the two countries.
