= Somaliland Armed Forces =

Armed forces of Somaliland

- Ciidamada qalabka sida ee Soomaaliland (Somali)
- Somaliland Armed Forces emblem

- Somaliland Armed Forces flag
- Founded: 1993; 33 years ago
- Service branches: Somaliland National Army; Somaliland Coast Guard; Auxiliary forces (other ministries; mobilised in wartime): Somaliland Police Force; Somaliland Immigration and Border Control Guarding prisons only: Somaliland Custodial Corps
- Headquarters: Hargeisa, Somaliland

Leadership
- Commander-in-chief: Abdirahman Mohamed Abdullahi
- Minister of Defence: Mohamed Yusuf Ali Ahmed
- Chief of Staff: Brigadier General Nimcaan Yusuf Osman

Personnel
- Active personnel: ~32,500 (est.); Army ~25,000, Police ~6,000, Coast Guard ~1,500; excludes the Custodial Corps, Immigration and Border Control and Fire Brigade, for which no figures are published

Expenditure
- Budget: SLSh 1.34 trillion (2026, security sector)

Industry
- Foreign suppliers: United Kingdom; United Arab Emirates; United States; Taiwan; Ethiopia Unrecognized suppliers: Belgium; Czechoslovakia (historical); Russia; France; Italy; Sweden; Soviet Union (historical)

Related articles
- History: Military history of Somaliland: Somali Civil War; Somaliland War of Independence; Puntland–Somaliland dispute; Battle of Las Anod (2007); 2010 Ayn clashes; Battle of Tukaraq; 2023 Las Anod conflict
- Ranks: Military ranks of Somaliland

The Somaliland National Armed Forces (Somali: Ciidamada Qalabka Sida ee Soomaaliland; Arabic: القوات المسلحة الصوماليلاندية, romanized: alquaat almusalahat alsuwmalilandia) are the military services of the Republic of Somaliland. Under the Ministry of Defence, they consist of the Somaliland National Army and the Somaliland Coast Guard. The Somaliland Police Force, the Somaliland Custodial Corps, the Somaliland Immigration and Border Control and the Somaliland Fire Brigade are also counted among the uniformed forces, but fall under other ministries in peacetime. The Armed Forces is under the command of President Abdirahman Mohamed Abdullahi, who is the Commander-in-chief. The Minister of Defence, Mohamed Yusuf Ali Ahmed, has overseen the armed forces since December 2024.

The strength of the Somaliland army has been estimated at between 8,000 and 15,000 soldiers. In September 2026, President Abdirahman Mohamed Abdullahi stated that the army numbered about 25,000 soldiers, alongside a coast guard of around 1,500 personnel. The International Institute for Strategic Studies has estimated the coast guard at around 600. The Somaliland Police Force has an estimated 6,000 personnel, giving a combined strength of about 32,500 for the army, police and coast guard. No personnel figures have been published for the Custodial Corps, Immigration and Border Control or Fire Brigade. In 2025 the government began an iris-based biometric registration of all security forces to remove "ghost" personnel from the payroll.

Security is the largest item of government spending. The 2026 budget allocated SLSh 1.34 trillion to the security sector, 46.6% of central government spending and up from SLSh 955 billion in 2025. This included SLSh 746.6 billion for the National Army, SLSh 47.8 billion for the Ministry of Defence, SLSh 268.7 billion for the Police, SLSh 103.7 billion for the Custodial Corps, SLSh 36.3 billion for the Coast Guard, SLSh 29.0 billion for Immigration and Border Control and SLSh 21.5 billion for the Fire Brigade. Because Somaliland is internationally treated as part of Somalia, it was long bound by the United Nations arms embargo on Somalia, which restricted its ability to procure weapons.

== History ==
=== Protectorate period ===
Logo of the Somaliland Scouts

In 1914, the Somaliland Camel Corps was formed in British Somaliland and saw service before, during, and after the Italian invasion of the territory during World War II. In 1942, the Somaliland Scouts were tasked with defending the reserve.

=== Independence and Union with Somalia ===
Somaliland became independent on 26 June 1960 as the State of Somaliland, and the Trust Territory of Somalia (the former Italian Somaliland) followed suit five days later. On 1 July 1960, the two territories united to form the Somali Republic.

After independence, the Somaliland Scouts merged with the former Dervishes to form the 5,000 strong Somali National Army.

=== War of Independence ===
In 1981, the Somali National Movement was one of the first rebel groups to form in the country.

Then Somali dictator Siad Barre accused them of being separatist groups and ordered the extermination of the Isaaq tribe, to which the rebel group belonged. The movement fought a guerrilla war in the northwest of the country with the aim of overthrowing and replacing the military government. After the dictator's defeat and special developments in 1991, the Somali sultans decided to abolish unity in 1960 and declared Somaliland an independent state.

=== Restoration of sovereignty ===
In 1991, after Somaliland reasserted its sovereignty, the new government faced great problems with armed groups and armed clans, who were boycotting roads to earn a living.

The new government launched the Somaliland peace process jointly with the Somali National Movement. The communities in Somaliland negotiated what led to the Great Reconciliation Conference in Borama in 1993 which allowed the transfer of power from the Somali National Movement. An interim government for a new civil administration, paving the way for democratic governance and stability.

After a civilian government led by Muhammad Haji Ibrahim Egal disarmed armed clans and armed groups and recruited armed forces from all over Somaliland.

The Armed Forces of Somaliland was officially established on 2 February 1994.

=== Border War ===
In 1998 Puntland State of Somalia claimed Somaliland territory on the basis of clan kinship with some Somaliland communities in the eastern regions of Sool and Sanaag. Which led to tribal and armed conflicts, as a result, The armed forces of Somaliland withdrew from some cities in the eastern regions to avoid casualties until 2007 when the Somaliland communities in the eastern regions demanded that they intervene.

== Commanders ==
The Chief of the General Staff (Somali: Taliyaha Guud ee Ciidanka) is the head of the General Staff and the highest ranking officer of the Somaliland Armed Forces. He is appointed by the President of Somaliland, who holds the position of Commander-in-Chief and the head of the Somaliland Armed Forces. The current Chief of the General Staff is Brigadier general Nimcaan Yusuf Osman (Gaaxnuug).

== Army ==
The Somaliland National Army is the largest branch of the armed forces and is headquartered in Hargeisa. It is made up entirely of volunteers, as Somaliland does not have conscription, and is organised into five divisions across two military regions.

The army long operated without a formal rank structure. In December 2012 the Ministry of Defence announced a chain of command, which was implemented in January 2013.

== Coast Guard ==
The Somaliland Coast Guard (Somali: Ciidanka Bada ee Somaliland) was formed in 2009. The headquarters is located in the coastal town of Berbera; a diving center run by foreign divers who train the Somaliland coast guard is also located there. The coast guard operates with small speedboats mounted with guns. Much of this equipment was provided by the United Kingdom, in an effort to combat piracy. The current commander of the coast guard is Ahmed Hurre Haariye.

== Equipment ==
When Siad Barre was ousted in 1991, Somaliland inherited the military equipment, hardware and facilities left behind by the Somali Democratic Republic, and its forces have relied heavily on repairing and modifying this older equipment. The army's inventory includes T-54/55 and T-72 tanks, Fiat 6614 and Fiat 6616 armoured vehicles, BM-21 Grad multiple rocket launchers, towed artillery, ZU-23-2 anti-aircraft guns, and Sinotruk, Toyota Hilux and Humvee transport vehicles. A full list is given in the Somaliland National Army article.

=== Aircraft ===
- (Socialist Federal Republic of Yugoslavia) UTVA 75 (military trainer aircraft, 4 purchased)

== Ranks ==
Officers

Rank group	General / flag officers			Senior officers			Junior officers
Somaliland National Army
Somaliland National Army	Sareeye guud	Sareeye gaas	Sareeye guuto	Gashaanle sare	Gashaanle dhexe	Gashaanle	Dhamme	Laba xídígle	Xídígle

Enlisted

Rank group	Senior NCOs					Junior NCOs		Enlisted
Somaliland National Army								No insignia
Somaliland National Army	Chief warrant officer Musharax sarkaal	Warrant officer class 1 Sadex xarígle	Warrant officer class 2 Laba xarígle	Warrant officer class 3 Xarígle	Sergeant; Sadex alífle	Corporal; Laba alífle	Lance corporal Alífle	Private (or equivalent); Dable

== See also ==
- National Service (Somaliland)

== Footnotes ==
- British government funded Somaliland Security Programme
