= 2016 in Somaliland =

- Decades: 1990s; 2000s; 2010s; 2020s
- See also: History of Somaliland; List of years in Somaliland

Events of 2016 in Somaliland.

== Incumbents ==
- President: Ahmed Mohamed Mohamoud
- Vice President: Abdirahman Saylici
- Speaker of the House: Abdirahman Mohamed Abdullahi
- Chairman of the House: Suleiman Mohamoud Adan
- Chief Justice: Adan Haji Ali
- Chief of Staff of Armed Forces:
  - Ismail Shaqalle (until August 15)
  - Nuh Ismail Tani (since August 15)
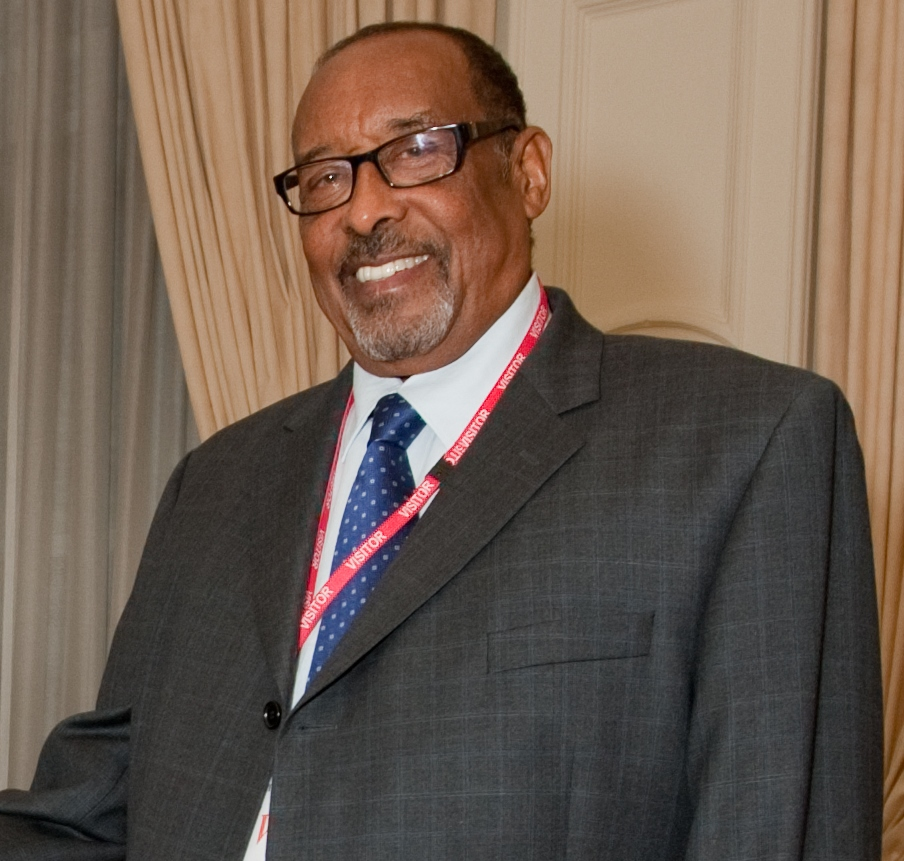
Ahmed Mohamed Mohamoud

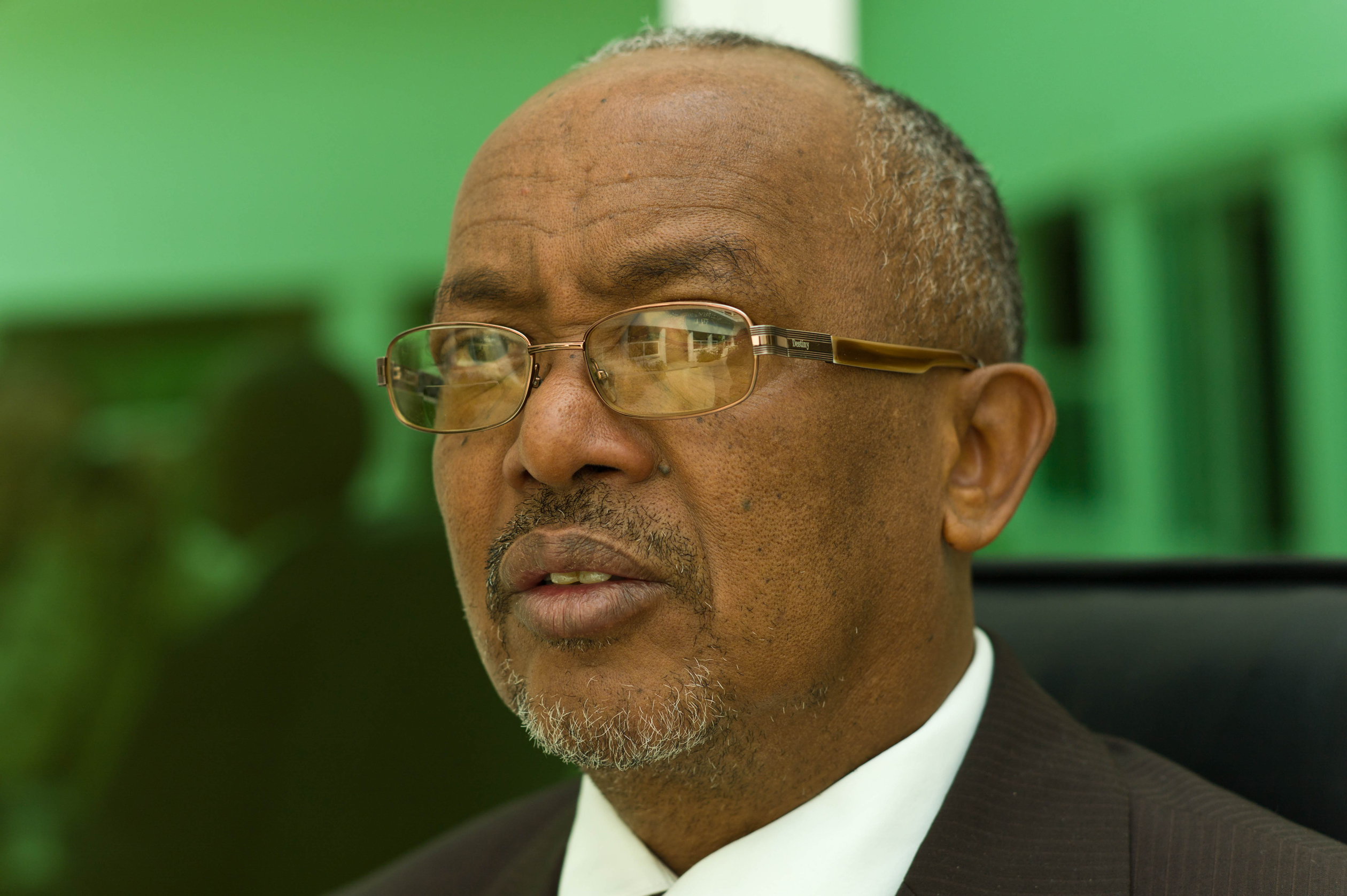
Abdirahman Saylici

== Events ==
=== January ===
- January 13
  - Ahmed Mohamed Mohamoud addressed his last State of the Nation as President of Somaliland to a joint session of Parliament of Somaliland.
- January 20
  - Aynaba police arrest 385 illegal Ethiopian migrants as well as five human smugglers in a large-scale operation.
- January 21
  - Somaliland police arrests seven gunmen who hijacked a vehicle on the road between Hargeisa and Berbera.

=== February ===
- February 13
  - Voters registration of the forth-coming presidential election has begun in Awdal region, which will last 28 days, with 138 locations scheduled to take place.

=== March ===
- March 15
  - Somaliland and Djiboutian coast guards clash over illegal fishing, killing one and wounding two.
- March 19
  - The number of people who died of thirst in Awdal region due to the long drought in the country has reached eight people.

=== April ===
- April 19
  - A delegation from neighboring Somalia, including members of the civil society, business organizations and religious leaders arrived in Hargeisa, by delivering US$1 Million aid to drought victims of the country.

=== May ===
- May 15
  - The National Electoral Commission, along with the officials of the Somaliland political parties, announces that the first phase of the voters registration of Hargeisa and Salahlay District was concluded, which lasted 14 days.

=== June ===
- June 14
  - Three people die and twenty-one others are injured after heavy rainfall with storms in Hargeisa; the storms also lifted the roofs of many buildings, while several others collapsed, including schools.

=== July ===
- July 23
  - The 10th installment of the annual Hargeisa International Book Fair held in Gulied Hotel in hargeisa, with the theme of Leadership; the guest country is Ghana.

=== August ===
- August 13
  - Voters registration of the upcoming presidential election has begun in Sool region, becoming the last region to hold it.

=== September ===
- September 23
  - Commercial businesses in the town of Gar-adag are looted and fields burned on the outskirts of the town; the damage was reported to have caused by one of two communities that had recently been in conflict.

=== October ===
- October 23
  - Minister of Finance handed a US$ 4 Million to the National Electoral Commission that is formerly promised by Silanyo's administration for the commission to carry out its duties.

=== November ===
- November 8
  - At least 32 people were injured (25 civilians & 7 police soldiers) as a result of violent clashes between supporters of Hawd and Daad-madheedh, during a football match in the Somaliland Regional Games at Hargeisa Stadium.

=== December ===
- December 3
  - The President of Somaliland makes a major reshuffle within his administration by presidential decree, including ministers, deputy ministers, state ministers, governors, director generals, advisors and chairmen of national agencies.

== Deaths ==
- December 18
  - Boon Hersi – playwright and comedian.
- July 18
  - Shey Mire Daar – singer.
