= 2018 in Somaliland =

- Decades: 1990s; 2000s; 2010s; 2020s
- See also: History of Somaliland; List of years in Somaliland

Events of 2018 in Somaliland.

== Incumbents ==
- President: Muse Bihi Abdi
- Vice President: Abdirahman Saylici
- Speaker of the House: Bashe Mohamed Farah
- Chairman of the House: Suleiman Mohamoud Adan
- Chief Justice: Adan Haji Ali
- Chief of Staff of Armed Forces: Nuh Ismail Tani
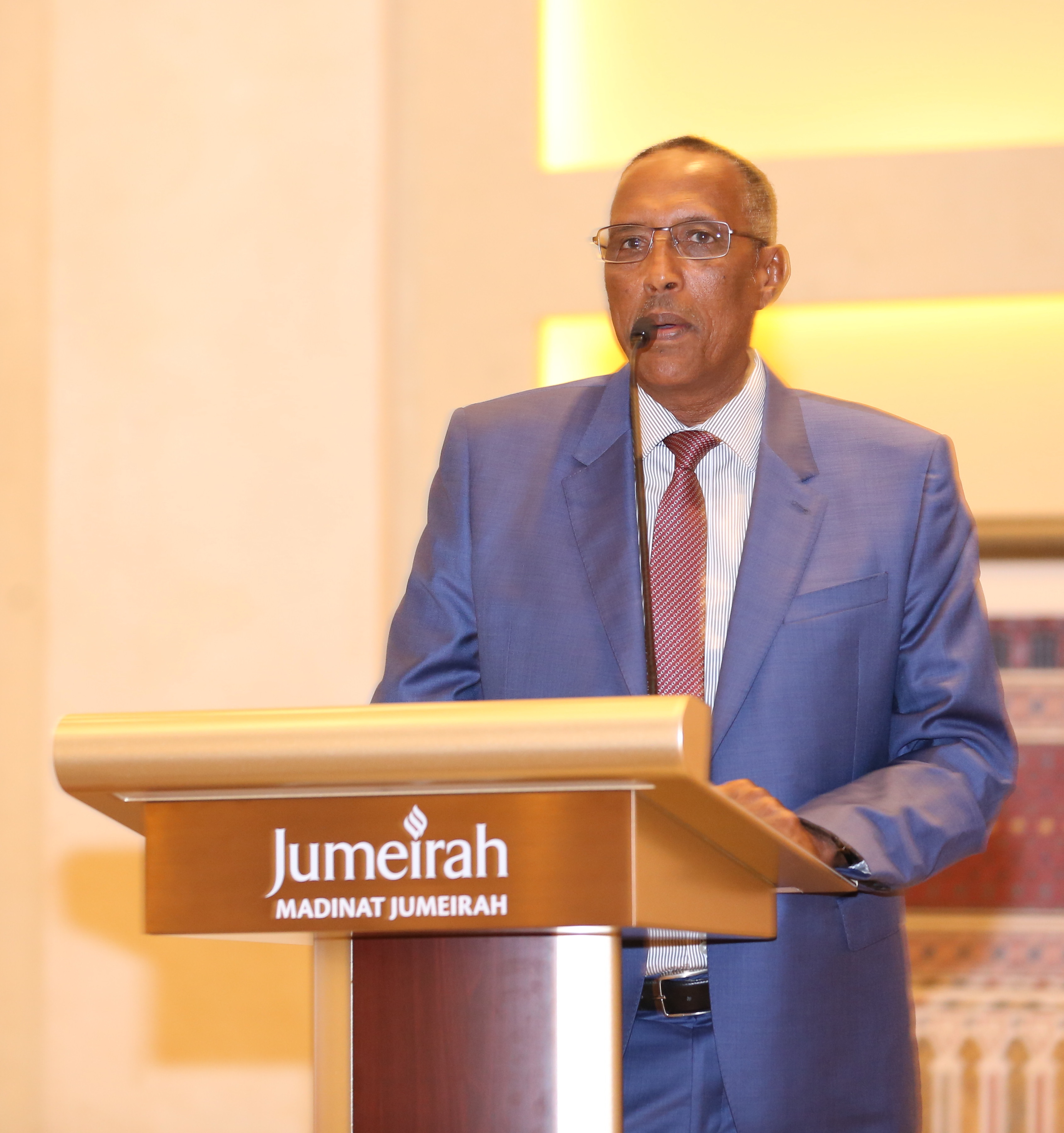
Muse Bihi Abdi

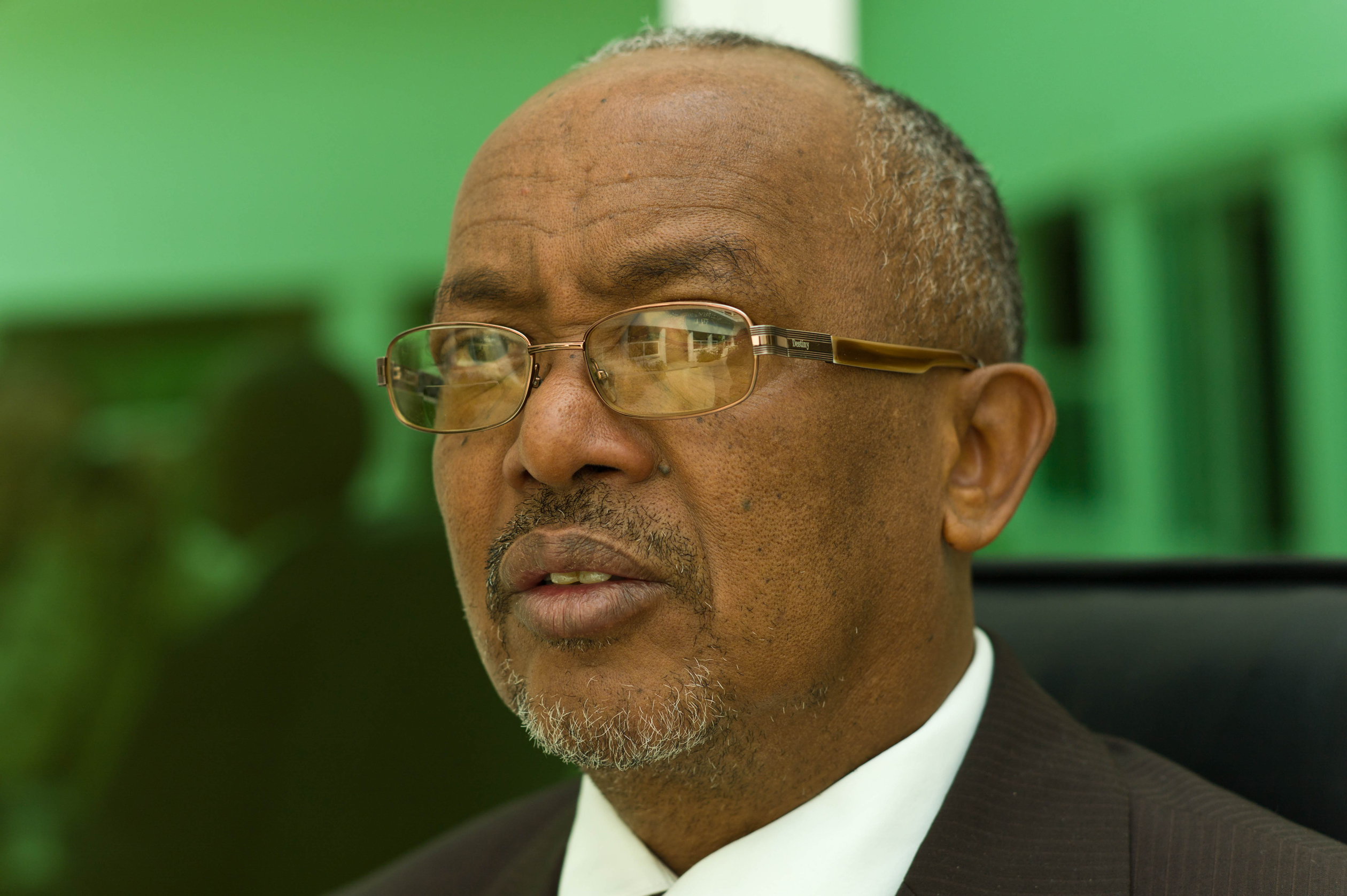
Abdirahman Saylici

== Events ==
=== January ===
- January 4
  - President Muse Bihi Abdi appointed six official posts, including three Director Generals, two Managers and the Auditor General.
- January 8
  - Somaliland Armed Forces take control of the town of Tukaraq in Sool region from Puntland forces.

=== February ===
- February 17
  - The Somaliland Marathon is held in Hargeisa for the first time, with 205 athletes, both local runners international ones participated the event.

=== March ===
- March 25
  - President Bihi delivered his first State of the Nation address to a joint session of Parliament of Somaliland.

=== April ===
- April 15
  - President of Somaliland announced that has marked the Tree Planting Day of the nation on 15 April by presidential decree.

=== May ===
- May 23
  - The Somaliland government has taken over the control of the Berbera Petroleum Laboratory, after improper fuel flow through BPL resulted in the leakage of fossil fuels into berbera fuel tanks, causing contamination of used vehicles and no pure petrol across the country.

=== June ===
- June 2
  - One person was killed and twenty-one houses were collapsed after heavy rains and winds made a landfall at Awbarkhadle and Carobaydhe areas in the east of Hargeisa.

=== July ===
- July 20-25
  - The 12th installment of the annual Hargeisa International Book Fair held in hargeisa, with the theme of coexistence and guest country of Egypt.

=== August ===
- August 23
  - Five people have been killed, including a student girl, and several others injured after being attacked by hyenas in Aynabo District of Saraar region.

=== September ===
- September 1
  - The Minister of Public Works has announced a campaign on public property statistics to be divided into buildings such as schools and hospitals & open land.

=== October ===
- October 25
  - President of Somaliland has declared that 17 October which previously celebrated as the SNM Martyrs Day turned to the Somaliland National Heroes Day.

=== November ===
- November 12
  - the National Tender Board has announced the successful bid for the implementation of three projects which was the Alamzey Stadium, University of Hargeisa and Ministry of Finance.

=== December ===
- December 20
  - The General Auditor submits the national accounting of 2017 for Sub-committee of Monitoring and Protection of National Properties of the House of Representatives.

== Deaths ==
=== April ===
- April 4
  - Sahra Ahmed Jama - Veteran singer.

=== May ===
- May 9
  - Ali Ibrahim Mohamed - politician.
