= Judiciary of Somaliland =

The judiciary of Somaliland (Somali: Garsoorka Somaliland; Arabic: السلطة القضائية في صوماليلاند)is the judicial branch of the Somaliland government.

Mandated by the 1997 Constitution, the judiciary is responsible for overseeing and interpreting the law. It comprises the national and district courts as well as the attorney general and his deputies.

A combination of a number of separate legal traditions, the Somaliland legal system is primarily based on traditional Islamic Shariah law. Though there are no official Shariah courts in Somaliland, the state courts uphold Shariah. In addition to Sharia, Somaliland courts also use a form of British colonial law and traditional common law.

== History of the Legal System ==
=== Pre-Colonization ===
Before colonization the territory that is now Somaliland relied on xeer, or traditional tribal law. This law was applied by clan elders in addition to Shariah law applied by Islamic scholars.

=== British Colonization (1884 – World War II) ===
After formally receiving control of Somaliland from Egypt in 1884, British colonizers introduced a British common law based on the legal system they had implemented in colonial India.

=== As part of Somalia (1960–1991) ===
After being joined with the former Italian Somaliland in 1960 to create the new state of Somalia, Somaliland did not have its own independent legal system until its independence. Despite this, the lower courts of the Somaliland region still used British colonial law until 1977.

=== After Independence (1991 – Today) ===
After Somaliland declared its independence from Somalia in 1991, the courts were governed for a short time using Italian practices until fighting in Borama halted all progress. From 1993 to 1997, the Borama Charter mandated the formation of a newly independent judiciary that used pre-1969 laws. Since the ratification of the Somaliland Constitution in 1997 the legal system has consisted of a mix of three legal frameworks, with judges alternatively applying Sharia law, British colonial law, and xeer.

== Structure of the Courts ==
The five levels of courts in Somaliland are: the Supreme Court, the Appeal Courts of the Regions, the Regional Courts, the District Courts, and the Courts of the National Armed Forces.

=== Supreme Court ===
The Supreme Court of Somaliland is the highest court of the judiciary and consists of a chief judge and at least four other associate judges. The supreme court acts in three different capacities. First it is the final appellate court and as such it can hear cases remanded to it by lower courts concerning all issues of criminal or civil law. In this capacity it also addresses concerns over the validity of national elections. Second, it acts as the constitutional court, addressing issues of constitutional interpretation and application. Finally, in impeachment cases brought against ministers of the government it functions as the High Court of Justice, overseeing the trial and calling for the removal of ministers if found guilty. The High Court of Justice consists of five members of the Supreme Court and four additional members selected two each from the two houses of Parliament.The impeachment process for the President or Vice-President, while overseen by the Chief Justice, is administered by parliament rather than the Supreme Court itself.

List of chief justices
In office	Name	Appointed by	Notes
1993 - 1996	Muse Haji Diiriye (Idaar)	Egal	
1997 - 1998	Hashi sheikh Muse Abdi	Egal	Removed Egal
1999 - 2000	Osman Hussain khaire (shunu)	Egal	
2000 - 2001	Mahamed Haji Said	Egal	
January 2001 - December 2001	Osman Hussain khaire (shunu)	Egal	one year temporary
June 2002 - June 2003	Said Ahmed Farah	Dahir Riyale kahin	
June 2003 - June 2006	Faysal Haji Jama Geddi	Dahir Riyale kahin	
June 2006 - June 2011	Mohamed Ismail Hirsi (Oomane)	Dahir Riyale kahin	
July 2011 – April 2015	Yusuf Ismail Ali	Silanyo	
June 2015 – Incumbent	Adan Haji Ali Ahmed	President Silanyo	
	Sources:		

=== Lower Civilian Courts ===
The Regional, Regional Appeals, and District Courts are all administered by the Judicial Commission and deal with all manners of civil and criminal law.

=== Courts of the National Armed Forces ===
The Courts of the National Armed Forces hear criminal cases brought against armed forces members during peace or war.

== Judicial Commission ==
The constitution also mandated the formation of a judicial commission (sometimes called the High Judicial Council), an organization tasked with overseeing the lower civilian courts of Somaliland. This body is in charge of promoting or dismissing judges of the lower courts as well as deputy attorneys general.

Somaliland Judicial Commission
Title	Rank	Notes
Chief Judge of the Supreme Court	Chairman	
	Members	
Attorney General	Member	
Director of the Ministry of Justice	Member	
	Member	
Intellectual (once every 2 years)	Member	Nominated by the House of Representatives
Businessperson (once every 2 years)	Member	Nominated by the House of Representatives
Person knowledgeable of tradition (once every 2 years)	Member	Nominated by the House of Elders
Religious Scholar (once every 2 years)	Member	Nominated by the House of Elders

== Attorney-General ==
The Attorney-General of Somaliland is appointed by the President and approved by the House of Representatives. In addition to broadly administering and facilitating justice throughout Somaliland, the Attorney General is responsible for submitting charges against members of the judiciary for removal, prosecuting national legislators accused of crimes, and bringing forth charges against cabinet ministers of the government.

== Criticism and Attempts at Reform ==
Much criticism has been aimed at the Somaliland judiciary, mainly for its inefficiency and unequal application of the law. In addition, the judiciary is viewed as being too heavily dominated by outside forces, including the Executive and Legislative Branches. One example of this is the President's authority to dismiss Supreme Court judges for virtually no reason, an authority that President Mohamoud used in 2011 when he dismissed eight sitting Supreme Court justices. According to a 2016 study on the state of the Somaliland judiciary, among the primary reasons for the judiciary's inefficiency and lack of independence were a lack of funding, multiple and conflicting laws concerning the judiciary, and an unclear role of the judiciary as defined in the constitution. The Law on the Organization of the Judiciary, which is the most recent substantial attempt at judicial reform, was passed in two different forms in both 2003 and 2008 and since both were technically ratified by both houses of Parliament and approved by the President, they both still govern the judicial system today. These laws contain several contradictory or unclear sections, and though a third law aiming to consolidate the two previous ones is currently being written, it has yet to be put into law.

There have, however, been many attempts at reform, especially since the 2015 appointment of reform-minded Chief Justice Adan Haji Ali Ahmed. From 2012–2016 the Ministry of Justice in Somaliland implemented a four-year training program to train law school graduates for entrance into the judiciary. In addition, there have been numerous NGOs that have produced reports on reform and proposed ideas for how to improve the judiciary.
