= 2019 in Somaliland =

- Decades: 1990s; 2000s; 2010s; 2020s
- See also: History of Somaliland; List of years in Somaliland

Events of 2019 in Somaliland.

== Incumbents ==
- President: Muse Bihi Abdi
- Vice President: Abdirahman Saylici
- Speaker of the Parliament: Bashe Mohamed Farah
- Chairman of the House: Suleiman Mohamoud Adan
- Chief Justice: Adan Haji Ali
- Chief of Staff of Armed Forces: Nuh Ismail Tani
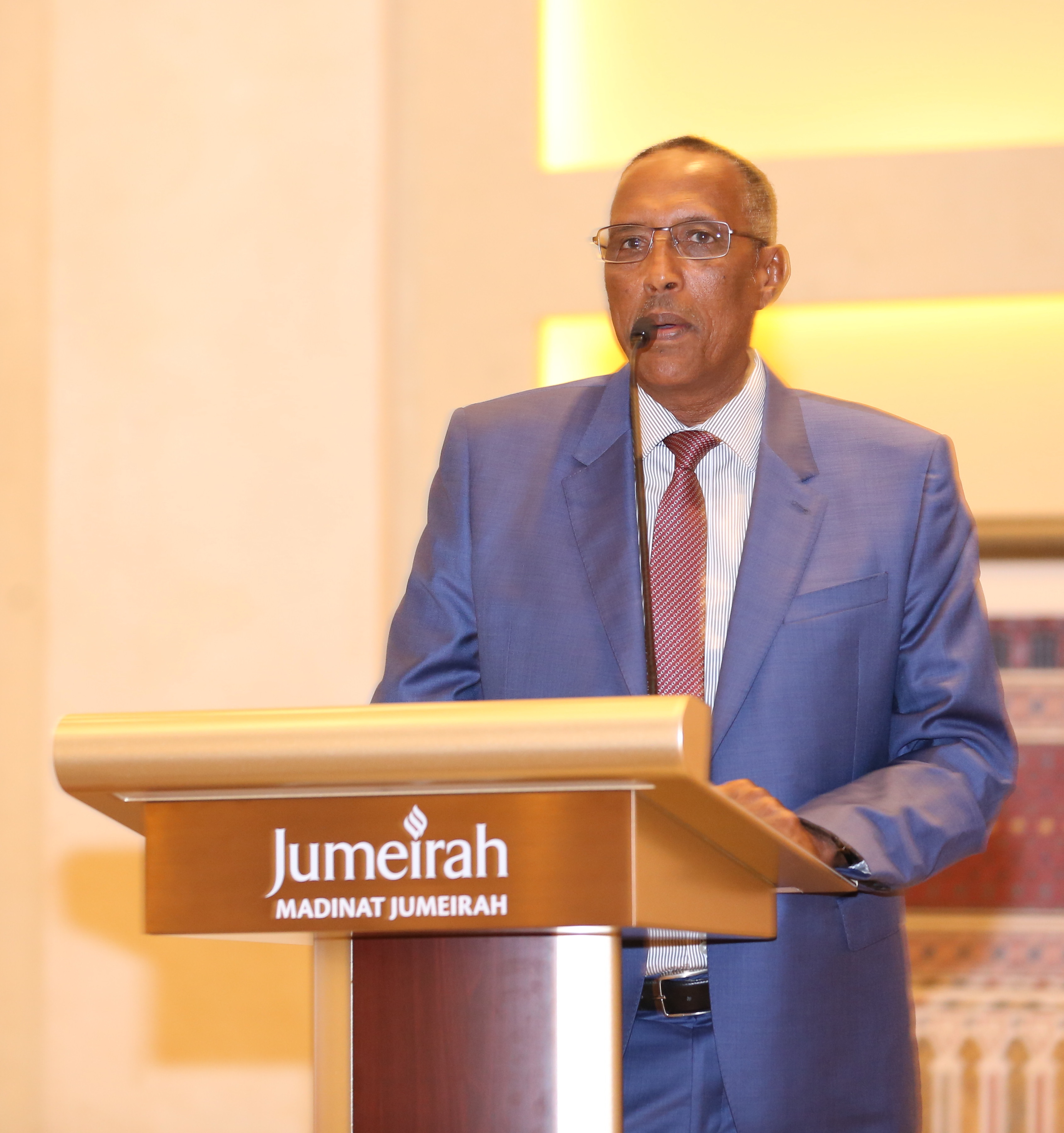
Muse Bihi Abdi

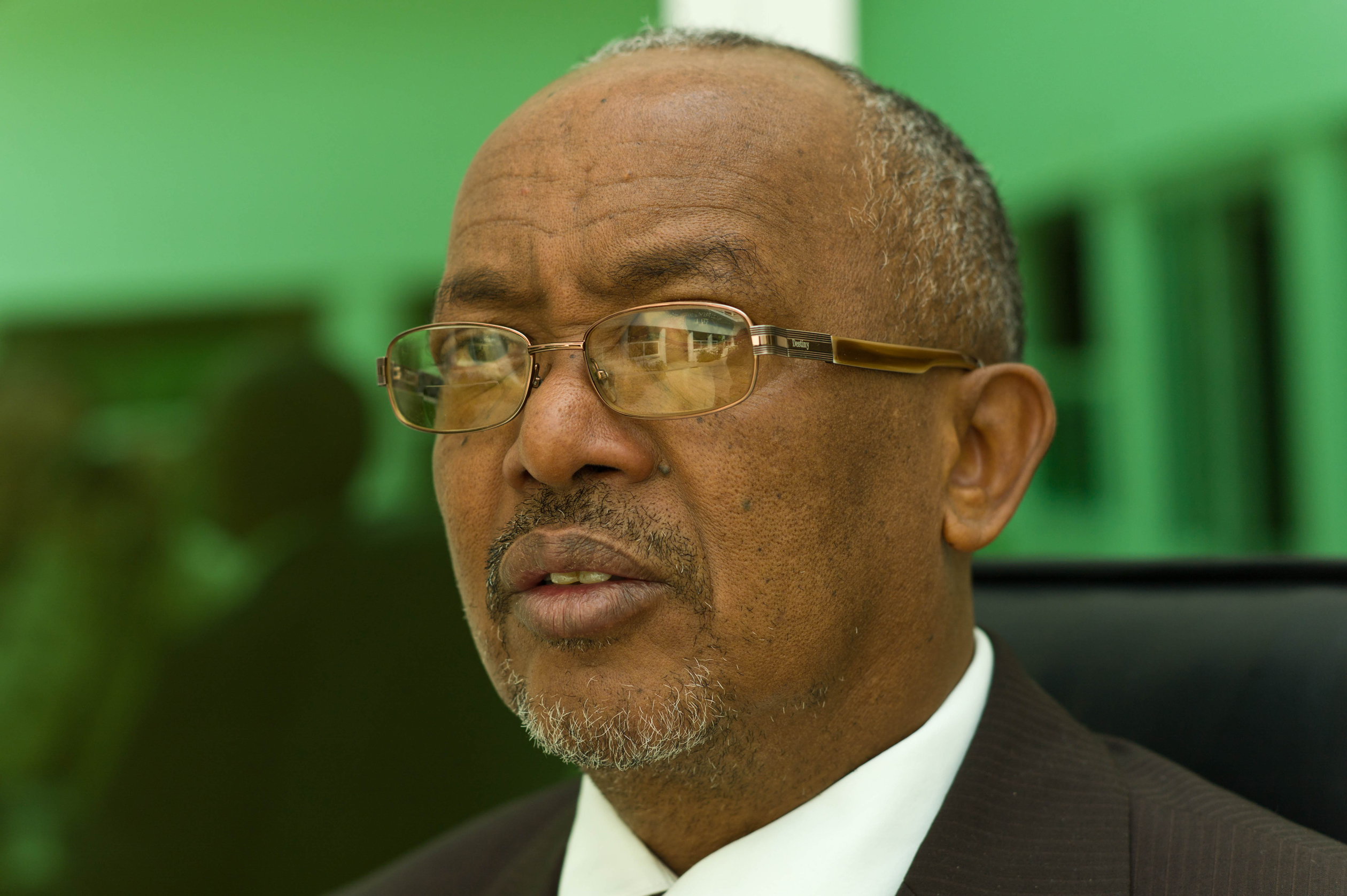
Abdirahman Saylici

== Events ==
=== January ===
- January 24
  - The 28th Session of the Cabinet of Somaliland, chaired by the President was held at the presidential palace in Hargeisa.

=== February ===
- February 789
  - The 6th General Assembly of ruling party Kulmiye, which was held in Borama, was elected the chairman and vice chairman of the party.

=== March ===
- March 18
  - A delegation led by Eritrean foreign minister, Osman Saleh Mohammed arrived in Hargeisa.

=== April ===
- April 29
  - A session of the House of Representatives, chaired by Speaker of the house, Bashe Mohamed, was approved by the Judicial System Law.

=== May ===
- May 28
  - Civil Service Commission, the Central Bank and the Auditor General signed a tripartite agreement about civil servant management.

=== June ===
- June 7
  - A huge fire engulfs a stores in Gobannimo Market of hargeisa.

=== July ===
- July 11
  - Ministry of Posts and Technology has announced that it has implemented the postal services for the first time in the country.

=== August ===
- August 21
  - the National Tender Board has announced the successful bid for the maintenance of two bridges in Burao.

=== September ===
- September 18
  - Berbera municipality hands five military vehicles to the Minister of Interior.

=== October ===
- October 12
  - At least 11 people have been killed and 13 injured in a car accident on the eastside outskirts of Berbera.

=== November ===
- November 18
  - Council of Ministers approved the 2020 forecast of the National Budget.

=== December ===
- December 26
  - President of Somaliland opened the Local Industrial Exhibition in hargeisa.

== Deaths ==
=== May ===
- May 10
  - Haji Abdi Warabe - member of House of Elders.

=== November ===
- November 5
  - Abdillahi Fadal Iman - Somaliland Police Commissioner (born 1960)
