= 2015 in Somaliland =

- Decades: 1990s; 2000s; 2010s; 2020s
- See also: History of Somaliland; List of years in Somaliland

Events of 2015 in Somaliland.

== Incumbents ==
- President: Ahmed Mohamed Mohamoud
- Vice President: Abdirahman Saylici
- Speaker of the House: Abdirahman Mohamed Abdullahi
- Chairman of the House: Suleiman Mohamoud Adan
- Chief Justice:
  - Yusuf Ismail Ali (until April 19)
  - Adan Haji Ali (since April 19)
- Chief of Staff of Armed Forces: Ismail Shaqalle
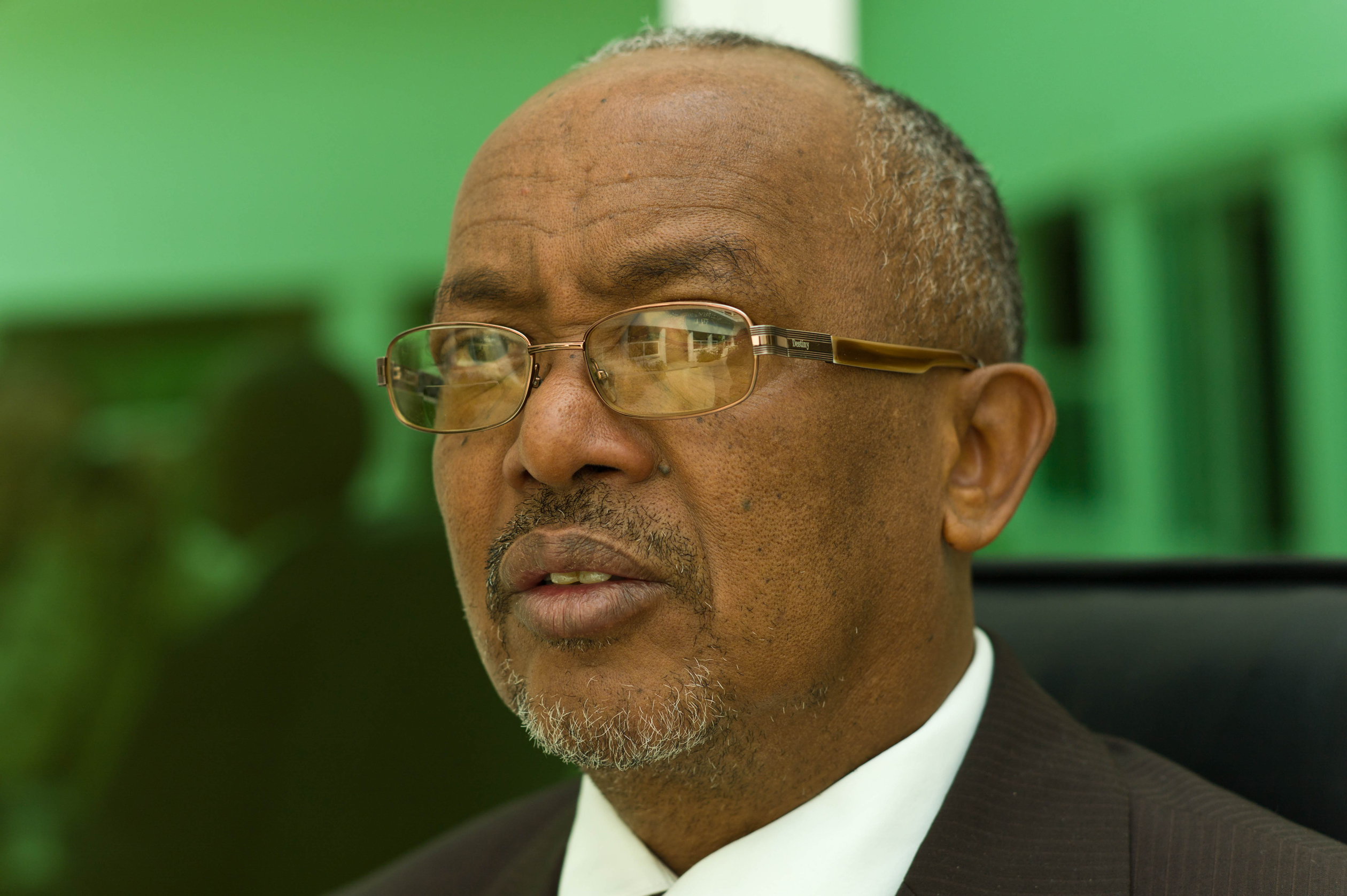
Abdirahman Saylici

== Events ==
=== January ===
- January 21

=== February ===
- February 23
  - Somaliland closes the border with Djibouti

=== March ===
- March 5

=== April ===
- April 13
  - President Ahmed Mohamed Mohamoud announces that vote registrations will occur soon

=== May ===
- May 28

=== June ===
- June 11
  - Somaliland Immigration Army repatriated five people travelling from Somalia at Egal Airport, as a result of lack of legal travel documents.

=== July ===
- July 4
  - Three people were killed and one was injured in a car accident in Galooley village on the road between Burao and Sheikh towns, The car was reportedly left in Hargeisa on its way to burao.

=== August ===
- August 5
  - Nine people have died of thirst and famine in the Selel region, These people were residents and travelers who reportedly died at the Bank of Giriyat (banka giriyaad). Also, large numbers of livestock have died there.
  - Two people have been killed and ten others injured in a car accident at Qoyta town in the northwestern outskirts of Burao.

=== September ===
- September 3

=== October ===
- October 5

=== November ===
- November 4
- November 12
  - Five people were injured in clashes between police and a group of rioters in Erigavo, the clashes erupted after the police tried to apprehend a police officer who was alleged in connection with illegal weapon and a group defending him.

=== December ===
- December 30
  - Wajaale district administration, the Somaliland Immigration Chief and the Police Chief for Wajaale have jointly addressed the arrest of 200 migrants and their smugglers, which was captured at the border town of Wajaale, making the largest number of migrants attempting to cross the border between Somaliland and Ethiopia.
  - A man committed suicide after hanged himself from a tree in Masallaha village on the southern outskirts of Hargeisa.

== Deaths ==
- March 21
  - Abdikeyd Abdillahi Yusuf – businessman
- March 23
  - Hussein Mohamoud Awale – businessman
- March 26
  - Elmi Roble Furre – sultan
- June 13
  - Heis Barre Yusuf – sultan
