= 2017 in Somaliland =

- Decades: 1990s; 2000s; 2010s; 2020s
- See also: History of Somaliland; List of years in Somaliland

Events of 2017 in Somaliland.

== Incumbents ==
- President:
  - Ahmed Mohamed Mohamoud (until December 13),
  - Muse Bihi Abdi (since December 13)
- Vice President: Abdirahman Saylici
- Speaker of the House:
  - Abdirahman Mohamed Abdullahi (until August 6)
  - Bashe Mohamed Farah (since August 6)
- Chairman of the House: Suleiman Mohamoud Adan
- Chief Justice: Adan Haji Ali
- Chief of Staff of Armed Forces: Nuh Ismail Tani
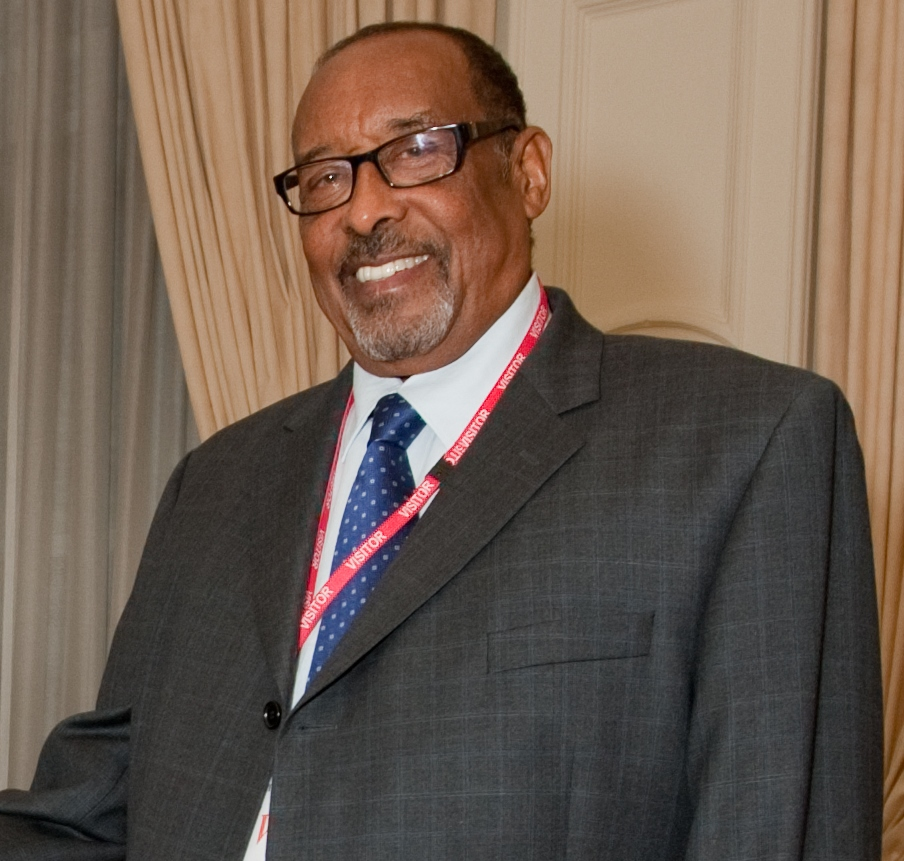
Ahmed Mohamed Mohamoud

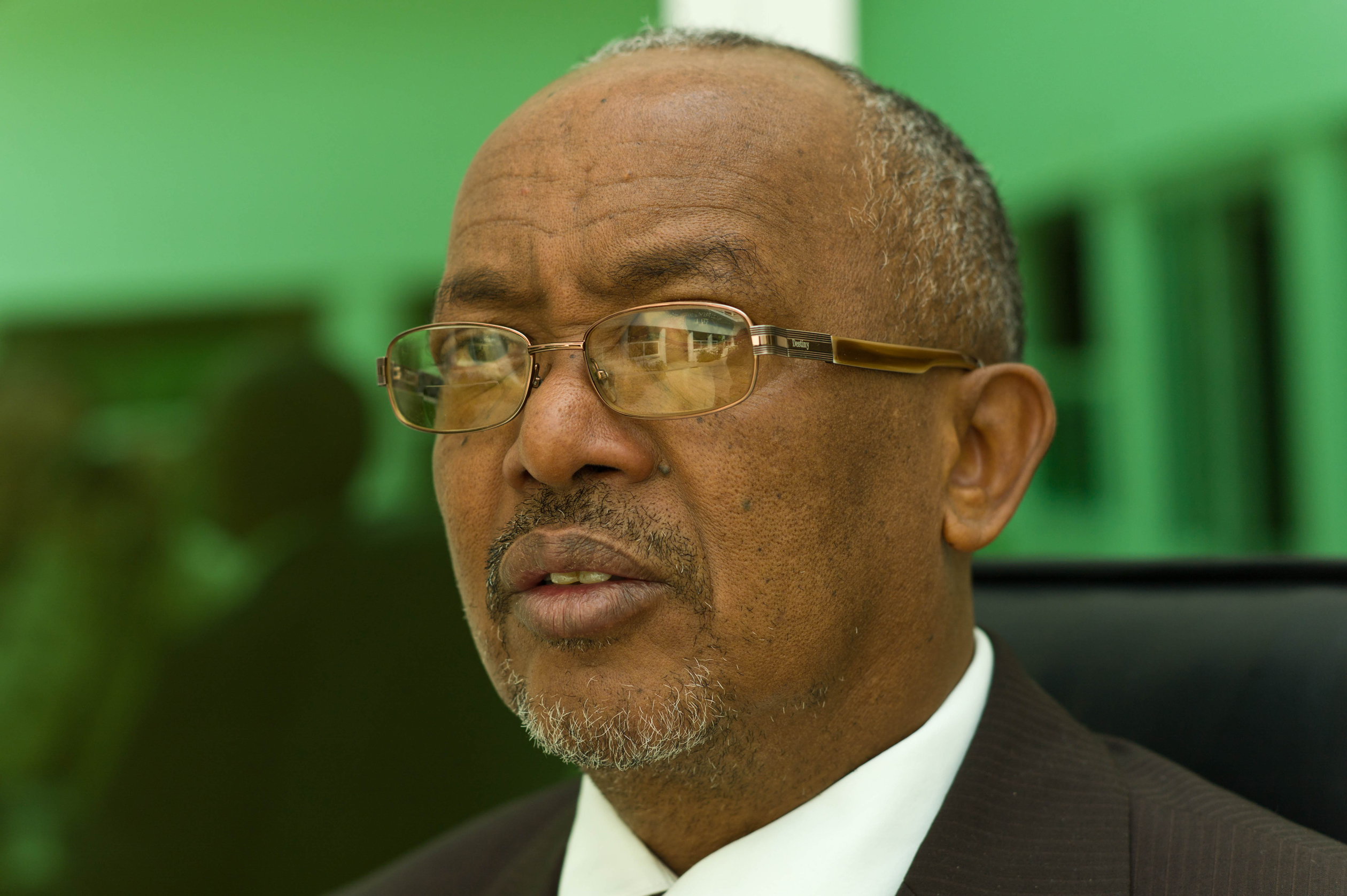
Abdirahman Saylici

== Events ==
=== January ===
- January 5
- January 23
  - Two children between the ages of 7 and 13 died of hunger and thirst in the Tiincarro area south of Badhan District, an area severely affected by the 2017 drought.

=== February ===
- February 2
  - The Borama Police arrested four people for a car crash in Borama, killing two children.
- February 13

=== March ===
- March 3
  - The Somaliland government has deported two foreigners, a man and woman for insulting the religion (Islam), These two were members of DDG and DRC which are based in Denmark.
- March 9

=== April ===
- April 18
  - Minister of Fisheries and Marine Resources said a fishing boat sank off the sea between Berbera and Ceeldaraad carrying six fishermen, He cited two of them found alive, and the boat and the other four men is missing.

=== May ===
- May 11
  - Nearly 17 people died of a cholera outbreak in Xaysimo region due to malnutrition caused by the effects of the 2017 drought.

=== June ===
- June 5
  - Several people were injured in a shootout at Adhicadeeye district of Sool region as a result of clashes between two communities residing in the district.

=== July ===
- July 1
  - The certification exams have begun in the country, in which fourth-graders of the secondary and eighth-graders of Intermediate Schools are seated, with a total of nearly 20,000 students nationwide.

=== August ===
- August 3
  - The members of the House of Representatives approved the resignation of Speaker of the House (Abdirahman Irro), in an extraordinary session which was attended by 71 of the 82 members of the house.

=== September ===
- September 23
  - Group of alcohol smugglers killed a policeman in Sool region, while a young boy died in a riot between supporters of Waddani and Kulmiye parties in Dilla district.
- September 28

=== October ===
- October 11
  - The National Electoral Commission announced that the presidential election scheduled to be held in November 13, the registered (704,089) voters would be cast in (1642) polling centers in (21) constituencies(degmo doorasho).
- October 30

=== November ===
- November 6
- November 22
  - The newly elected president, Muse Bihi Abdi in his first public address focused on the togetherness, national unity and his plans, which the people of Somaliland welcomed.

=== December ===
- December 14
  - The new President of Somaliland named his cabinet members, containing twenty-three ministers and nine deputy ministers.

== Deaths ==
=== April ===
- April 19
  - Hassan Gawdhan Yusuf – poet and songwriter.
