= Egal =

Egal or Égal may refer to:

== People ==
- Ali Sugule Egal (1936–2016), Somali composer, poet and playwright
- Fabienne Égal (born 1954), French announcer and television host
- Liban Abdi Egal, Somali entrepreneur
- Muhammad Haji Ibrahim Egal (1928–2002), Somali politician
- Yasin Ali Egal (born 1991), Somali international footballer
- Egal Shidad, Somali folk hero that was known as the brave coward

== Other uses ==
- "Égal" (song), 1981 song by Amanda Lear
- Equal (sweetener), known in French Canada as Égal
- Egalitarianism (French: égal), school of thought that prioritizes equality for all people
- Egal, alternative spelling of agal, a clothing accessory worn by Arab men.
