= Jama Musse Jama =

Somali ethnomathematician and author (born 1967

Jama Musse Jama جامع موسى جامع
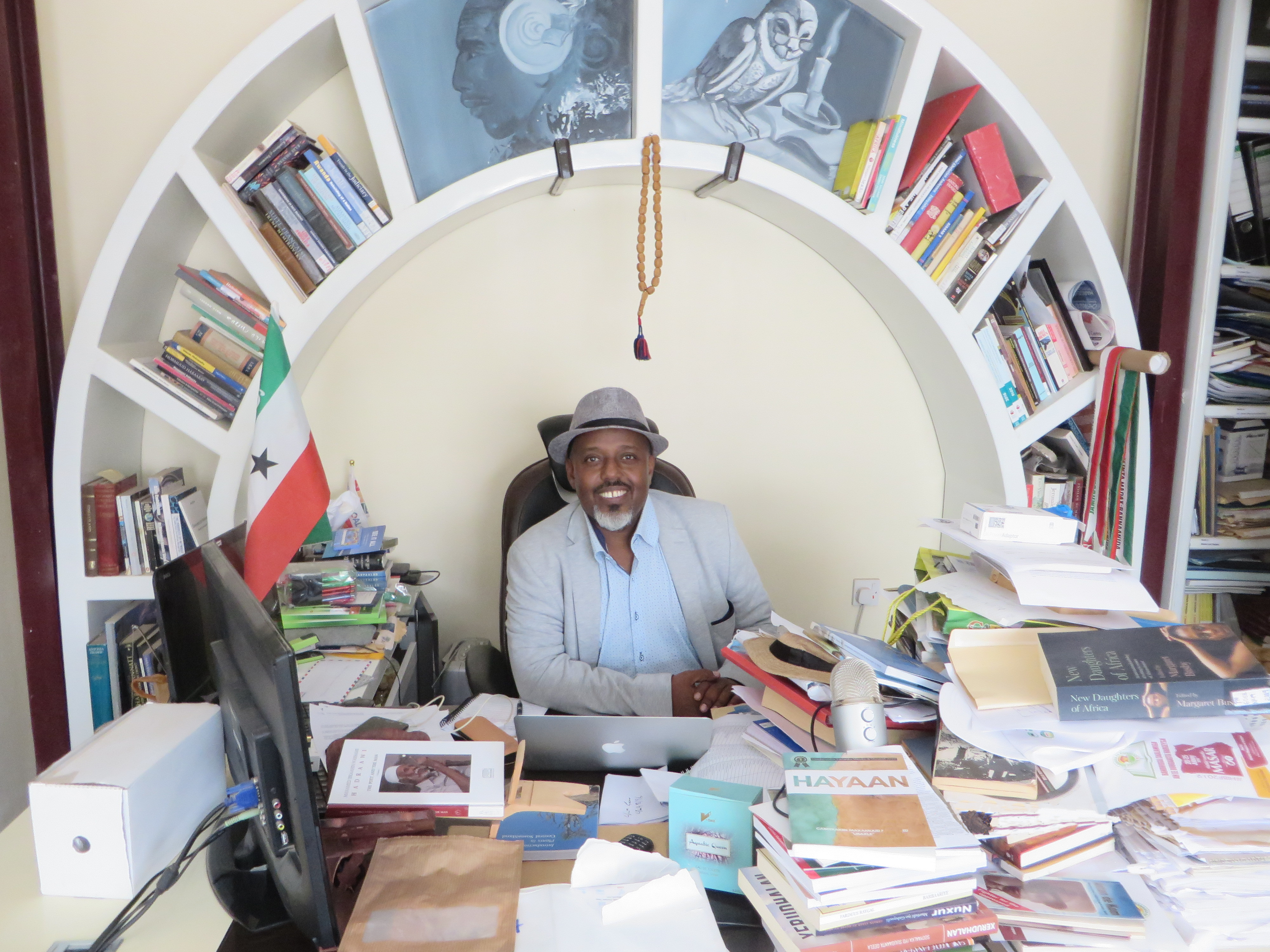
- Born: 1967 (age 58–59); Hargeisa, Somaliland
- Education: Università degli Studi di Napoli "L'Orientale", University of Pisa, Somali National University
- Occupations: Ethnomathematician, author
- Known for: Gobannimo Bilaash Maaha / Freedom is not free (2007); A Note on my Teacher's Group – News Report of an Injustice (2002)

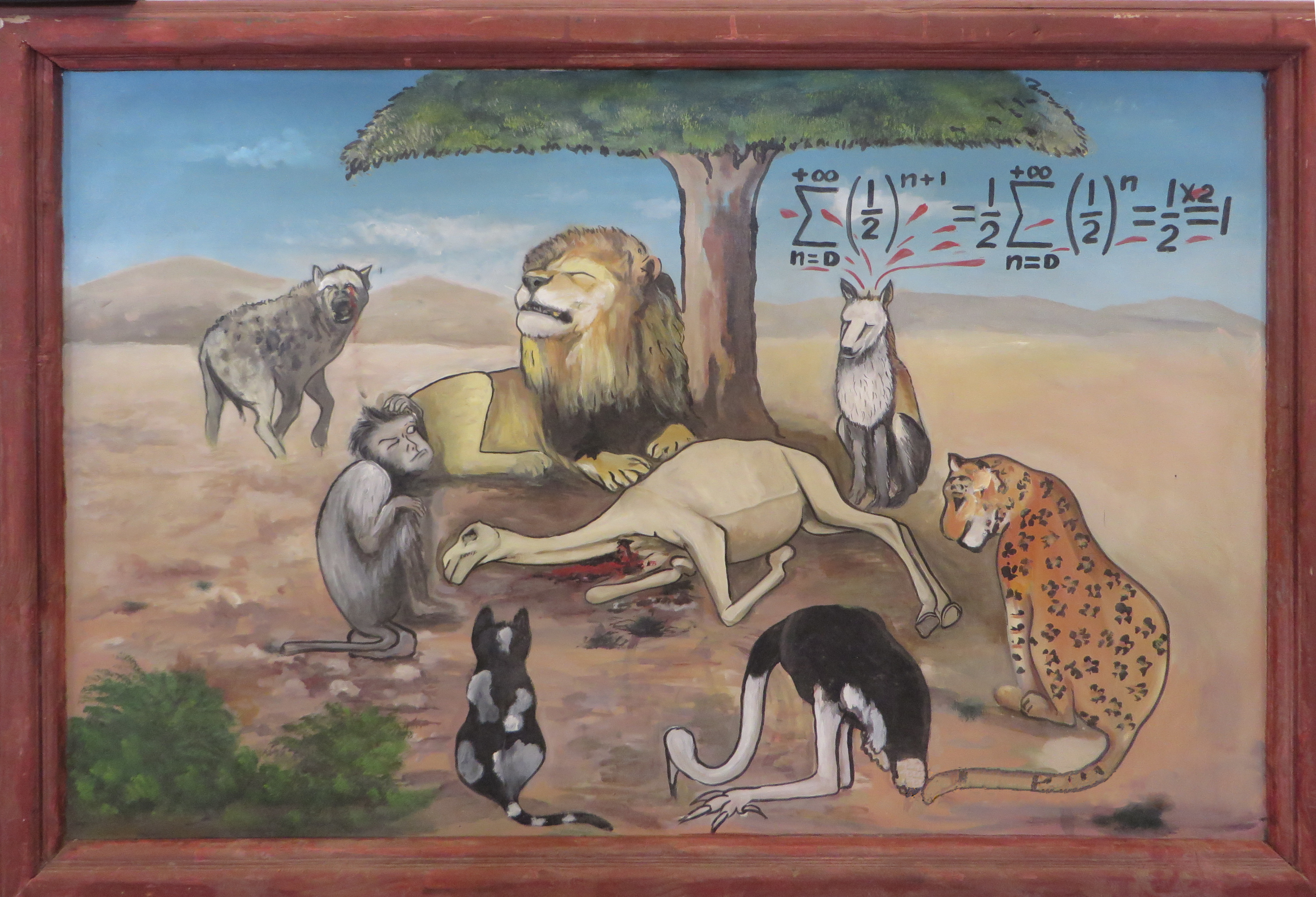
A mural by Jama depicting an animal story, with a lion, a bleeding dromedary and other animals, as etnomathematical illustration of the mathematical geometric series of 0.5 = 1.0. Xarunta Dhaqanka ee Hargeysa (Hargeysa Cultural Centre), Somaliland, 2019.

Jama Musse Jama (Somali: Jaamac Muuse Jaamac, Arabic: جامع موسى جامع) (born 1967) is a prominent Somali ethnomathematician and author. He is notable for his research on traditional Somali boardgames such as Shax.

== Biography ==
Jama was born in 1967 in Hargeisa, Somaliland, where he had his primary and secondary education. He then left for Mogadishu and attended the Somali National University, where he studied mathematics for four and half years. Fluent in Italian, Jama left Hargeisa to study as a mathematician at the University of Pisa in Italy, and he went on to obtain a PhD in Computational linguistics at Università degli Studi di Napoli "L'Orientale". He has a particular interest in civil liberties and he is the author (or co-author) of six books, two of them on Somali traditional games.

At the University of Pisa, Jama began researching traditional Somali games as well as the history of mathematics in the Horn of Africa, a topic he has written about in several journals. His interests include Education in Somaliland, and as an activist, Jama is deeply involved in the affairs of the Somali diaspora during festivals and conferences that he chairs or at which he is a key contributor. A specific interest of Jama's is to promote Somali language, literature, and literacy. He is the founder and the organiser of Hargeysa International Book Fair. He created the Somali Corpus of digital texts for linguistic analysis. In 2014 he founded the Hargeysa Cultural Centre and become its director. In 2019, Jama joined as Research Associate the Centre of African Studies at SOAS, University of London and in 2020 as a senior research associate The Bartlett Development Planning Unit, University College London, United Kingdom.

== Work ==
=== Articles (selected) ===
- "Where Politics Fails, Cultural Diplomacy is an Alternative Option" (2020)
- "Can a Computer compose a Somali poem after 40 years of Somali Language written experience?" (2013)
- "Transitioning from Oral to a Written Culture: The Impact of Hargeysa International Book Fair",
- "Tidcan: Multiple Alliteration of Somali Songs – New Insights", International Journal of Literature and Arts, Volume 9, Issue 3, May 2021, pages 124–142
- "The role of mathematics in ethnomathematics Education: Cases from the Horn of Africa"
- "Creating a Mathematical Terminology: The Somalia Case", with F. Favilli
- "Linguistic and Cultural Aspects in Teaching Mathematics", with F. Favilli
- "Mathematics under an African acacia tree", with F. Favilli

=== Books ===
- Cittadinanza è partecipazione, Bianca&Volta Edizioni, Trieste, 2013, ISBN 978-88-96400-50-0 (ePub ISBN 978-88-96400-51-7)
- SUPER KEEY: La leucemia non è un gioco, Edizione ETS, Pisa, 2010, ISBN 978-88-46727-74-9 (CDROM game ISBN 978-88-46727-77-0)
- Gobannimo Bilaash Maaha / Freedom is not free, 2007, ISBN 88-88934-06-5.
- A NOTE ON MY TEACHER'S GROUP – News Report of an Injustice, 2003, ISBN 88-88934-01-4.
- Shax: the preferred game of our camel-herders and other traditional African entertainments, 2002, ISBN 88-87332-05-3.
- Layli Goobalay: Variante Somala del Gioco Nazionale Africano, 2002, ISBN 88-88934-00-6.

=== Awards ===
- Cultura della Solidarietà, Pistoia, 29 June 2014. The organising committee commended him for his 'exemplary work promoting cultural knowledge and inquiry in Somaliland.'
