= 2001 Somaliland constitutional referendum =

- 31 May 2001

Results
Choice	Votes	%
Yes	1,148,940	97.10%
No	34,302	2.90%
Valid votes	1,183,242	99.61%
Invalid or blank votes	4,591	0.39%
Total votes	1,187,833	100.00%
Registered voters/turnout	1,188,746	99.92%

A constitutional referendum was held in Somaliland on 31 May 2001. The referendum was held on a draft constitution that affirmed Somaliland's independence from Somalia. 99.9% of eligible voters took part in the referendum and 97.1% of them voted in favour of the constitution.

The ratification of the constitution confirmed Somaliland's independence, strengthened the executive branch and confirmed Islam as the "national faith". Most importantly, it endorsed multiparty elections at all levels of government through universal suffrage paving way for democratic rule.

However the referendum was opposed by the Government of Somalia and did not lead to any international recognition.

== Background ==
In May 1991 after the fall of the military dictator of Somalia, Siad Barre, the Somali National Movement declared the independence of Somaliland. In 1993 an executive presidency was set up with a bicameral legislature and Muhammad Haji Ibrahim Egal was elected president by a council of elders. In 1997, at a Conference of Somaliland Communities in Hargeisa, a constitution was adopted to last for 3 years until a referendum could take place to bring it into full effect.

The constitution was amended in 2000 and the referendum was delayed until 2001. Meanwhile, the attempts to form a national government of Somalia and the formation of the Transitional National Government of Somalia in May 2000 encouraged Somaliland to hold a referendum to try to show Somaliland's desire for independence.

== Referendum ==
The referendum in effect became a vote on the independence of Somaliland due to the inclusion in the constitution of a clause on Somaliland's independence. The Somaliland Parliament allocated in excess of $650,000 to finance the referendum, nearly 5% of the total national budget. As there had been no census or voter lists, community elders decided who was eligible to vote.

In August 2002, President Egal's government distributed thousands of copies of the proposed constitution across Somaliland.

The Transitional Federal Government of Somalia opposed the referendum, describing it as illegal and said that the government of Somaliland had no authority to unilaterally separate from Somalia. The referendum was also opposed by the leadership of the neighbouring region of Puntland. No international organisation or country supported the referendum.

A team of ten observers from the Initiative and Referendum Institute observed the referendum. They were only able to visit 57 of the 600 polling stations and avoided the Sool region entirely due to security concerns. This was due to the region being regarded as the "most volatile" region of Somaliland and having opposition to the referendum occurring.

However, in those stations recorded they reported that the referendum was open, fair, peaceful and any fraud was rare and insignificant.

== Results ==
Choice	Votes	%
For	1,148,940	97.10
Against	34,302	2.90
Total	1,183,242	100.00
Valid votes	1,183,242	99.61
Invalid/blank votes	4,591	0.39
Total votes	1,187,833	100.00
Registered voters/turnout	1,188,746	99.92
Source: African Elections Database

== Aftermath ==
President of Somaliland Muhammad Haji Ibrahim Egal described the referendum as having made Somaliland into a nation and put an end to any question of reuniting with Somalia. However, despite the support for independence demonstrated in the referendum, only Israel has since recognised the independence of Somaliland.
