= Salahlay =

Salahley Sallaxley
- City
- Salahlay
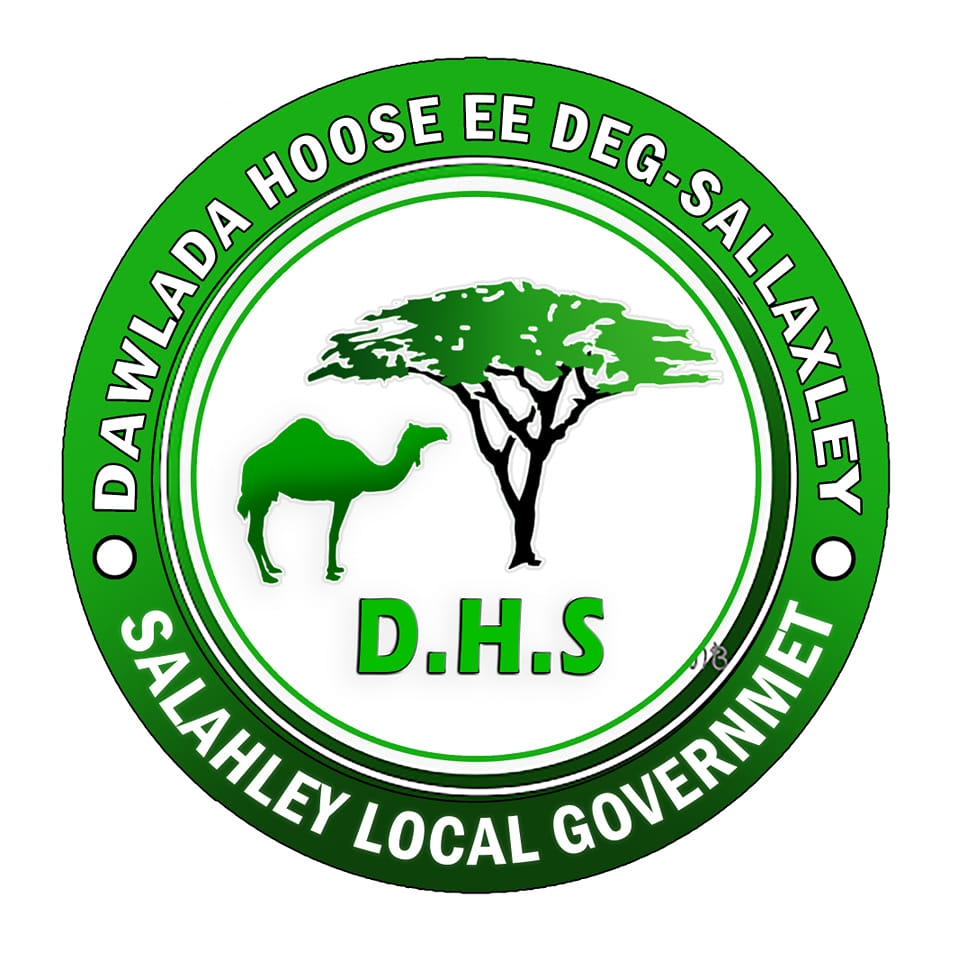
- Local council seal of Salahley

- Location in Somalia Salahley (Somalia)
- Coordinates: 9°01′36″N 44°12′26.9″E
- Country: Somaliland
- Region: Marodi Jeh
- District: Salahlay District

Government
  - Type: Council Government
- Elevation: 1,215 m (3,986 ft)
  - Density: 30/km^{2} (78/sq mi)
- Time zone: UTC+3 (EAT)
- Area code: +252

Salahley (Somali: Sallaxley; Arabic: سلحلي), is a town in the Maroodi Jeex region of Somaliland and is the seat of the Salahlay District. It is south of Hargeisa, the capital of the country.

== Location ==
The City located around 56 km southeast of Hargeisa and 15 km from the border with the Somali Region of Ethiopia.

== Climate ==
The climate in Salahley is called a desert climate. There is virtually no rainfall during the year. The climate here is classified as BWh by the Köppen-Geiger system. In Salaxley, the average annual temperature is 22.7 °C. About 367 mm of precipitation falls annually. The driest month is December. There is 1 mm of precipitation in December. In April, the precipitation reaches its peak, with an average of 72 mm. With an average of 24.7 °C, May is the warmest month. At 19.5 °C on average, January is the coldest month of the year. The precipitation varies 71 mm between the driest month and the wettest month. The variation in annual temperature is around 5.2 °C

Climate data for Salaxley
Month	Jan	Feb	Mar	Apr	May	Jun	Jul	Aug	Sep	Oct	Nov	Dec	Year
Mean daily maximum °C (°F)	27.4 (81.3)	29 (84)	30.8 (87.4)	30.1 (86.2)	31.4 (88.5)	31.2 (88.2)	29.2 (84.6)	29.9 (85.8)	31.6 (88.9)	30.1 (86.2)	28.3 (82.9)	27.1 (80.8)	29.7 (85.4)
Mean daily minimum °C (°F)	11.6 (52.9)	13.3 (55.9)	15.6 (60.1)	16.9 (62.4)	18 (64)	18 (64)	17.7 (63.9)	17.8 (64.0)	17.9 (64.2)	15.5 (59.9)	13.6 (56.5)	12.6 (54.7)	15.7 (60.2)
Average precipitation mm (inches)	3 (0.1)	4 (0.2)	26 (1.0)	72 (2.8)	65 (2.6)	29 (1.1)	29 (1.1)	41 (1.6)	54 (2.1)	34 (1.3)	9 (0.4)	1 (0.0)	367 (14.3)
Source: Climate-Data.org,

== See also ==
- Administrative divisions of Somaliland
- Regions of Somaliland
- Districts of Somaliland
