= Abdisamad Omar Maal =

Abdisamad Omar Maal is a Somaliland judicial official and politician serving as attorney general of Somaliland. He previously served as director general of the Ministry of Interior.
