= Yusuf Ismail Ali =

Somali lawyer and judge

The Honourable Chief Justice of Somaliland Yusuf Ismail Ali CJS

Chief Justice of Somaliland
- In office 12 June 2011 – 19 April 2015
- Appointed by: Ahmed Mohamed Mohamoud
- Preceded by: Mohamed Hersi Ismail
- Succeeded by: Adan Haji Ali

Yusuf Ismail Ali (Somali: Yuusuf Ismaaciil Cali) is a Somali jurist and lawyer who served as the Chief Justice of Somaliland from June 2011 until April 2015.

== See also ==
- Ministry of Justice (Somaliland)
- Judiciary of Somaliland
- Supreme Court of Somaliland

Political offices
Preceded by Mohamed Hersi Ismail	Chief Justice of Somaliland; 2010-2015	Succeeded by Adan Haji Ali
