= Haji Abdi Warabe =

Traditional elder of Somaliland

- Xaaji Cabdi-Waraabe
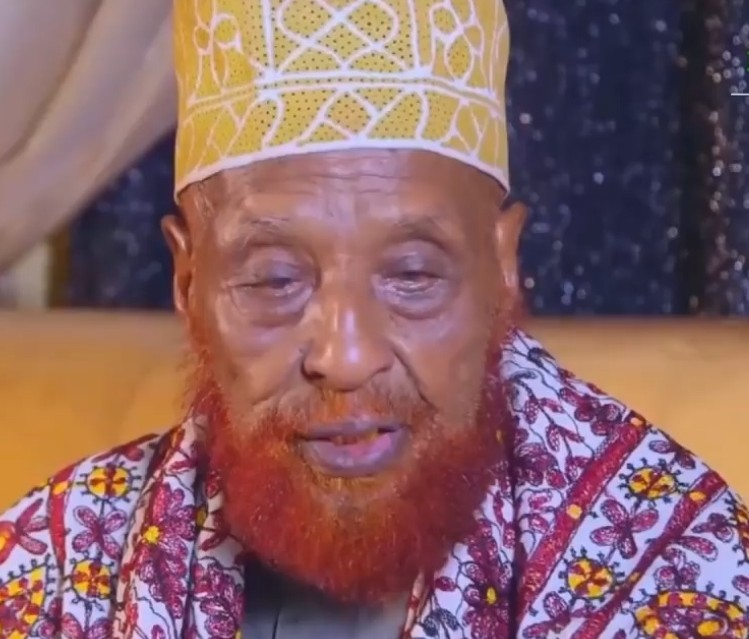

Second Vice Chairman of the Somaliland House of Elders

Chief Aqil

Personal details
- Born: 1897 Rural Hargeisa, Somaliland (then British Somaliland)
- Died: May 10, 2019 (aged 121–122) Hargeisa, Somaliland
- Party: Independent
- Children: Ahmed Haji Abdi Warabe
- Occupation: Traditional leader, peacemaker
- Known for: Peacemaking, Founding member of the House of Guurti
- Nickname: Waraabe ("Hyena")

Haji Abdikariin Hussein Yusuf (Somali: Xaaji Cabdikariin Xuseen Yuusuf; ca.1897 – 10 May 2019), commonly known as Haji Abdi Warabe (Somali: Xaaji Cabdi-Waraabe), was a prominent Somali peacemaker, traditional leader, and the oldest member of the Somaliland House of Elders (Guurti), where he also served as its vice chairman. He was widely recognized for his long history of reconciliation, peacebuilding, and bringing communities together. “Haji” is a title bestowed upon a person after they have fulfilled the obligation of the Hajj. “Warabe” is a common nickname among Somalis.

Mohamed Bullaleh (commonly known as Haji Warabe) is a different person.

== Biography ==
=== Early life ===
Abdi was born in a rural small town of Toon, located about 12 kilometers south of Hargeisa. According to another report, that area was a rural area and is where around Hargeisa Airport today. In 2012, Haji Abdi Warabe said he could not remember the year he was born, but claimed to be 115 years old. If that is correct, he was born in 1896 or 1897. But the BBC in 2019, citing a direct account from him, dates it to 1898.

He acquired his famous nickname "Waraabe" (which translates to "Hyena") during his youth. While he was a young boy herding camels, his livestock was looted. He relentlessly pursued the rustlers, refusing to give up until he successfully retrieved the camels. Amazed by his resilience, the men remarked, "This one is a hyena," a name that stayed with him for the rest of his life.

In the early 1920s, when he was in his twenties, his father was murdered by a man. In accordance with the customs of the time, he chased after the killer with the intention of killing him, the man unknowingly hosted them with such hospitality during a storm that he shielded his guests from rain using his children's mats. Refusing to kill him, Abdi Warabe asked: "Should I shoot a man who couldn't even bear to let a drop of water touch me?" This led to a peace agreement. In accordance with the customs of the time, he promised to marry the daughter of his father’s enemy as a gesture of reconciliation. (However, since the girl was still young at the time, they did not get married until 17 years later.) Abdi Warabe is said to have become an early peace pioneer when he refused to avenge his father's murder.

After his father died, his older brother succeeded him as Akil (clan chief). Warabe subsequently worked for the British colonial government. Following his brother's death, he became the clan chief in 1940. He subsequently made the pilgrimage to Mecca and fulfilled the obligation of the Hajj.

=== After Somalia's independence ===
Warabe had a long political career that spanned several administrations. Known for being decisive and outspoken, he worked closely with the successive leaders of the Somali Republic, including Presidents Aden Abdulle Osman (term 1960–1967), Abdirashid Ali Shermarke (1967–1969), and Mohamed Siad Barre (1969–1991). Since his clan was settled in the area known as Haud, between Hargeisa and Aware, he had a history of negotiating with the Ethiopian government even before the Ethiopian Revolution.

=== Somali Civil War ===
Around 1988, the Somali Civil War broke out, the city of Hargeisa, where he lived, came under attack from aircraft and artillery fire by the government, and people he knew were killed. This prompted Warabe to join the Somali National Movement (SNM) and take part in the war to liberate his homeland.

He has been involved with SNM since its days in Ethiopia and played a role in the transition of the SNM chairmanship.

=== After the establishment of Somaliland ===
When the House of Elders was established, he became one of its first members. He was elected second deputy chairman in the Senate and served in that position until his death. He played a key role in resolving the devastating clan conflict that erupted in Somaliland between 1994 and 1995.

In May 2002, during the inauguration of the Kulmiye party, Warabe addressed prominent political figures, advocating for unity over clan divisions. He praised both Ahmed Mohamed Mohamoud Silanyo and Abdirahman Aw Ali Farrah for their leadership, while firmly warning that land disputes remained Somaliland's greatest obstacle to peace and elections.

In 2004, When the speaker of the House of Elders died, an election was held to select his successor. Warabe ran for office after receiving a request from other members of the House and obtaining the president’s approval. But the president strongly backed Suleiman Mohamoud Adan, and Warabe withdrew his candidacy to avoid a confrontation. Withdrawing his chairmanship candidacy, Warabe told a parable of an impatient groom whose actions sparked a family brawl, resolved only when the wise father-in-law ordered the crowd to disperse. Warabe likened this to the Guurti election: "The Guurti missed a step by forgetting they must act collectively. Suleiman missed a step by failing to ask for my support, knowing my seniority. The President missed a step by encouraging me to run without disclosing his preferred candidate. But I miss nothing," Warabe declared, applying the parable lesson to himself.

He was interviewed by the BBC in 2012. This was part of the celebrations marking Queen Elizabeth II’s 60th anniversary on the throne, He says that at the time, he could not write. Episodes from his younger days were also aired at that time. The interview generated a great deal of attention.

In November 2017, Abdi Warabe attended a ceremony attended by President Silanyo and Vice President Saylici. During the ceremony, when Abdi Warabe asked the attendant for a drink of water, President Silanyo personally brought him a glass of water, demonstrating just how highly he was regarded. Thereafter, when Muse Bihi Abdi was elected president, Warabe drove to the presidential residence to offer his congratulations. As an aide was about to escort Warabe to the president, the president stopped him, went to the car himself, and apologized to Warabe, saying that he should have been the one to come over and greet him.

=== Death ===
Haji Abdi Warabe died on 10 May 2019 in Hargeisa. He had been hospitalized at Hargeisa International Hospital for several days prior to his death and passed away there. At the time of his death, his reported age was 121 years old. He was buried in his birthplace Toon. His death was publicly confirmed to the BBC by his son, Ahmed Haji Abdi Warabe. The Supreme Court recognized Ahmed as the successor to the House of Elders.
