= Attorney-General of Somaliland =

The Attorney General of Somaliland is the chief law officer and legal adviser to the government of Somaliland. Article 103 of the Constitution of the Republic of Somaliland empowers the Attorney General and the Deputies to serve as prosecutors (procuracy) while Article 107 appoints Attorney General as a member of the Judicial Commission, Article 113 designates the Attorney General and the Deputies (Procuracy) Special Organ of the State. The current Attorney General is Abdisamad Omar Maal.

== Appointment and duties ==
The Attorney-General is appointed by the President and approved by the House of Representatives. In addition to broadly administering and facilitating justice throughout Somaliland, the Attorney General is responsible for submitting charges against members of the judiciary for removal, prosecuting national legislators accused of crimes, and bringing charges against cabinet ministers of the government.

The attorney General of Somaliland performs the following specific duties among others:

· Providing legal advice and representation to the government

· Participating in Cabinet meetings and discussions on legal matters, national security and economy

· Drafting laws and amendment to legislations

· Commenting on important legal and constitutional matters including election procedures and quotas for women and minority groups.
