= Constitution of Somaliland =

Supreme law of Somaliland

The Constitution of the Republic of Somaliland
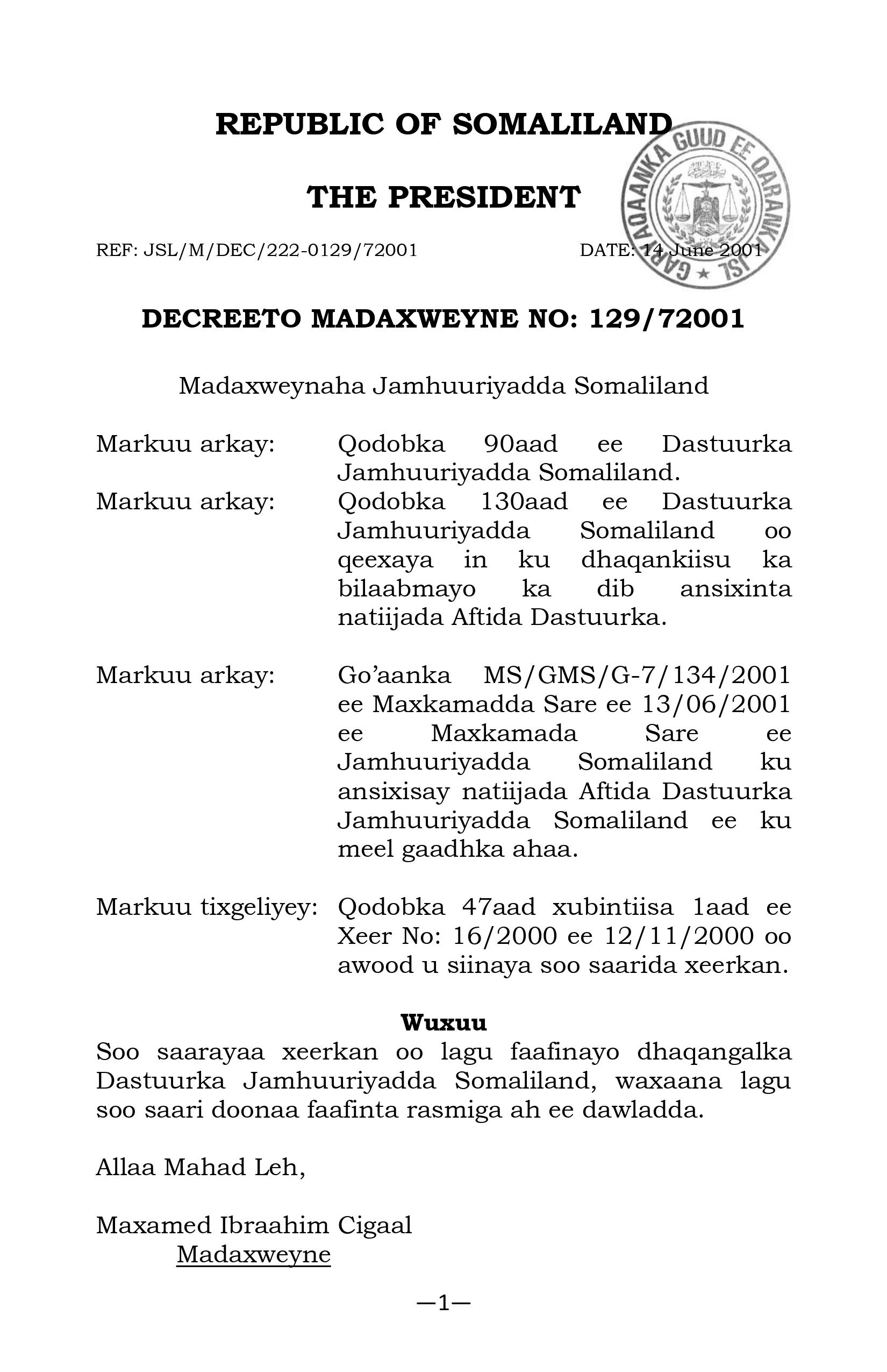
- Presidential decree ratifying the Somaliland constitution voted by the people of Somaliland

Overview
- Jurisdiction: Republic of Somaliland
- Created: 25 May 1993 to February 1997
- Presented: 30 April 2000
- Ratified: 12 December 2000
- Date effective: 13 June 2001
- System: Constitutional presidential republic

Government structure
- Branches: 3
- Chambers: Bicameral
- Executive: President
- Judiciary: Supreme
- Citation: The Constitution of Somaliland (PDF), 1 June 2016, archived from the original (PDF) on 3 November 2021
- Signatories: Muhammad Haji Ibrahim Egal

The Constitution of the Republic of Somaliland (Somali: Dastuurka Jamhuuriyadda Somaliland; Arabic: دستور جمهورية صوماليلاند) is the supreme source of national law of Somaliland, a partially recognised state, considered to be part of Somalia by most countries, adopted by the Houses of the Parliament of Somaliland on 30 April 2000. The constitution was approved in a referendum held on May 31, 2001, when 97% of the voters voted in its favour. Its re-published version consists of a preamble (Arar) and five main chapters (Qaybo) each of which is subdivided into parts (Xubno). There is now a total of 130 articles (Qodobo) as compared to the previous 156 articles.

== History ==
Somaliland has had other constitutional documents of historical importance which range from the international treaties signed by the various Somaliland communities with the British government, and the various constitutional arrangements prior to independence in 1960 to the Declaration of Re-assertion of sovereignty in 1991 (in Burao) at one of the earliest grand conferences of the Somaliland communities. Although the Republic of Somaliland was independent for a short period in June 1960, it later unified with Trust Territory of Somalia to form the Somali Republic. During that short period no comprehensive constitution was adopted. The State of Somaliland had its own Constitution which was drafted in early 1960, and was briefly in place. The first main Constitutional document of the independent Somaliland was the National Charter (Axdi Qaran), which was signed by the Conference of the Somaliland Communities in 1993 in Borama.

This was followed by the first Somaliland constitution, which was adopted at the conference of the Somaliland Communities in Hargeisa in February 1997. Under article 151, the constitution shall be implemented for a period of three years from its approval in February 1997 and shall come into force fully once a referendum has been held. There was a provision for this interim period to be increased by the two Houses of Parliament, and in early 2000, the two Houses voted that the period be increased by one year. This was primarily to give more time for the completion of the revision of the constitution (before its submission to the nation at a Referendum) and for putting in place the laws and mechanisms for changing the current "representative" democracy in Somaliland to a popular democracy based on the direct elections of the President of Somaliland and the Parliament of Somaliland.

Although initially the Somaliland government proposed fairly extensive amendments to the constitution in 1999, the final revised constitution is not very different from the last one and the reduction of the number of articles from 156 to 130 has been largely achieved by the amalgamation of some articles, rather than by extensive repeals. Unlike the earlier draft proposals, the parts of the constitution relating to directive principles and to human rights have all been retained. On the whole, the revisions tidied up the constitution and no fundamental changes have been made.
