= Toon, Somaliland =

Toon
- Village
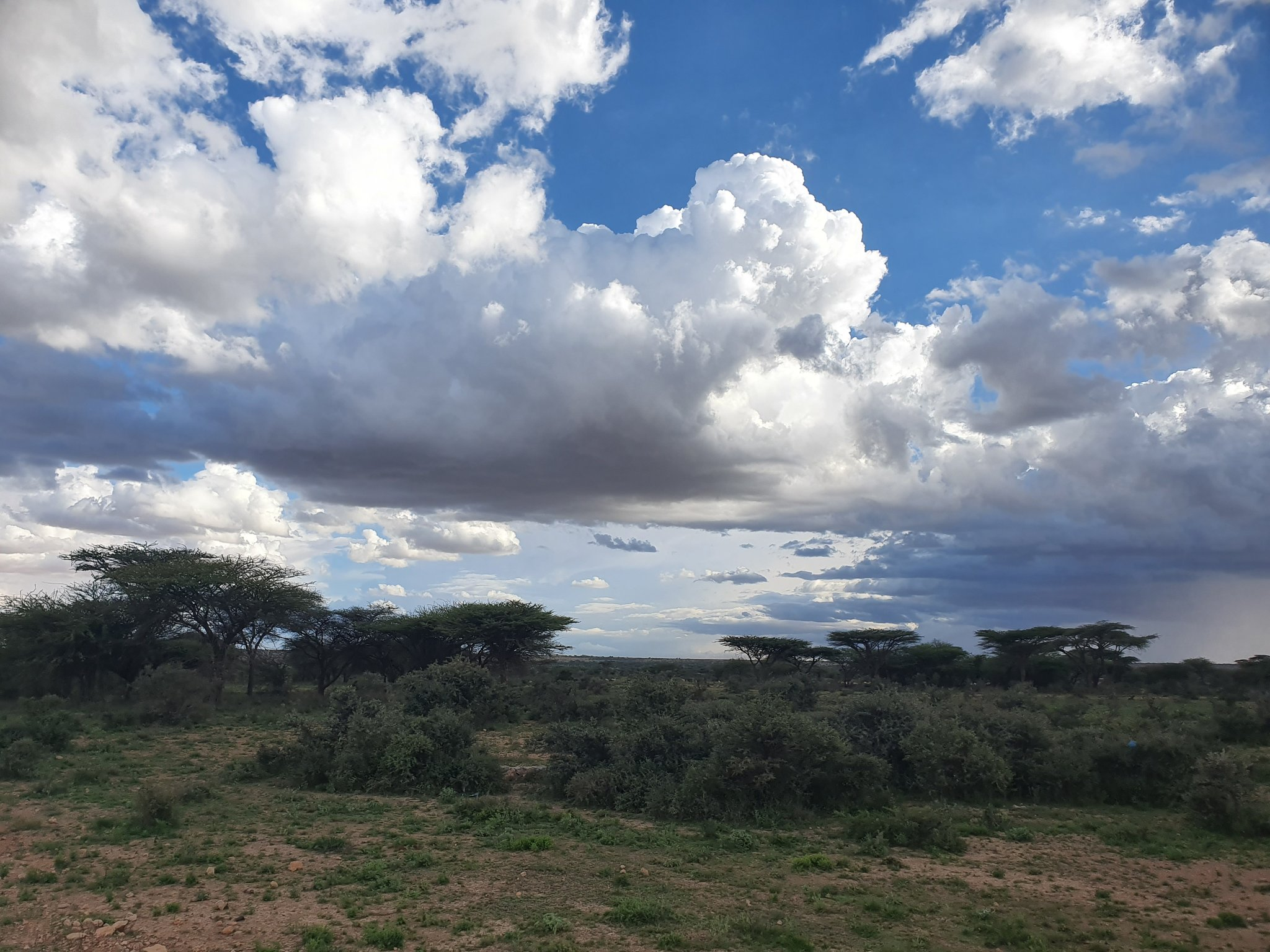
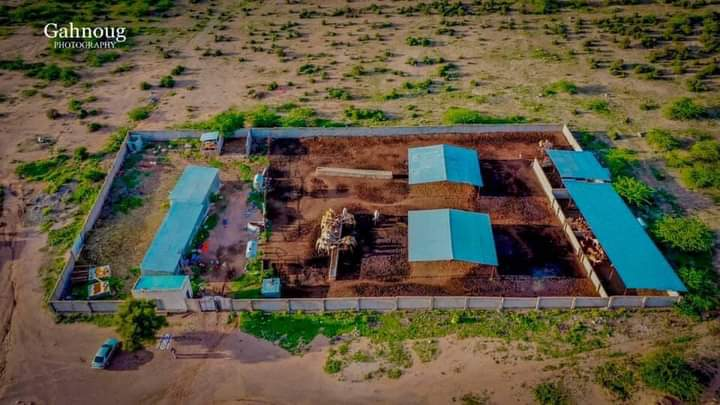
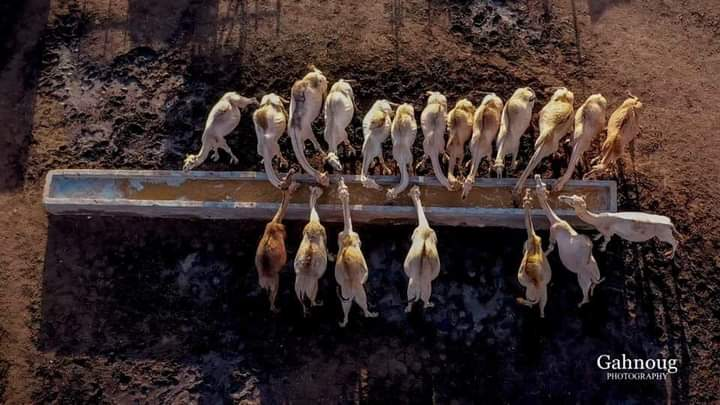
- Outskirts of Toon

- Location in Somaliland
- Coordinates: 9°23′34″N 44°7′6″E
- Country: Somaliland
- Region: Maroodi Jeex
- District: Salahlay District
- Time zone: UTC+3 (EAT)

Toon is a town in the Maroodi Jeex region of Somaliland. Situated in Salahlay District.

== History ==
The Isaaq Sultanate was established in the mid-18th century by Sultan Guled of the Eidagale sub-division of the Garhajis clan. His coronation took place after the victorious battle of Lafaruug, in which Guled Abdi successfully led the Isaaq and was crowned by the Isaaq clan after defeating the Absame tribes. After witnessing his leadership and courage, the Isaaq chiefs recognized his father Abdi who refused to adopt the Sultan title instead preferring his son Guled. Guled would be crowned the first Sultan of the Isaaq clan. Sultan Guled thus ruled the Isaaq up until his death in the early 19th century, where he was succeeded by his eldest son Farah.

The Isaaq Sultanate was established and based at Toon. Lieutenant C.P Rigby in the year 1848 writes about the capital of the Isaaq:

The Hubr Gajis tribe and its different branches are governed by two Sultans, named Sultan Deriah [Habr Yunis Sultan] and Sultan Farah: the residence of the latter is at Toro.
