= Yasin Egal =

Somalian footballer

Yasin Ali Egal
Personal information
- Date of birth: 1 March 1981 (age 45)
- Place of birth: Somalia
- Position: Defender

Senior career*
Years	Team	Apps	(Gls)
2003–2005	Elman		
2006–2014	Banadir		

International career^{‡}
2003–2011	Somalia	20	(0)
- * Club domestic league appearances and goals ‡ National team caps and goals as of 28 November 2011

Yasin Ali Egal (born 1 March 1981) is a Somali former professional footballer who played as a defender.

== Club career ==
Yasin began his career with Elman in 2003, signing for Banadir Telecom in 2006, before finishing his career with the club.

== International career ==
On 16 November 2003, Yasin made his debut for Somalia in a 5–0 loss against Ghana in a FIFA World Cup qualification game. Yasin later captained Somalia.
