= Culture of Somaliland =

Culture of Republic Somaliland encompasses a wide range of Somali activity and Islamic structures that give Somaliland a rich cultural and historical heritage. Nomadic and Arab Islamic cultural significance have also played a key role in Somaliland's cultural history.

== Cuisine ==
It is considered polite for one to leave a little bit of food on a plate after finishing a meal at another's home. This tells the host that one has been given enough food. If one were to clean his or her plate that would indicate that he or she is still hungry. Most Somalis don't take this rule so seriously, but it is certainly not impolite to leave a few bits of food on one's plate. Traditionally, the main meal of the day is eaten at lunchtime and Somali people usually begin their day with a flat bread called Laxoox or La'hooh, liver, toast, cereal or porridge made of millet or cornmeal. Lunch can be a mix of rice or noodles with meat and sauce. When the Italians ruled the Horn of Africa they brought some of their cuisine to Somaliland for example Pasta Al Forno (in Somali Paasto Forno) and they also planted bananas in the south of the region. Also during Lunch they diet may consist of a traditional soup called maraq (it is also part of Yemeni cuisine) made of vegetables, meat and beans and usually eaten with Flat bread or Pitta bread. Later in the day a lighter meal is served which includes beans, Ful medames, muffo (patties made of oats or corn), Hummus or a salad with more Laxoox/Injera. Somalilanders drink Somaliland coffee that is grown in Somaliland. Somaliland tea is also drunk in Somaliland, it's one of the famous drinks in the region—the Shah Hawaash. The majority drink a traditional and cultural tea known as Shah Hawaash, it is made of cardamom (Somali Hawaash) and cinnamon barks (Somali Qoronfil).

== Dabqaad ==
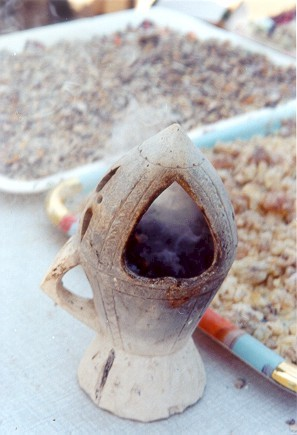
Dabqaad

It is traditional for Somalis to perfume their homes after meals. Frankincense (Somali: foox, Arabic: اللبان ) or a special man-made incense called unsi (in Arab countries it is called Bukhoor, this also may be used) is placed on top of hot coal inside the Dabqaad which will burn continuously for about ten minutes until the foox or unsi is completely consumed. This will keep the house fragrant for hours. The pot is made from a white clay that is found in Somaliland.

== Explaining the Haanta caanaha ==
Somali culture is rich in traditional tools and techniques that are uniquely adapted to the environment. One of the most important traditional items reflecting the creativity and skills of Somali people is the Haan, a traditional milk container. The haan has played a significant role in the life of pastoral communities, especially for storing and processing milk. Although modern containers like plastic and metal have largely replaced it today, the haan remains a historical and cultural heritage of Somalia that deserves recognition and preservation.

Structure and Design of the Haan The Haan is a traditional container used for holding milk, made from hardwood hollowed out to hold liquids. Women in pastoral communities were particularly skilled in crafting haans, and

Even today, many continue to practice this traditional craft. The outside of the haan is reinforced with thin wooden rods and bound with leather or plant fibers, making it durable and easy to carry. Craftspeople carefully select strong trees, such as Qabo and Argeeg, known for their durability and suitability for storing and transporting milk. The lid or cover of the Haan is made from animal hide or soft wood, tightly secured to prevent spillage during transportation. Some traditions include cleaning the inside of the haan with special plants like Culayga to ensure the milk remains fresh and has a pleasant aroma. The designs and decorations on the haan also reflect creativity, craftsmanship, and deep social knowledge passed down through generations.

== Arts ==
Islam and poetry have been described as the twin pillars of Somali culture. Most Somalis are Sunni Muslims and Islam is vitally important to the Somali sense of national identity. Most Somalis don't belong to specific mosque or sect and can pray in any mosque they find.

Celebrations come in the form of religious festivities, two of the most important being Eid al Adha and Eid al Fitr which marks the end of the fasting month. Families get dressed up to visit one another. Money is donated to the poor. Other holidays include June 26, which celebrates Somaliland's independce, however it is unrecognised by the international community.

In a nomadic culture, where one's possessions are frequently moved, there is little reason for the plastic arts to be highly developed. Somalis embellish and decorate their woven and wooden milk jugs (Somali Haano, the most decorative jugs are made in Erigavo) and their wooden headrests, and traditional dance is important; though mainly as a form of courtship among young people. The traditional dance known as the Ceeyar Somaali in the Somali language is Somaliland's favourite dance.

=== Henna art ===
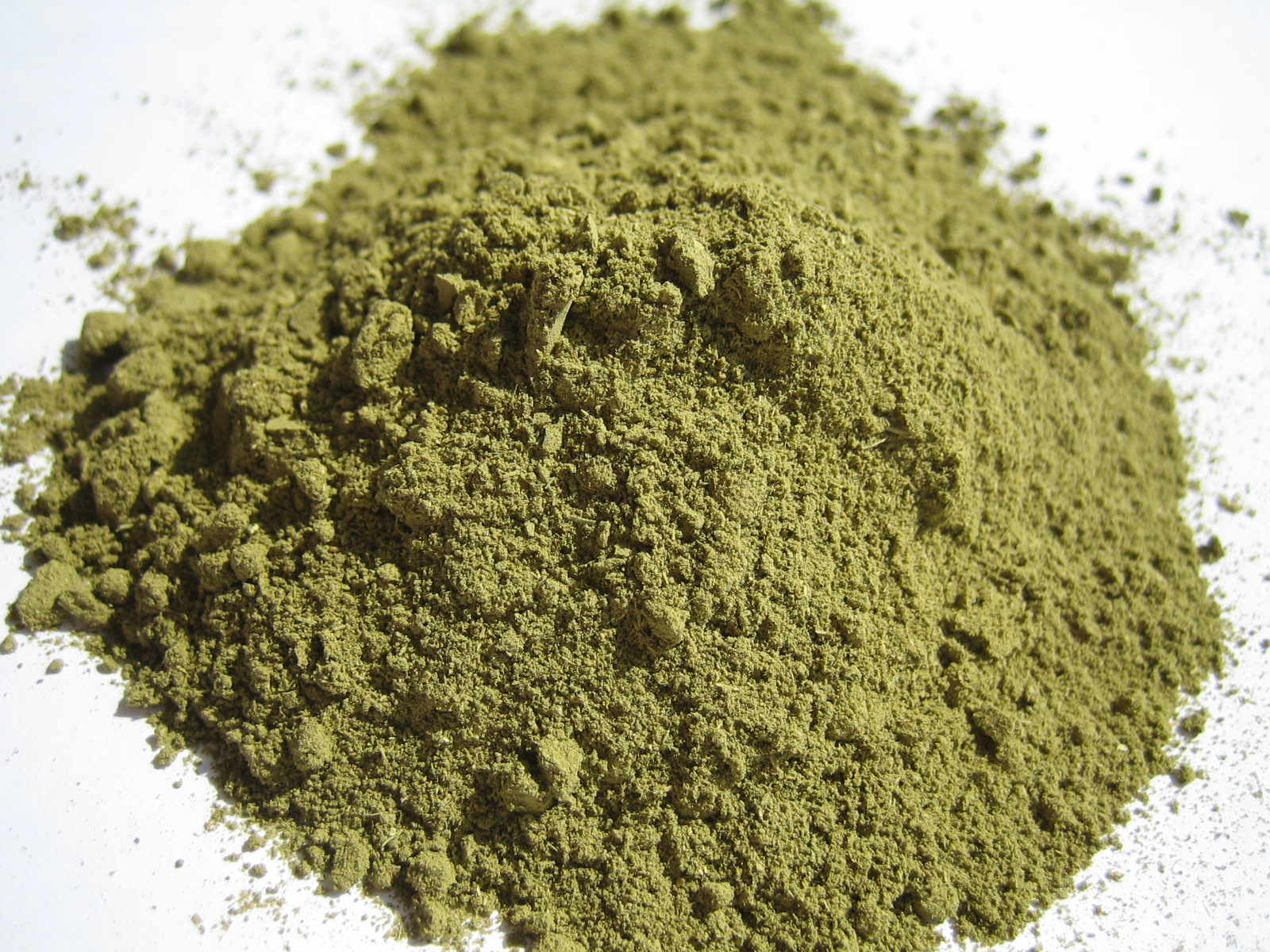
To apply it on the hair; Henna powder is mixed with water and then applied on the hair

Also, an important form of art in Somaliland is henna painting (Somali: Xenna, Arabic: حناء). The Henna plant is widely grown across the region and it was Arab merchants and settlers that first brought the art of Henna painting in early Somaliland. During special occasions, a Somali women's hands and feet are expected to be covered in decorative mendhi. Girls and women usually apply or decorate their hands and feet in henna on joyous celebrations like Eid, weddings etc. The henna designs can be very simple to highly intricate. Unlike Pakistani, Indian or Bangladeshi henna designs, the Somali and Arab designs are more modern and simple compared to the latter. Traditionally, only women apply this body art and it is absolutely strange for men to apply such art on their hands and feet.

Henna is not only applied on the hands and feet but at the same time it is used as a dye. Somali men and women alike use henna as a dye to change their hair colour. Mostly, elderly men with grey hair apply such procedure because black hair dye is forbidden in Islam. Women are free to apply henna on their hair as most of the time they are wearing a hijab.

== Languages ==
Most people in the Somaliland region speak Somaliland's three languages: the Somali language and the Arabic language, also English is spoken and taught in schools. Somali belongs to a set of languages called Lowland Eastern Cushitic spoken by peoples living in Ethiopia, Somalia, Djibouti, and Kenya. Eastern Cushitic is one section of the Cushitic language family, which in turn is part of the great Afro-Asiatic stock. Arabic is the most spoken language of the Afro-Asiatic language branches. It belongs to the Semitic languages, together with Hebrew and Amharic.

The main Somali dialect which is the most widely used is Common Somali, a term applied to several subdialects, the speakers of which can understand each other easily. Common Somali is spoken in most of Somalia and in adjacent territories (Ogaden, North Eastern Province, and Djibouti), and is used by broadcasting stations in the Somaliland.

Facility with language is highly valued in Somali society; the capability of a suitor, a warrior, or a political or religious leader is judged in part by his verbal adroitness. In such a society, oral poetry becomes an art, and one's ability to compose verse in one or more of its several forms enhances one's status. Speakers in political or religious assemblies and litigants in courts traditionally were expected to use poetry or poetic proverbs. Even everyday talk tended to have a terse, vivid, poetic style, characterized by carefully chosen words, condensed meaning, and alliteration.

In the prerevolutionary era, English became dominant in the school system and in government. However, the overarching issue was the development of a socioeconomic stratum based on mastery of a foreign language. The relatively small proportion of Somalis (less than 10 percent) with a grasp of such a language—preferably English—had access to government positions and the few managerial or technical jobs in modern private enterprises. Such persons became increasingly isolated from their nonliterate Somali-speaking brethren, but because the secondary schools and most government posts were in urban areas the socioeconomic and linguistic distinction was in large part a rural-urban one.

Even before the 1969 revolution, Somalis had become aware of social stratification and the growing distance, based on language and literacy differences, between ordinary Somalis and those in government. The 1972 decision to designate an official Somali Latin script and require its use in government demolished the language barrier and an important obstacle to rapid literacy growth.

In the years following the institution of the Somali Latin script, Somali officials were required to learn the orthography and attempts were made to inculcate mass literacy—in 1973 among urban and rural sedentary Somalis, and in 1974–75 among nomads. Although a few texts existed in the new script before 1973, in most cases new books were prepared presenting the government's perspective on Somali history and development. Somali scholars also succeeded in developing a vocabulary to deal with a range of subjects from mathematics and physics to administration and ideology.

"The official language of the Republic of Somaliland is Somali, and the second language is Arabic." (art. 6 of Constitution 2001)

== Religion ==
Almost all Somalis are Sunni Muslims; Islam is the principal faith and state religion. Though traces of pre-Islamic traditional religion exist in Somaliland, Islam is extremely important to the Somali sense of national identity. Many of the Somali social norms come from their religion. For example, men shake hands only with men, and women shake hands with women. Many Somali women cover their heads and bodies with a hijab when they are in public. In addition, Somalis abstain from pork, gambling, and alcohol, and receiving or paying any form of interest. Muslims generally congregate on Friday afternoons for a sermon and group prayer. Accordance with these prohibitions depends on each individual's level of orthodoxy.

Nevertheless there has been Catholic missionary activity. In colonial days, British Somaliland was under the care of the Vicariate Apostolic of Arabia, like the Vicariate Apostolic of the Gallas (including French Somaliland as well as its Ethiopian main territory) confided to the Order of Friars Minor Capuchin.

== Dress and custom ==
=== Dress code ===
The dress code in Somaliland encompasses traditional western and Islamic dress customs. However, most Somalis in this region prefer traditional Islamic dress code while a minority choose to both wear western-style clothing and cultural tradition. Men and women in Somaliland dress different, therefore they are categorised into two sections:

Men in Somaliland wear trousers or a flowing sarong-like traditional kilt known as macawiis. Also, the majority wear shirts and embroidered shawls. Due to Somaliland's Islamic heritage, some Somalis in this region wear long dresses known in the Arab and Islamic worlds as khameez. Somaliland's climate is mainly hot so many men wear an embroidered cap known as koofiyad. Recent years, many men in Somaliland choose to wear suits and ties to look more modern. This Western dress code is dominant amongst members of the Somali upper class and the government.

Women in Somaliland mainly wear a long, billowing dress worn over petticoats which are known as direh in the Somali language. Some women wear a four-yard cloth tied over shoulder and draped around the waist, it is called coantino. All women in Somaliland must wear a headscarf (hijab) due to Somaliland being Muslim. Some women choose to wear the head-to-foot burqa known as the jalabeeb in Somali.

=== Customs and courtesies ===
Somalis warmly greet each other with handshakes, but shaking hands with the opposite sex is avoided but some choose to do so. Common verbal greetings include:

- assalamu alaikum (Peace be upon you)
- subah wanaagsan (good morning)
- galab wanaagsan (good afternoon)
- haben wanaagsan (good night)
- iska waran (How are you?)
- nabat (I'm fine or literally translated it means peace)

Somalis use sweeping hand and arm gestures to dramatize speech. Many ideas are expressed through specific hand gestures. Most of these gestures are performed by women:

- A swift twist of the open hand means "nothing" or "no".
- Snapping fingers may mean "long ago" or and "so on"
- A thumb under the chin indicates "fullness".
- It is impolite to point the sole of one's foot or shoe at another person.
- It is impolite to use the index finger to call somebody; that gesture is used for calling dogs.
- The American "thumbs up" is considered obscene by the majority of Somalis.
