= Salahlay District =

Salahley
- District
- Location of Salahlay District in Maroodi Jeex, Somaliland
- Country: Somaliland
- Region: Maroodi Jeex
- Capital: Salahlay

Population (2016)
  - Total: 19,235
- Time zone: UTC+3 (EAT)

Salahley District (Somali: Salaxley) is a District in the most Eastern part of the Maroodi Jeex Region in Somaliland. Its capital lies at Salahlay. the district is inhabited exclusively by the Eidagale Clan.

In September 2022, water with traces of crude oil was collected while drilling a well in Salahley. There are fewer clan and political conflicts here. Note that there is also the village of Salahley, located 12 km southeast of Garowe.

== Governor ==
The governor of Salahley (Mayor of Salahley) is also the mayor of Salahley. In 2010 it was Abdirashid Mo'allin (Cabdirashiid Macallin). As of January 2012, Ismaaciil Yuusuf Xuseen (Shiine) was governor. In December 2012, Salahley's assembly elected Maxamuud Ibraahin Xandule as governor and Naasir Cabdi IImaan as deputy governor. However, some council members were absent from the meeting. In March 2014, Ismaaciil Yuusuf Xuseen (Shiine) commented on an incident that occurred in his neighborhood as governor of Salahley. In August 2020, Ismaaciil Yuusuf Xuseen (Shiine), as governor of Salahley, thanked Telesom for its donation to disaster relief. In March 2023, the Salahley council voted to dismiss Mayor Axmed Buraale Iimaan, but Somaliland's interior minister said the resolution was against the law. In February 2024, the mayor was dismissed by the council and Maxamed Cabdi Haariye was appointed mayor and Maxamuud Baddel Guuleed was appointed deputy mayor.

== History ==
In 2012, construction began on a road connecting Salahley and the Capital city of Hargeisa. In March 2014, one person was wounded in a battle near the village of Toon after a confrontation between a group supporting a councilor from the Hargiesa City and another from the Salahley district. In September 2015, a three-month drought in western Somaliland resulted in deaths in Salahley village. In March 2018, the dam was rehabilitated in cooperation with the Somaliland government and international organizations such as UNDP to provide water to pastoralists in Salahley district and elsewhere. In July 2018, there was significant damage in the Salahley area due to pests such as Tomato Leafminer.

In June 2020, locust damage was widespread in Somaliland, with the Salahley area in the Maroodi Jeex region being the most affected. In May 2020, the road connecting Hargeisa and Salahley was almost completed. In June, discussions were held with the Somali Regional Government of Ethiopia and Salahley regarding a road connecting Hargeisa to Ina Guuxaa, a border town with Ethiopia, and then to Aware, Ethiopia. In August 2020, the Salahley district was hit by torrential rains and strong winds that resulted in the complete or partial destruction of 52 buildings, 28 temporary buildings, and 11 traditional houses throughout the district. In June 2021, parliamentary elections were held in Somaliland, and in Salahley district, four members of the Kulmiye party (headed by Axmed Buraale Iiman), three members of UCID (headed by Maxamed Cabdi Haariye), and two from the Wadani party (headed by Xasan Dheeg Good Xasan Dheeg Good) were elected. During this election, the election office of a female candidate was attacked and election equipment was destroyed, but the Somaliland Electoral Commission and the Ministry of Interior acted quickly to resolve the issue.

In March 2022, Salahley District Selected MPs dispatched water trucks to 24 drought-stricken towns and villages in the district. In October 2022, oil was reportedly discovered in the Salahley district. Samples taken were analyzed in England. In October 2022, the Ministry of Interior of Somaliland decided to transfer the administration of Toon, Maadhyaal, Xadhig xadhig, Galoole and Jagac from Salahley district to Hargiesa City . In December 2022, ActionAid reported that more than 20 percent of the residents in and around the Salahley area were displaced after five consecutive years of insufficient rainfall in the area. In May 2023, the Ministry of Agriculture of Somaliland established an agricultural reservoir in Salahley district. 1,250 former pastoralists are working as farmers.
