= Egal Shidad =

Somali folk tale character

Egal Shidad (Somali: Cigaal Shiidaad, Egal Shidad); is a folk character who was known as a legendary man.

From Somalia, Egal Shidad was known for his dislike of wild animals and his inability to take risks. Like many Somali people, Shidad was a nomadic herder of camel and sheep. He traveled the land with his herd in search of water and pasture. Though he was a coward, Shidad was also wise. This resulted into many miscellaneous adventures.

Because of his stories Shidad has come to be known as a folk legend among the Somalis.
