= State of the Nation (Somaliland) =

The State of the Nation (Somali: Khudbad Sannadeedka Madaxweynaha, Arabic: محاضرة حالة الدولة), is a speech made annually by the President of Somaliland at a joint session of the Parliament (House of Representatives and House of Elders). It covers the economic, social, and financial state of the country.

== See also ==
- Muse Bihi Abdi
- Politics of Somaliland
