= Hargeisa International Book Fair =

Annual cultural event in Somaliland

- Status: Active
- Genre: Multi-genre
- Venue: Hargeysa Cultural Centre Hall
- Locations: Hargeisa, Somaliland
- Country: Somaliland
- Inaugurated: 2008
- Attendance: 10,000
- Organizer: Redsea Online Culture Foundation
- Website: www.hargeysabookfair.com

The Hargeisa International Book Fair (HIBF) (Somali: Bandhigga Caalamiga ah ee Buugaagta Hargeysa) is an annual cultural event in the republic of Somaliland. It is one of the largest public book fairs in the Horn of Africa. Every summer, HIBF brings writers, poets, artists and thinkers from Somaliland and from all over the world gather to share and discuss their art and literary productions with a wider audience. The main goal of the festival is to promote a culture of reading and writing in the region by producing and publishing high quality Somali literature and translating international classical literature (including fiction, poetry and drama) into Somali. Organized by the Redsea Online Culture Foundation, the event aims to enable young people to access a range of cultural heritages, with the intention of stimulating the revival of all forms of art and human expression, including painting, poetry reciting, story-telling, drama composition and writing.

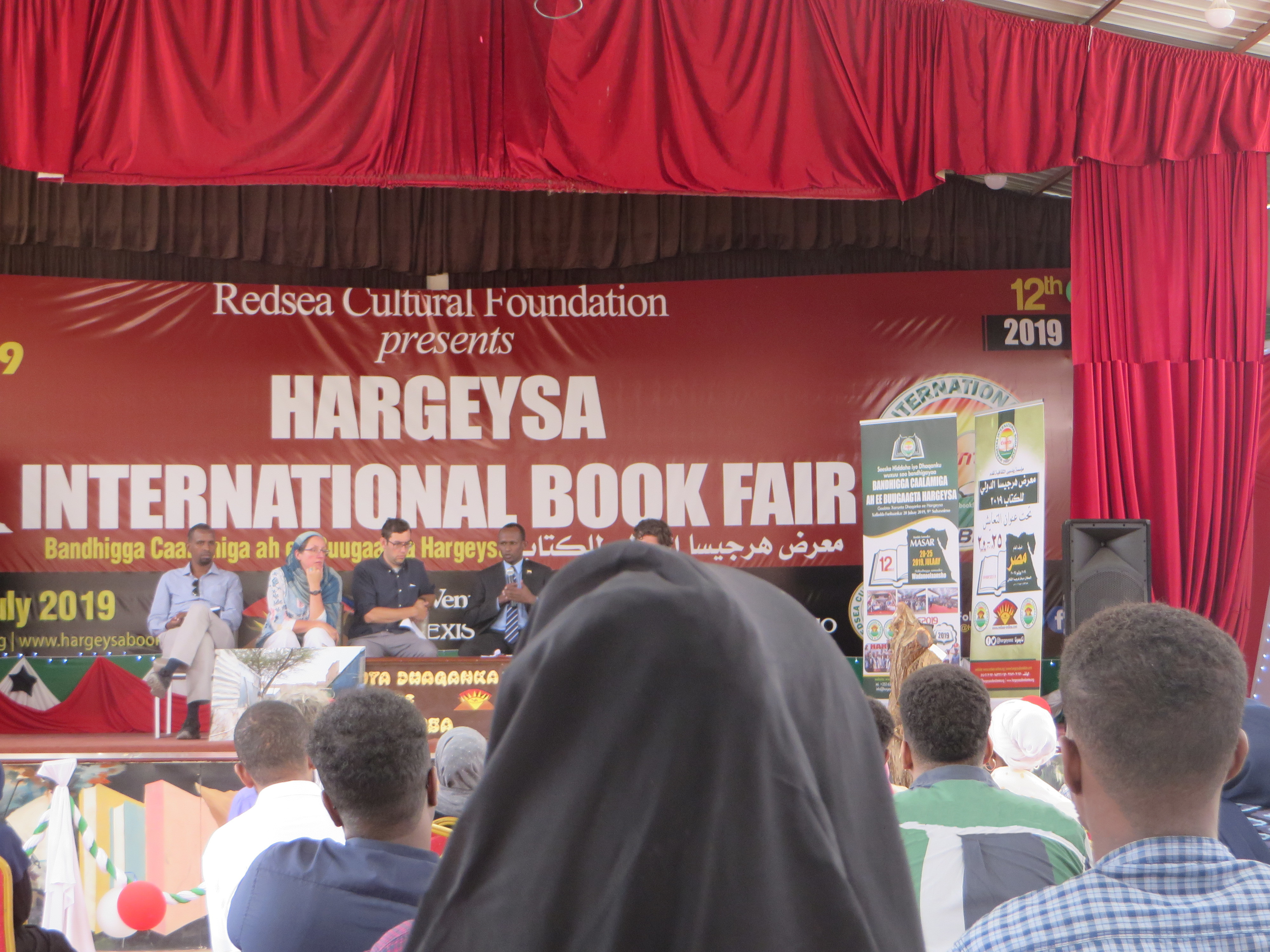
12th Hargeysa International Book Fair (20-25 July 2019)

== History ==
=== Origins ===
The Hargeisa International Book Fair was inaugurated in 2008 by Jama Musse Jama, who serves as Director. It grew from 200 to 10,000 participants over the following six years.

=== Significance ===
HIBF targets not only a young audience, but wider sectors of society. It aims to help foster cultural understanding, tolerance, democracy, and an appreciation of the diversity of Somali culture and literature. In the past few years, the Redsea Online Culture Foundation's festivals have served to raise the profile of reading and writing in the Somaliland region, and also unite youth from different provinces in the area. The main goal of the book fair is to promote critically thinking cultural and creative writing, to facilitate the habit of reading, to display books, from both local and writers abroad, to encourage members in the public to browse, read, engage with authors, serve as an inspiration to young people, and the wider society.

=== Parallel events and joint ventures ===
Somaliland Moving Library: The Moving Library Tour is the Book Fair's flagship outreach event.it takes place a week before the opening of the festival in Hargeisa and is held across all regions of Somaliland. It aims to bring the ethos and principles of the Book Fair – of citizenship and creative freedoms – closer to aspiring writers and readers outside of the city.

== Guests of honour and themes ==
Year	Guest of honour	Focus of interest	Theme of the year	Motto
2026, July 25-30	Eswatini		Theme: Continuity	
2025, July 26-31	Zambia		Theme: Africa	
2024, July 20-25	Tunisia		Theme: Togetherness	
2023, July 22-27	Morocco		Theme: Resilience	
2022, July 23-28	Senegal		Theme: Solidarity	
2021, July 24-29	Ethiopia		Theme: Neighbourhood	
2020, July *-*	Covid		Theme: COVID19	
2019, July 20-25	Egypt		Theme: Coexistence	
2018, July 21-26	Rwanda		Theme: Wisdom	
2017, July 22-27	South Africa		Theme: Connectivity	
2016, July 23-28	Ghana		Theme: Leadership	
2015, August 1-6	Nigeria		Theme: Spaces	
2014, August 8-13	Malawi		Theme: Imagination	Set Your Imaginations Free, Higher Still, And Still Higher
2013	United Kingdom	British literature	Theme: Journey	
2012, July 13 - 18	Djibouti	Djiboutian literature	Theme: Future	Faralaab ka dhigo buug (make a book your companion)
2011		Collective memory	Theme: Collective memories	If you love me, give me a book as a gift
2010, July 23-27		Citizenship	Theme: Citizenship	Give me books, not bombs
2009		Censorship	Theme: Censorship	The power of the written word
2008, July 21 - 22		Freedom	Theme: Freedom	Gobannimo bilaash maaha (Freedom is not for free)

== See also ==
- Somalian literature
