= Supreme Court of Somaliland =

Highest court in Somaliland

Supreme Court of the Republic of Somaliland
- المحكمة العليا في صوماليلاند; Maxkamadda Sare ee Jamhuuriyadda Somaliland
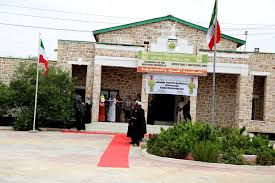
- Supreme Court of Somaliland Building
- Established: 1991
- Jurisdiction: Somaliland
- Location: Hargeisa, Maroodi Jeh
- Authorised by: Constitution of Somaliland
- Number of positions: 14
- Website: Official Website

Chief Justice of Somaliland
- Currently: Adan Haji Ali
- Since: 3 June 2015

The Supreme Court of Somaliland (SCS; Somali: Maxkamadda Sare ee Jamhuuriyadda Somaliland; Arabic: المحكمة العليا في صوماليلاند) is the highest court under the Constitution of Somaliland. The Court holds the power of judicial review, the ability to invalidate a statute for violating a provision of the Constitution. it has ultimate and extensive appellate, original, and advisory jurisdictions on all courts (including the district court and regional court), involving issues of laws and may act on the verdicts rendered on the cases in context in which it enjoys jurisdiction. The court is headed by the chief justice of Somaliland who is appointed by the president of Somaliland, the current president of the Court is Adan Haji Ali.

== See also ==
- List of chief justices of the Supreme Court of Somaliland
- Ministry of Justice (Somaliland)
- Politics of Somaliland
