= Adan Haji Ali =

Somali lawyer and judge

The Honourable Chief Justice of Somaliland Adan Haji Ali CJS
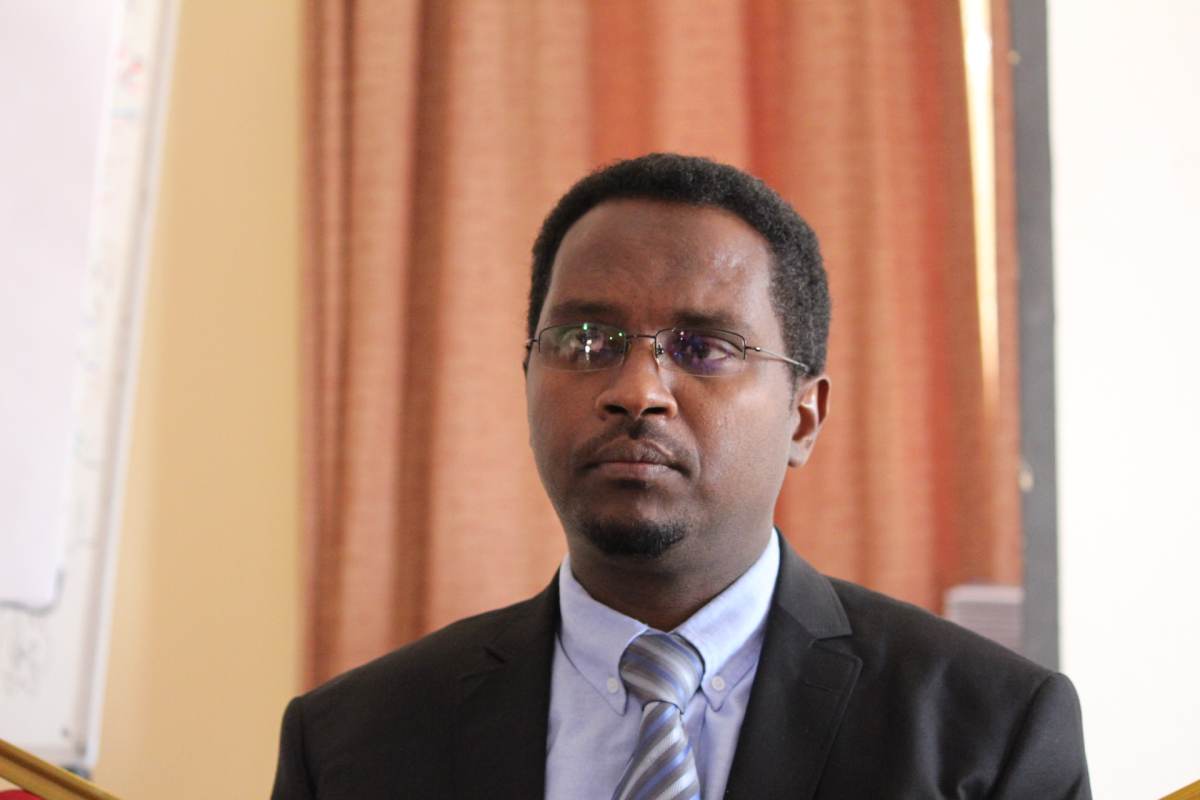

Chief Justice of Somaliland
- Incumbent
- Assumed office 3 June 2015
- Appointed by: Ahmed Mohamed Mohamoud
- Preceded by: Yusuf Ismail Ali

Adan Haji Ali Ahmed (Somali: Aadan Xaaji Cali Axmed) is a Somalilander lawyer and jurist who serves as the Chief Justice of the Supreme Court of Somaliland since his appointment by President Ahmed Mohamed Mohamoud in 2015. Prior to his tenure as Chief Justice, Ali worked at the University of Hargeisa. His tenure as Chief Justice has seen the expansion of the court system and the completion of the Supreme Court Library.

== Early life ==
Adan Haji Ali is a lawyer. At the University of Hargeisa he was the director of the Institute of Peace and Conflict Studies. He was chair of the Somaliland Non-state Actors Forum (SONSAF).

== Career ==
President Ahmed Mohamed Mohamoud appointed Ali to be Chief Justice of the Supreme Court of Somaliland in 2015, after he dismissed Chief Justice Yusuf Ismail Ali. The House of Representatives and House of Elders approved his nomination without opposition. As chief justice Ali administers of the oath of office for the president of Somaliland and ministers and the Supreme Court validates the results of elections.

During Ali's tenure new courts were established in twelve districts in which there were no courts. As a result of the COVID-19 pandemic Ali instituted a partial lockdown of the judiciary. The Supreme Court Library was completed in 2024, and it is a central location of legal documents for use by judicial officials and researchers.

In 2015, Ali was critical of the House of Representatives for suspending oil storage tank transfers to Berbera, stating that it was a political move.

== Works cited ==
=== News ===
- "Somaliland chief Justice Adam Haji-Ali Ahmed announced partial judiciary Lockdown because of Covid-19". Somaliland Sun. Archived from the original on 20 June 2025.
- "Somaliland oo ansixisay Gudoomiyaha Maxkamadda sare". BBC. 3 June 2015. Archived from the original on 20 June 2025.
- "Supreme Court Chief Justice Shares 2024 Judicial Performance Insights". Somaliland Standard. 4 May 2025. Archived from the original on 20 June 2025.
- ""Waxay iila Muuqataa In La Siyaasadeeyay Haamaha Shiidaalka, Garsoorkuna…." Guddoomiyaha Maxkamadda Sare". Dawan. 9 September 2015. Archived from the original on 20 June 2025.
- Hassan, Abdalle (12 February 2022). "Somaliland: Chief Justice Swears in New Gov't Officials". Madaxtooyada. Archived from the original on 20 June 2025.
- Jama, Guleid (27 September 2016). "Somaliland: Chief Justice Starts Combating Corruption at the Judiciary". Dawan. Archived from the original on 20 June 2025.
- Walaaleeye, Maxamuud (29 November 2024). "Supreme Constitutional Court validates the Somaliland 2024 presidential and political party elections, approves the preliminary declared results". Dawan. Archived from the original on 20 June 2025.

=== Web ===
- Jama, Guleid; Street, Jordan (21 November 2018). "The missing link: improving access to justice in Somaliland". Saferworld. Archived from the original on 20 June 2025.
