= 2021 Somaliland municipal elections =

Elections in Somaliland

- 31 May 2021
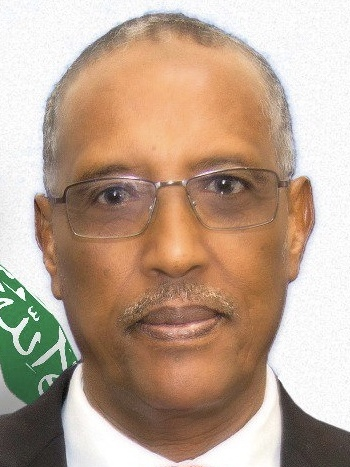

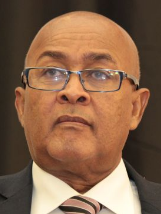

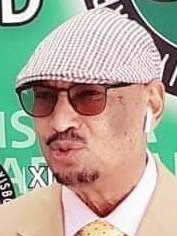
	First party	Second party	Third party
Leader	Muse Bihi Abdi	Abdirahman Mohamed Irro	Faysal Ali Warabe
Party	Kulmiye	Waddani	UCID
Last election	99 seats 30.19%	68 seats 20.20%	40 seats 12.96%
Seats won	93	79	48
Seat change	▼6	▲11	▲8
Popular vote	268,815	260,841	159,801
Percentage	38.99%	37.83%	23.18%
- Map of the electoral results, showing the party with the highest number of seats by districts. Kulmiye Waddani UCID No elections held (dispute with Puntland)

Mayoral and local district council elections were held in Somaliland on 31 May 2021 alongside parliamentary elections, after multiple delays. On 12 July 2020, Somaliland's major political parties reached a landmark agreement to ensure timely elections and to advance preparations for the elections. Negotiations between the parties and the National Electoral Commission settled on the earliest possible date by which the latter believed it would have sufficient time to prepare for the polls.

== Number of voters ==
The number of voters in the parliamentary and Local Council elections in Somaliland 2021

1,065,847 people registered to vote in Somaliland's local elections. 552 candidates vied for 220 seats.

== Results ==
Preliminary results showed that Kulmiye won a plurality of seats with Waddani close behind, while UCID came in third place. Out of the 220 elected local councillors, 217 were men and 3 were women.

Party	Votes	%	Seats	+/–
Kulmiye Peace, Unity, and Development Party	268,815	38.99	93	−6
Waddani	260,841	37.83	79	+11
Justice and Welfare Party	159,801	23.18	48	+8
Total	689,457	100.00	220	–
Registered voters/turnout	1,065,847	–		
Source: SLNEC

=== By District ===
District	UCID		Kulmiye		Waddani	
District	%	Seats	%	Seats	%	Seats
Erigavo	15.4	2	38.5	5	46.2	6
Las Anod	23.1	3	38.5	5	38.5	5
Salahlay	33.3	3	44.4	4	22.2	2
Garadag	22.2	2	44.4	4	33.3	3
Oodweyne	9.1	1	36.4	4	54.5	6
Lughaya	22.2	2	55.6	5	22.2	2
Zeila	27.3	3	36.4	4	36.4	4
Baligubadle	22.2	2	44.4	4	33.3	3
Baki	11.1	1	33.3	3	55.6	5
Sheikh	33.3	3	33.3	3	33.3	3
Aynaba	33.3	3	44.4	4	22.2	2
Hudun	0.0	0	77.8	7	22.2	2
Taleh	0.0	0	66.7	6	33.3	3
Buhotle	18.2	2	36.4	4	45.5	5
El Afweyn	27.3	3	45.5	5	27.3	3
Borama	23.1	3	38.5	5	38.5	5
Burao	30.8	4	30.8	4	38.5	5
Berbera	23.1	3	46.2	6	30.8	4
Gabiley	30.8	4	38.5	5	30.8	4
Hargeisa	23.5	4	35.3	6	41.2	7
Las Khorey	No elections held					
Total	21.82	48	42.27	93	35.91	79
Total seats: 220
