= Asha Addo =

- village
- Location of Asha Addo
- Coordinates: 11°10′28″N 43°26′19″E
- Country: Somalia
- Region: Awdal
- District: Zeila
- Elevation: 18 m (59 ft)

Population
  - Total: 421
- Postal code: 252

Asha Addo (Somali: Caashacado) is a village located in the Zeila district of the Awdal Region, in Somalia.
The village lies on both sides of a wadi (a mostly dry riverbed) in the Guban, a desert-like coastal steppe. It has a mosque and 2 telecom masts. The main road from Djibouti to Somalia's Hargeisa passes through Asha Addo; it is no more than a sandy track in these parts.

== Demographics ==
As of 2012, the population of Asha Addo has been estimated to be 421. The inhabitants belong to the Somali ethnic group, from the Issa.

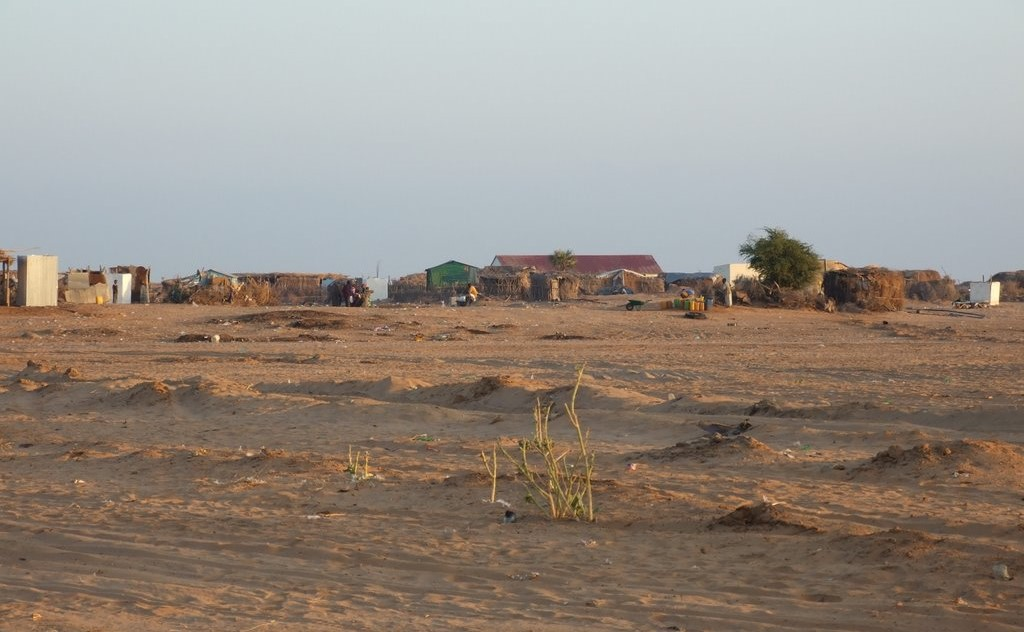
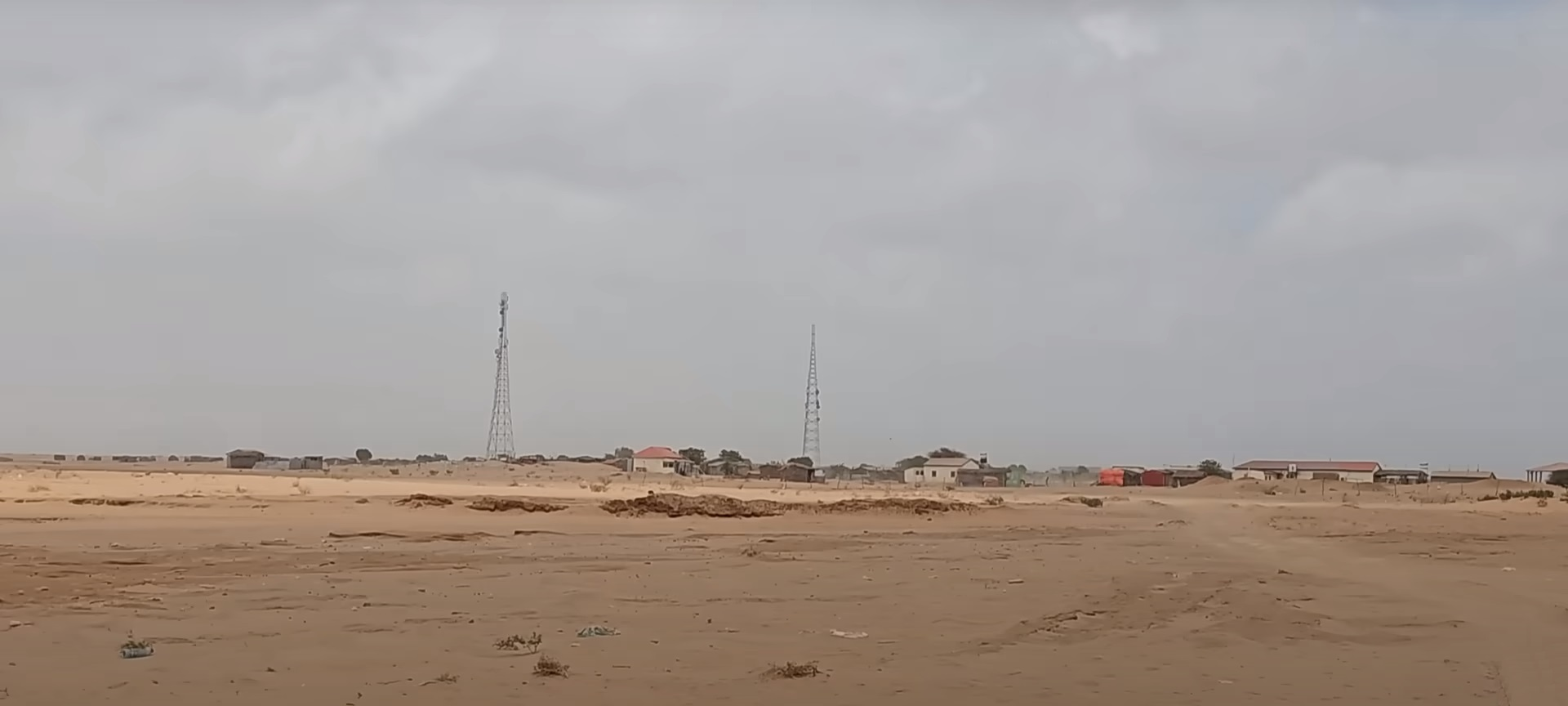
Two views of Asha Addo (Caashacado)

== See also ==
- Administrative divisions of Somaliland
- Regions of Somaliland
- Districts of Somaliland
