= Abdulqaadir =

- Village
- Location in Somaliland
- Coordinates: 10°33′03″N 42°51′48″E
- Country: Somaliland
- Region: Awdal
- District: Zeila
- Elevation: 730 m (2,400 ft)

Population
  - Total: c.567

Abdulqaadir is a village located in western Awdal, Somaliland.

== Demographics ==
As of 2012, the population of Abdulqaadir has been estimated to be 567. The inhabitants belong to various mainly Afro-Asiatic-speaking ethnic groups, with the Issa subclan of the Dir especially well represented.
