= Dilla, Awdal =

Town in Awdal, Somaliland

Dilla ديلا
- Town
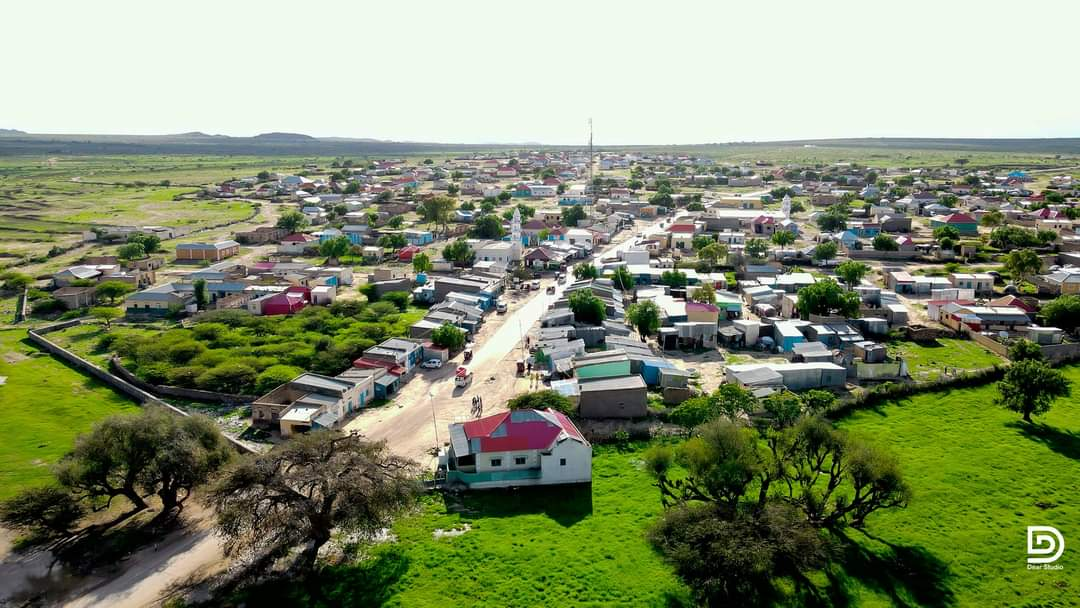
- Skyline in Dilla c. 2023

- Location within Awdal Location within Somaliland
- Coordinates: 9°46′46″N 43°20′40″E
- Country: Somaliland
- Region: Awdal
- District: Baki
- Time zone: UTC+3 (EAT)
- Climate: BSh

Dilla is a town located in the western Awdal region of Somaliland. It lies between the city of Borama and Kalabaydh town. The town is presently part of Baki district.

== Demographics ==
There is no census on the town population, but the district of Baki has a population of 96,885 people. Dilla is exclusively inhabited by the Mohamuud Nuur, one of the two sub divisions of Reer Nuur, a subclan of the Gadabuursi.

R. J. Hayward and I. M. Lewis (2005) both state that Dilla is the major town and region of the Reer Mohamuud Nuur:

"The major town of the Rer Mohamoud Nur, Dila."

== See also ==
- Administrative divisions of Somaliland
- Regions of Somaliland
- Districts of Somaliland
