= Abasa, Awdal =

Abasa Abaaso
- Ancient ruin
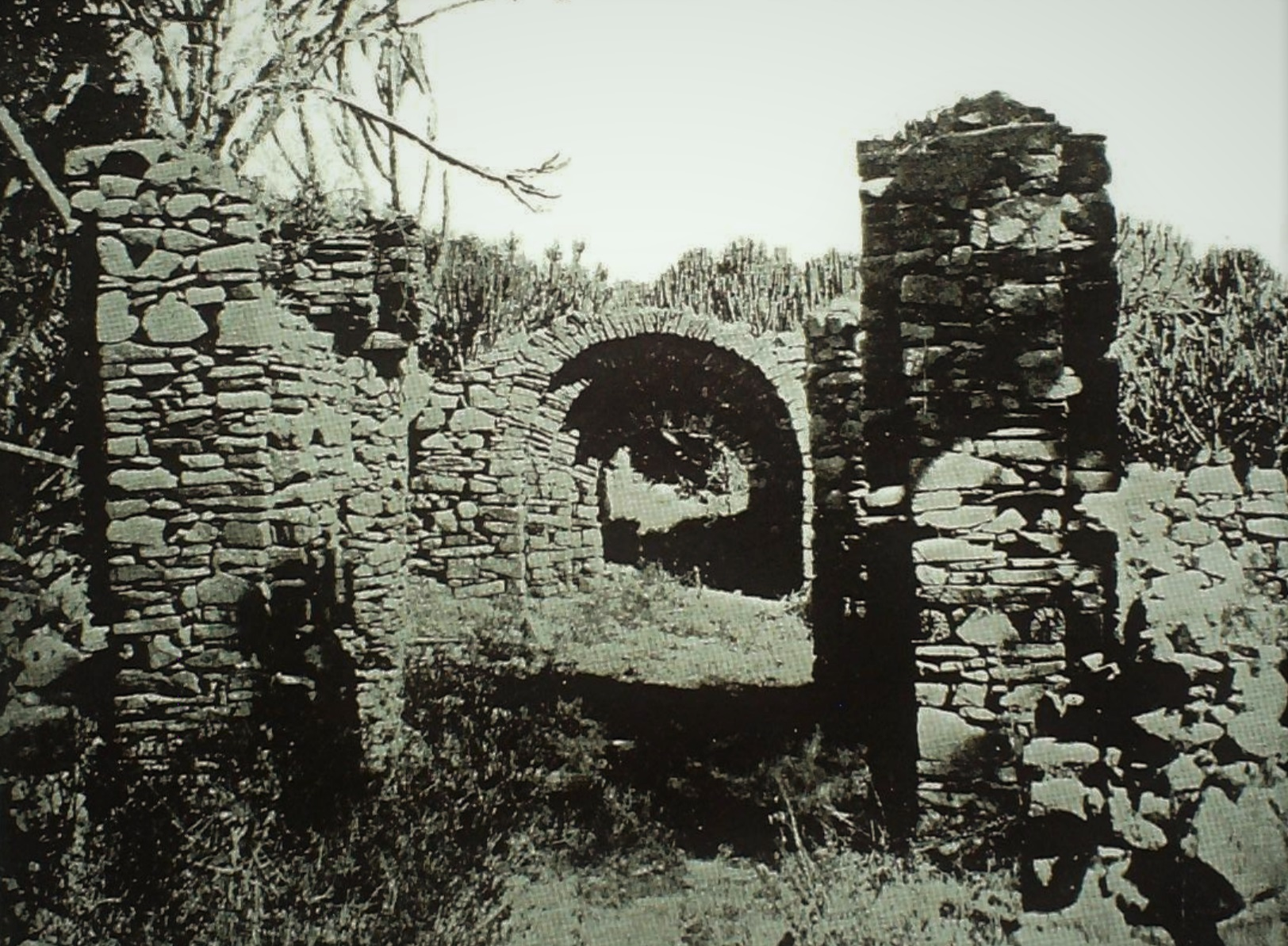
- Ruins of an Ancient Mosque in Abasa

- Location in Somaliland. Abasa (Somaliland)
- Coordinates: 10°08′00″N 43°13′00″E
- Country: Somaliland
- Province: Awdal
- Time zone: UTC+3 (EAT)

Abasa (also spelled: Abbasa, Abbaso) (Somali: Abaaso) is an ancient town in the northwestern Awdal region of Somaliland. In ancient times it served as the capital of both Queen Kola's Kingdom and Kingdom of Adal.

== Overview ==
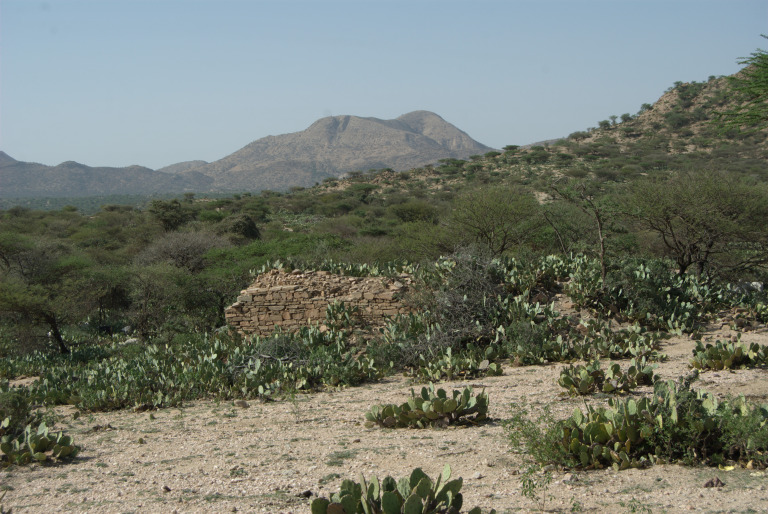
Ruins of an old ancient uninhabited house in Abasa

Abasa is situated around 50 km to the north of Borama, the capital city of the Awdal Region in Somaliland, and about 15 km to the east of Boon, Awdal.

Philip Briggs (2012) describes the ruins of Abasa:

"Abasa, the most impressive of the ruins around Borama, is accessible by 4x4 only. It's a bone rattling 2-hour drive that entails following the Zeila road northwest, then heading northeast to the village of Bon (or Bown), before taking a rough 15km track to the east."

Abasa is situated over 1,000 m above sea level. The old town contained over 200 houses, each built with stone walls and mason ranging from single room to multi-roomed courtyard houses. Niches were cut in the walls for storage, and they were roofed with brushwood laid over wooden rafters. The mosques were more ambitiously planned.

A large town, it features numerous ruined structures stretching over a wide area. The buildings were built in a rectangular style, and the now ruined Abasa Mosque has large columns of two different types: cylindrical and cruciform. 14th to 16th century Islamic pottery and Chinese sherds have also been found here, which are believed to be relics from the Adal Sultanate's commercial activities.

== History ==
Former Capital City of the Kingdom of Adal

The Portuguese Jesuits described Abasa as the capital of the Kingdom of Adal during their travels to the region as mentioned in The Travels of the Jesuits in Ethiopia:

"It might perhaps be to called from Abaxa, the Capital City of the Kingdom of Adel."

The Fort of Queen Kola

Richard Francis Burton (1856) describes Abasa as home to the Fort of Queen Kola, a powerful Queen who fought with the neighbouring town of Awbube in an ancient conflict, in his book First Footsteps in East Africa:

"After an hour’s ride we turned away from the Abbaso Fiumara and entered a basin among the hills distant about sixteen miles from the Holy Tree. This is the site of Darbiyah Kola — Kola’s Fort — so called from its Galla queen. It is said that this city and its neighbour Aububah fought like certain cats in Kilkenny till both were “eaten up:” the Gudabirsi fix the event at the period when their forefathers still inhabited Bulhar on the coast — about 300 years ago. If the date be correct, the substantial ruins have fought a stern fight with time. Remnants of houses cumber the soil, and the carefully built wells are filled with rubbish: the palace was pointed out to me with its walls of stone and clay intersected by layers of woodwork. The mosque is a large roofless building containing twelve square pillars of rude masonry, and the Mihrab, or prayer niche, is denoted by a circular arch of tolerable construction. But the voice of the Muezzin is hushed for ever, and creepers now twine around the ruined fane. The scene was still and dreary as the grave; for a mile and a half in length all was ruins — ruins — ruins."

The reference to Queen Kola, as Galla or infidel by Richard Francis Burton (1856), denotes that she reigned in Abasa during the pre-Islamic period of the region. The term Galla or infidel was a Somali term that referred to the pre-Islamic inhabitants of the region, not to be confused with the same word (Galla), a derogatory term for the Oromo. Taking into consideration the clearly Islamic features of the town and fort complete with ruined mosques and temples, there is evidence to plausibly suggest that Queen Kola could also have been an Islamic era Queen.

Richard Francis Burton (1856) also describes when he visited the battlefield:

"Thence we proceeded to the battle-field, a broad sheet of sandstone, apparently dinted by the hoofs of mules and horses: on this ground, which, according to my guides, was in olden days soft and yielding, took place the great action between Aububah and Darbiyah Kola."

Abasa and the Fort of Queen Kola was visited by many European travellers, explorers and archaeologists. Amongst them Richard Francis Burton in 1854-1855, Alexander T. Curle in the 1930s, Neville Chittick in 1978 and French scholars François-Xavier Fauvelle-Aymar and Bernard Hirsch in 2004.

Gadabuursi tomb and burial practices in Abasa

Richard Francis Burton (1856) describes traditional Gadabuursi tomb and burial practices in Abasa in great detail in his book First Footsteps in East Africa:

"At 9 A.M. we crossed the Lesser Abbaso, a Fiumara with high banks of stiff clay and filled with large rolled stones: issuing from it, we traversed a thorny path over ascending ground between higher hills, and covered with large boulders and step-like layers of grit. Here appeared several Gudabirsi tombs, heaps of stones or pebbles, surrounded by a fence of thorns, or an enceinte of loose blocks: in the latter, slabs are used to make such houses as children would build in play, to denote the number of establishments left by the deceased. The new grave is known by the conical milk-pails surmounting the stick at the head of the corpse, upon the neighbouring tree is thrown the mat which bore the dead man to his last home, and hard by are the blackened stones upon which his funeral feast was cooked."

Richard Francis Burton (1856) describes the Abasa Valley in the Gadabuursi country as amongst the most beautiful spots he has seen:

"At half past three reloading we followed the course of the Abbaso Valley, the most beautiful spot we had yet seen. The presence of mankind, however, was denoted by the cut branches of thorn encumbering the bed: we remarked too, the tracks of lions pursued by hunters, and the frequent streaks of serpents, sometimes five inches in diameter."

== Demographics ==
The region around the ancient town is inhabited by the Reer Ahmed branch of the Jibriil Yoonis and the Musafin branch of Habar 'Affan, both subclans of the Gadabuursi Dir clan.

== See also ==
- Administrative divisions of Somaliland
- Regions of Somaliland
- Districts of Somaliland
