= Magala-Cad District =

- District
- Country: Somaliland
- Region: Awdal
- Time zone: UTC+3 (EAT)

Magala-Cad District is a district in the northwestern Awdal region of Somaliland. The District is on the eastern edge of Awdal and is exclusively inhabited by the Reer Nuur and Jibrain subclans of the Gadabuursi clan.

== See also ==
- Administrative divisions of Somaliland
- Regions of Somaliland
- Districts of Somaliland
