= 2021 Somaliland parliamentary election =

- 31 May 2021

All 82 seats in the House of Representatives 42 seats needed for a majority
- Registered: 1,065,847
- Turnout: 65.3%
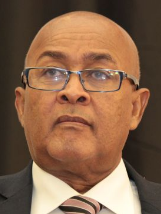

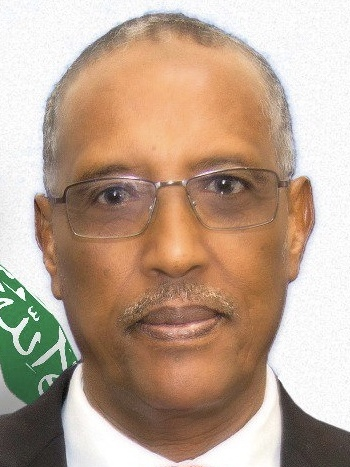

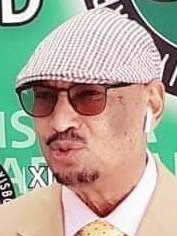
	First party	Second party	Third party
Leader	Abdirahman Mohamed Abdullahi	Muse Bihi Abdi	Faysal Ali Warabe
Party	Waddani	Kulmiye	UCID
Leader since	2012	2010	2001
Last election	–	34.06%, 28 seats	26.93%, 21 seats
Seats won	31	30	21
Seat change	New	▲2	Steady
Popular vote	259,144	257,020	179,937
Percentage	37.23%	36.92%	25.85%
Swing	New	▲2.86pp	▼1.08pp
- Results by region
Speaker before election
Bashe Mohamed Farah
Kulmiye
Speaker
Abdirisak Khalif
Waddani

Parliamentary elections were held in Somaliland on 31 May 2021, alongside local district elections. The election was Somaliland's first parliamentary election since 2005, and politicians pointed to the election as evidence of its political stability. Three parties – the populist Somaliland National Party (Waddani), the centre-left Justice and Welfare Party (UCID), and the ruling party, the liberal Kulmiye Peace, Unity, and Development Party – put forward 246 candidates who competed for 82 seats in the House of Representatives. More than one million people, out of about four million residents total, registered to vote. On 6 June, the National Electoral Commission (NEC) announced that Waddani had received a plurality of seats with 31; Kulmiye received 30, and UCID received 21. As no party had received an outright majority, Waddani and UCID announced they would form a political alliance.

The election was tentatively scheduled and postponed numerous times since the last parliamentary election in 2005. The vote was scheduled for March and then August 2019 before the NEC declared it could not be held that year. After pressure from all three parties in 2020, the NEC agreed to hold an election in May 2021.

Preceding the election, many local politicians expressed hope that it may help Somaliland be recognized as a nation by more members of the international community. President Muse Bihi Abdi and opposition leader Abdirahman Mohamed Abdullahi called for voters to remain peaceful at the polls. The number of polling stations increased by 61 percent from the 2017 presidential election, and 103 international observers came to monitor the polls and ensure election security.

== Background ==
Somaliland, a self-declared sovereign state in the Horn of Africa which declared independence from Somalia in 1991, had not held elections to parliament since 2005. Unlike Somalia, which has experienced three decades of civil war, Somaliland has largely maintained peace.

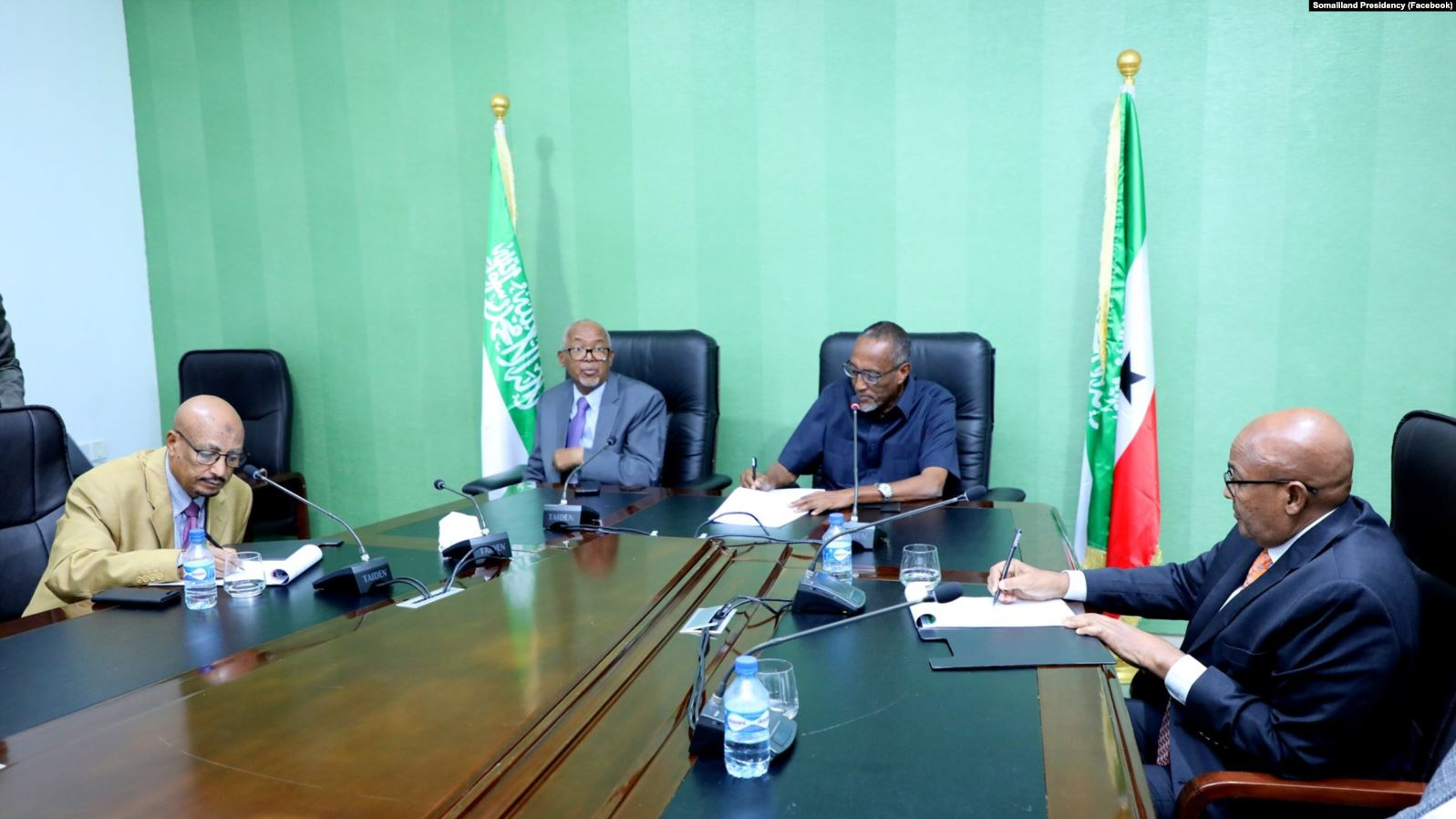
Somaliland party leaders agree on 2021 election terms, 12 July 2020

The parliamentary election had been consistently delayed since 2005. In 2015, Somaliland was supposed to hold a joint presidential and parliamentary election; both were postponed following drought and political controversies. Delays in voter registration, caused by droughts forcing pastoralists to migrate, caused a tentative date of March 2017 to be pushed back as well. Negotiations between all three political parties and the National Electoral Commission (NEC) led to the scheduling of the 2017 presidential election, which proceeded as planned, and a parliamentary election in April 2019. The election was delayed and rescheduled for August 2019, when it was also delayed. On 12 July 2020, Somaliland's three national political parties reached an agreement to hold parliamentary and local elections by the end of the year. After several weeks of negotiations with the NEC on the practicality of organizing elections in that time, a revised date of May 2021 was settled upon.

Local politicians called the election evidence of Somaliland's stability, and expressed hope that a successful democratic election would potentially increase Somaliland's international recognition. Ahmed Dheere, the vice-chairman of the ruling Kulmiye Peace, Unity, and Development Party, told reporters "I cannot tell you how important these elections are. We will be the sunshine of the Horn of Africa if we have successful polls". Mark Bradbury, director of the Rift Valley Institute, said that "Somaliland could well end up as the only place in the Horn of Africa that has any form of democratic election at all this year". Both president Muse Bihi Abdi and opposition leader Abdirahman Mohamed Abdullahi called for peace from voters.

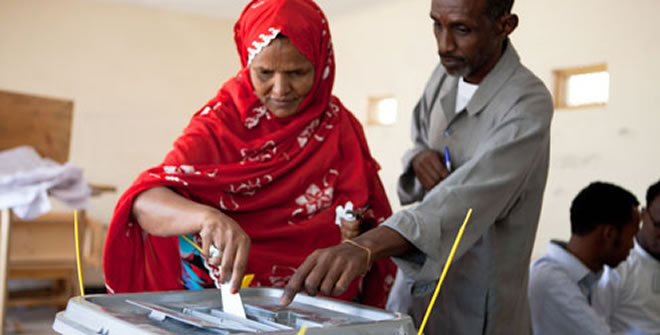
A woman voting in Somaliland

Before the election, the House of Representatives had no members of minority clans and only one woman. In 2021, one member of a minority clan and 13 women ran for office. However, none of the women were elected. Five opposition candidates were arrested before the election, and several journalists were detained. Some politicians criticized the government for perpetually delayed elections and criticized the unelected House of Elders, calling both corrupt and undemocratic. According to activist Ayan Mahamoud, "the two most pressing issues are rights of minority groups such as Gaboye communities and women". Waddani, the major opposition party, made the promotion of women and minorities in society a key issue. The party, aligned with the left wing economically but socially tied to Islamism and nationalism, included in its party manifesto a quorum of women comprising 30 percent of the parliament. Kulmiye, an observer party of the Liberal International, has historically sought the establishment of a market economy but more recently has called for the nationalisation of some companies and a welfare program funded by a wealth tax. Kulmiye was seen as the front-runner ahead of the election. UCID, an observer party of the Socialist International, supports social democratic positions.

== Electoral system ==
The six regions of Somaliland, which also act as electoral constituencies

The 82 MPs in the lower House of Representatives of Somaliland are elected in six multi-member constituencies coterminous with the regions of Somaliland, using open list proportional representation for a five-year term. There is a constitutional limit of three legal political parties at the national level. Residents aged 15 or older are able to vote. The election was the first in Somaliland's history to be supervised by an independent organisation rather than by the president.

Electoral region	Seats
Awdal	13
Sahil	10
Maroodi Jeex	20
Togdheer	15
Sanaag	12
Sool	12

== Conduct ==
Voters in the parliamentary and municipal elections

1,065,847 people registered to vote in the parliamentary election, a record for Somaliland. 246 candidates vied for 82 seats. Polls opened at 7 a.m. on 31 May. Like the 2017 presidential election, the parliamentary election used iris recognition technology; the 2017 election marked the first time such technology was used for a national election. The 2021 election had 2,709 polling stations, an increase of 61 percent from 2017, with more than 30,000 people staffing the polls. International election observers were given broad power by the government to monitor. 103 observers came, including former President of Sierra Leone Ernest Bai Koroma, Kenyan journalist and anti-corruption activist John Githongo, and South African analyst Greg Mills. Somaliland, one of the world's poorest nations with a government budget of $339 million, paid for 70 percent of the election's $21.8 million cost; the rest was funded by the European Union, Sweden, Taiwan, and the United Kingdom. Ambassadors from 10 European nations and a European Union ambassador came to the city of Hargeisa to show support for the election.

== Results ==
Official results of the election took about a week to be announced. The NEC released provisional results of five electoral districts – Garadag, Hudun, Lughaya, Salahlay and Zeila – on 2 June. In those districts, Kulmiye received 24 seats, Waddani received 15, and UCID received 10. The NEC warned government officials and political parties against speculating on election results while counting was still underway.

On 6 June, the NEC published the final results, announcing that Waddani had received 31 seats, Kulmiye had received 30 seats, and UCID had received 21 seats. In a joint statement, Waddani and UCID announced they would form a governing coalition. Waddani and UCID also won a majority of seats together in the municipal elections. Of the 13 female candidates, none were elected to a parliamentary seat.

Party	Votes	%	Seats	+/–
Waddani	259,144	37.23	31	New
Kulmiye Peace, Unity, and Development Party	257,020	36.92	30	+2
Justice and Welfare Party	179,937	25.85	21	0
Total	696,101	100.00	82	0
Registered voters/turnout	1,065,847	–		
Source: EC, SEMO

=== By region ===
Region	UCID			Kulmiye			Waddani			Total seats
Region	Votes	%	Seats	Votes	%	Seats	Votes	%	Seats	Total seats
Awdal	345,130	21.2	3	37,215	41.3	5	33,708	37.4	5	13
Marodi Jeh	64,255	24.4	5	100,334	38.0	8	99,150	37.6	8	20
Sahil	20,412	31.1	3	26,501	40.4	4	18,705	28.5	3	10
Sanaag	21,903	29.2	4	24,670	32.9	4	28,517	38.0	5	12
Sool	16,946	26.9	3	26,842	42.6	5	19,292	30.6	4	12
Togdheer	36,907	26.9	4	40,962	29.9	4	59,286	43.2	6	15
Total	179,553	25.8	22	256,524	36.9	30	258,658	37.2	31	82
Source: Somaliland Election Monitoring Office

== Aftermath ==
Following the election, the British Embassy published a joint statement of the United Kingdom, the European Union, and several European nations congratulating Somaliland on the elections, which they said "demonstrated a strong commitment to the electoral process, to political participation and to strengthening democracy." Michelle D. Gavin of the Council on Foreign Relations praised Somaliland for the election, saying "Somaliland is not perfect; no place on earth is. But in the midst of regional crisis and global democratic backsliding, Somaliland's achievements and dogged commitment to its principles deserve more notice. Somaliland stands as a rebuke to those who claim that authoritarianism is simply the required price of stability in the region, or that democratic principles are a fetish of foreigners with no real traction on the ground."
