= Awdal State Movement =

Political organization in Somalia

The Awdal State Movement (ASM) also knowing as Awdal State Of Somalia, is a political organization that represents the interests of the Awdal region of Somaliland.

Primarily associated with the Gadabuursi community, the ASM advocates for increased regional autonomy within Somalia.

== Origins and background ==
Led by Dr. Ali Ibrahim Bahar, the Awdal State Movement is a political organization advocating for the autonomy of the Awdal region within a united Somalia. Dr. Bahar has highlighted the challenges faced by the Awdal and Gabiley communities under the Somaliland administration, calling for international attention to address what ASM views as systemic neglect and oppression.

Their goals include to prevent a foreign military base being established in Lughaya, Awdal.

Traditionally, Awdal was part of the influential Adal Sultanate, a prominent medieval Muslim state that served as a center of trade and Islamic scholarship.

This rich legacy has been a key influence on ASM's push for self-governance within Somalia.

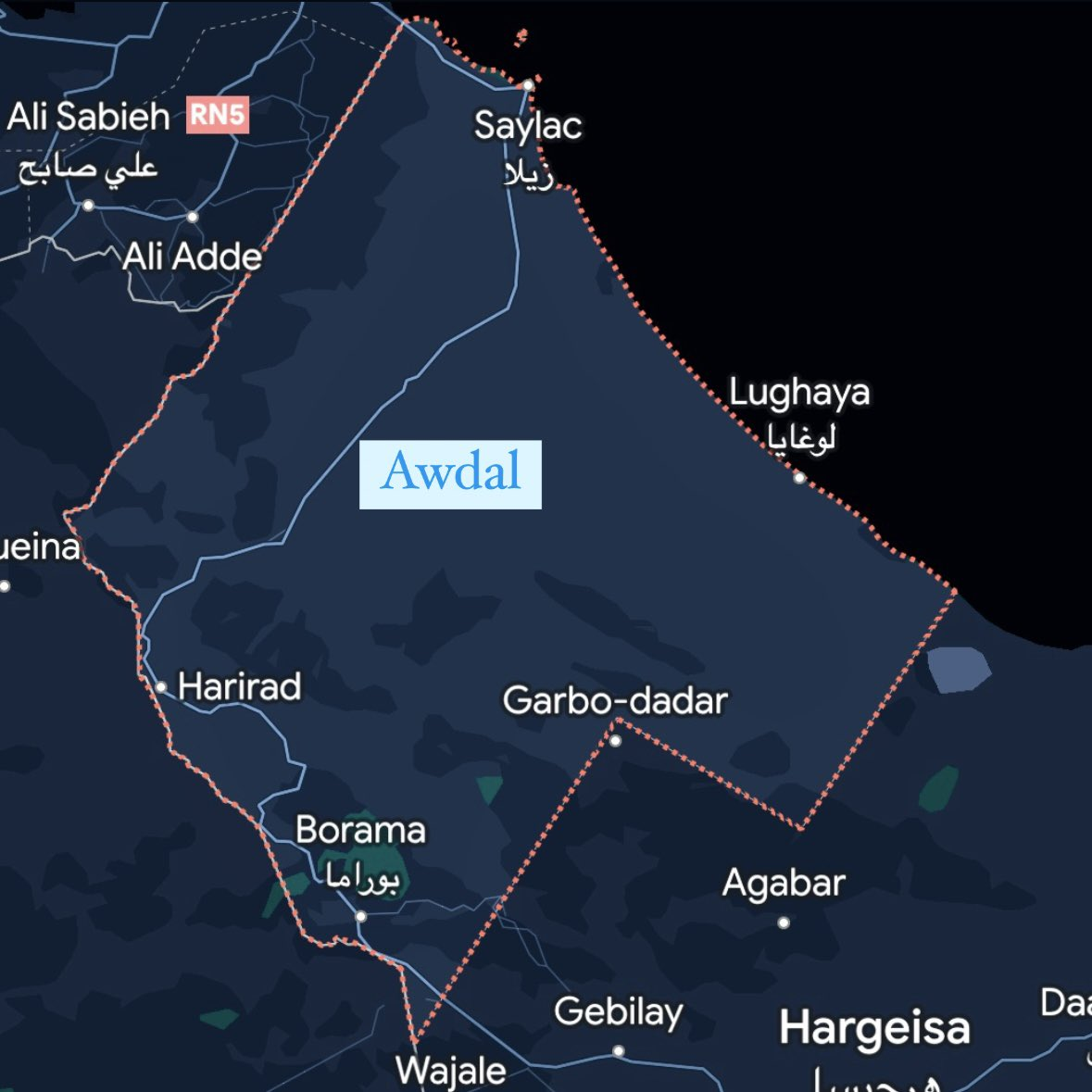
Territory claimed by the Awdal State Movement.

=== Opposition to the Somali National Movement (SNM) ===
The ASM roots, have grown from a consistent and critical stance toward the Somali National Movement (SNM), which was instrumental in Somaliland's establishment following Somalia's collapse in 1991, and attacks against the Awdal region.

Originally backed by Ethiopia, the SNM challenged the Somali central government, later declaring an independent Somaliland, including Awdal, within its claimed borders. However, leaders and communities in Awdal, particularly among the Gadabursi, opposed this incorporation, viewing the SNM's actions as prioritizing external interests over local governance.

During the early 1980s, the Somali National Movement (SNM) received substantial support from Ethiopia under Mengistu Haile Mariam's administration, in order to stage attacks against Somalia. This backing included financial aid and military support, which Ethiopia provided to counter the Somali central government under Siad Barre. Ethiopian involvement with the SNM formed part of its broader strategy to curtail Somalia's influence in the region.

=== Timeline of Significant Events in the Awdal Region ===
Tensions between the SNM and communities in Awdal reached its peak after the SNM attacked Dilla, Awdal in 1991 During this incident, Gadabursi civilians reportedly suffered heavy casualties when attacked by the SNM.

The massacre and attack has since become a symbol of Awdal's grievances with the SNM-led Somaliland administration. ASM leaders frequently refer to this event as a major catalyst for their calls for greater regional autonomy and the preservation of Awdal's distinct cultural and political identity.

==== 1987: Car Bomb Attack near Borama ====
The SNM targeted Somali government forces near the town Borama, resulting in the deaths of eight soldiers, when two military trucks were destroyed by explosives planted by the SNM.

==== Late 1980s: Increased Ethiopian Military Support for SNM ====
Ethiopia provided further support to the SNM with artillery and other resources, allowing for expanded operations in northern Somalia. This assistance enabled the SNM to intensify its campaign against Somali government forces in regions like Awdal.

==== February 1991: Borama and Dilla Attacks ====
SNM forces entered Borama and Dilla, resulting in violence against the Gadabursi population. The United Nations High Commissioner for Refugees (UNHCR) described the incident as involving forced displacement and ethnic cleansing of the Gadabursi.

==== 1991: Widespread Displacement to Ethiopia ====
As violence escalated in Awdal, approximately 80,000 people fled from Borama to Ethiopia to escape the conflict.

==== 1991–1992: Resource and Territorial Conflicts in Awdal ====
After SNM offensives, disputes over water and grazing land intensified in Awdal, contributing to ongoing social and economic tensions.

== Memorandum of understanding between Somaliland and Ethiopia ==
In January 2024, the Somaliland administration signed a memorandum of understanding (MoU) with Ethiopia, which provided Ethiopia access to strategic areas along Somaliland's coast. In exchange, Ethiopia agreed to consider formally recognizing Somaliland's independence.

This MoU has prompted regional and international responses, as it bears potential implications for Somalia's territorial integrity and exploits the Awdal region in the Horn of Africa.

=== Local and regional opposition ===
The MoU has been met with opposition from various groups within Somaliland, especially in the Awdal region. Leaders of the Awdal State Movement (ASM), along with local communities in Lughaya and members of the Gadabursi clan, argue that the agreement compromises Somalia's territorial integrity.

They assert that decisions involving Somali land should be addressed with the involvement of the Somali Federal Government, rather than being handled unilaterally by Somaliland.

=== U.S. congresswoman Ilhan Omar’s statement ===
U.S. congresswoman Ilhan Omar has also raised concerns about the MoU, showing solidarity with those in Awdal who oppose the agreement. As a member of the U.S. House of Representatives who hails from Somali heritage, Omar suggested that the MoU would have destabilizing effects in the Horn of Africa. Omar has highlighted the importance of respecting local and national interests in such decisions, drawing worldwide attention to the situation unfolding in Lughaya.

== International responses and implications ==
The MoU has also drawn responses from international organizations and neighboring countries. Djibouti, Egypt, and the Somali Federal Government have expressed concerns, advocating for agreements that involve all relevant stakeholders to promote regional stability.

Analysts have noted that the agreement could further entrench Ethiopian influence in the Horn of Africa while impacting Djibouti's economic role as Ethiopia's primary port, underscoring the MoU's significance for regional geopolitics.
