= Jidhi =

- Town
- Location of Jidhi in Somaliland Jidhi (Somaliland)
- Coordinates: 10°35′31″N 43°02′53″E
- Country: Somaliland
- Region: Awdal
- District: Borama
- Elevation: 503 m (1,650 ft)

Population
  - Total: 248
- Climate: BWh

Jidhi is a village located in the northwestern part of Awdal region of Somaliland. It sits 134km north of Borama city.

== History ==
The site of the town, like some surrounding towns and villages, was active between the 13th and 17th . Archeological research revealed stone homes, mosques, cemeteries, and imported Chinese and Yemeni pottery.

There is evidence that the people of Jidhi were once nomadic. The biggest archeological cairn field identified so far in Awdal and nomadic mosques was there.

== Local projects ==
=== Investments on local economy ===
Back in 2018, the Somaliland drought response committee reported a severe water shortage and food scarcity. Reports of drought-hit pastoralists were sent daily. Investments in the towns in the area were requested, including for Jidhi.

In 2021 the town was included in the "Islamic Relief Somaliland" project. In 2025, WASH infrastructure investment initiatives and hydrogeological survey assessment came to the town.

== Demographics ==
As of 2012, the population of Jidhi was estimated to be 248. The town inhabitants belong to fuurlabe subclan ciise.
