= Baki, Awdal =

Baki
- Town
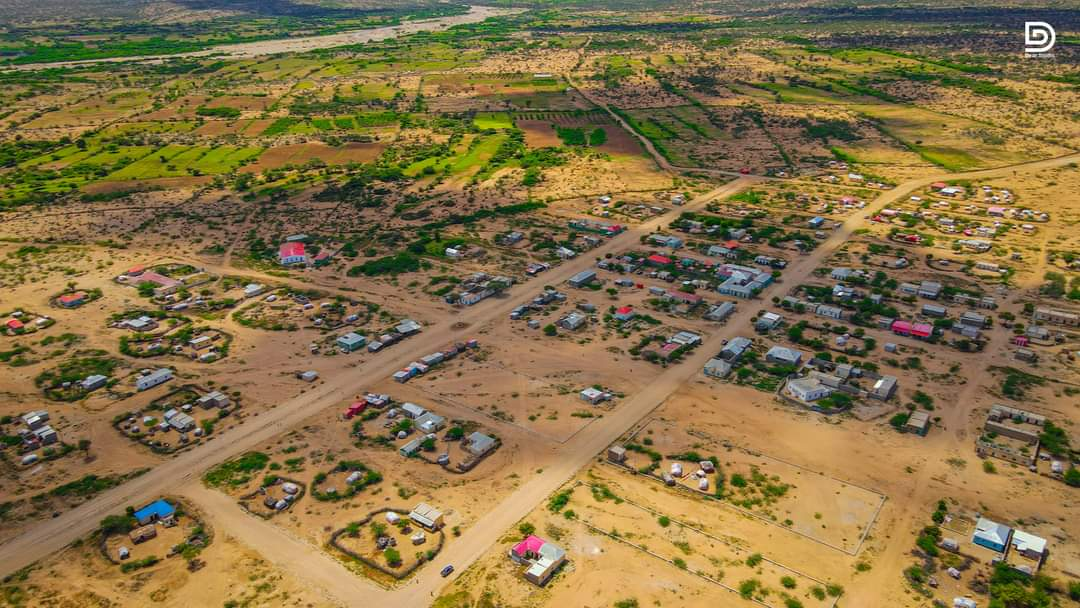
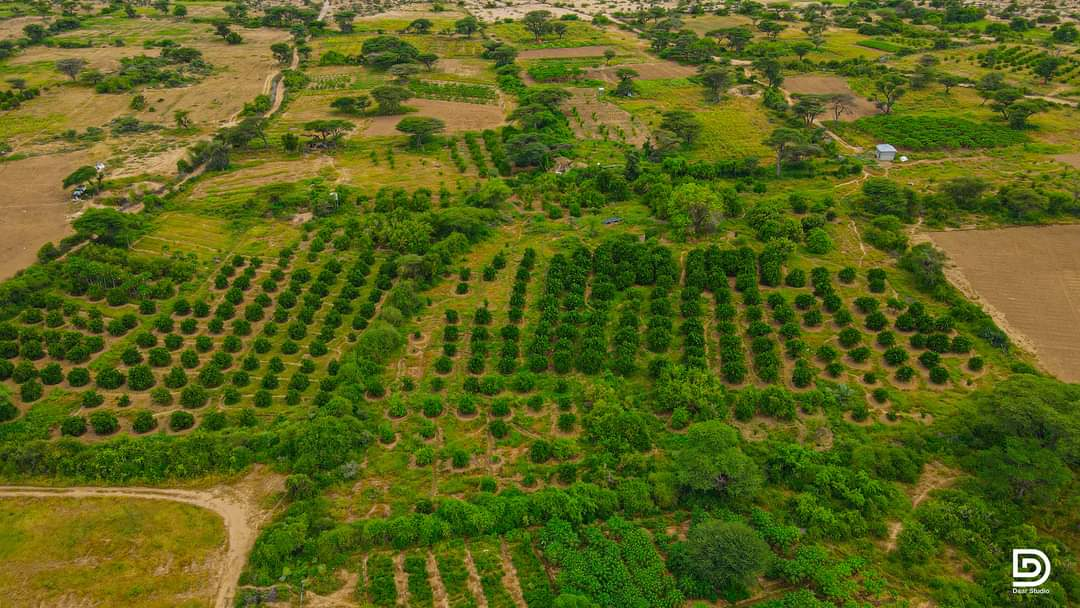
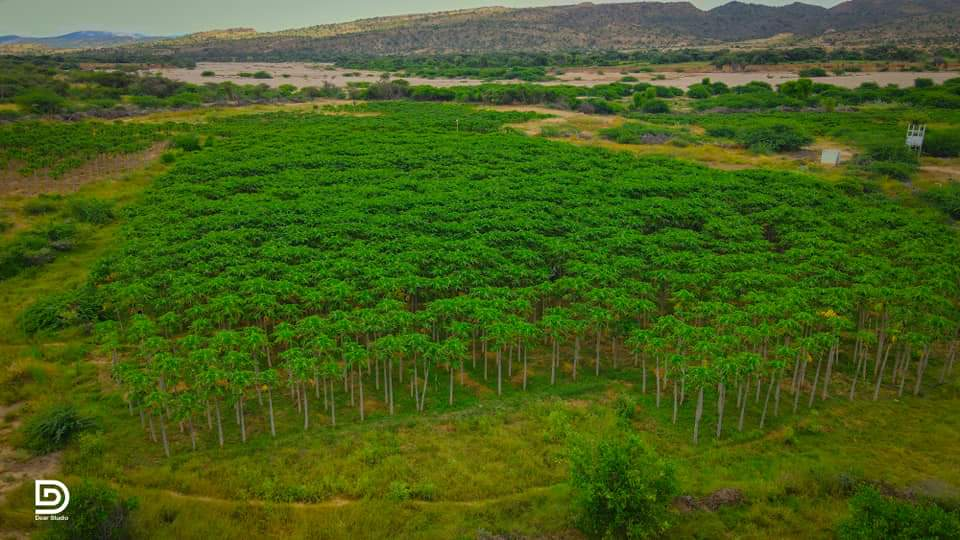
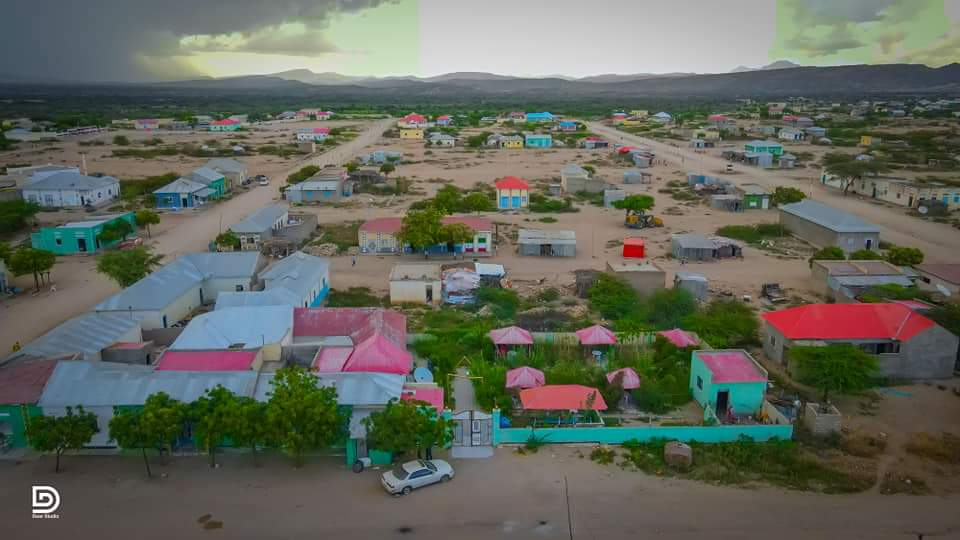

- Location in Somaliland. Baki (Somaliland)
- Coordinates: 10.006939°N 43.363006°E
- Country: Somaliland
- Region: Awdal
- District: Baki District

Area
  - Total: 3,420 km^{2} (1,320 sq mi)

Population (2024)
  - Total: 927,897
  - Density: 43.48/km^{2} (112.6/sq mi)
- Time zone: UTC+3 (EAT)
- Climate: BSh

Baki is a town in the northwestern Awdal region of Somaliland. It is the capital of the Baki district.

== Demographics ==
Baki is inhabited by the Reer Nuur branch of the Makahiil and Reer Mohamed branch of the Mahad 'Ase subclans of the Gadabuursi Dir clan.

Historically, the inhabitants of Baki have been known for their traditional livelihoods, which include pastoralism, small-scale agriculture, and mineral extraction. The local population is composed of agro-pastoralist communities who engage in livestock herding, farming, and limited mining activities, reflecting a mixed economic lifestyle that has been sustained over generations.

== See also ==
- Administrative divisions of Somaliland
- Regions of Somaliland
- Districts of Somaliland
