= Hingalol District =

Hingalol Degmada Xingalool
- District
- Country: Somaliland
- Region: Badhan
- Capital: Hingalol
- Time zone: UTC+3 (EAT)

Hingalol District is a district in the eastern Sanaag region of Somaliland.

== See also ==
- Administrative divisions of Somaliland
- Regions of Somaliland
- Districts of Somaliland
