= Fiqi Aadan =

- Town
- Location in Somaliland Fiqi Aadan (Somaliland)
- Coordinates: 10°36′59″N 43°19′22″E
- Country: Somaliland
- Region: Awdal
- Time zone: UTC+3 (EAT)

Fiqi Aadan is a town in the northwestern Awdal region of Somaliland. It is roughly 65 km northwest of Borama. The town is located near the mountainous and fertile Libaaxley region. The area is mainly used as a grazing point for nomads from the surrounding towns and villages.

== Demographics ==
The region around the town is inhabited by the Reer Mohamuud and Abdille subclans of the Bahabar 'Eli, branch of the Mahad 'Ase, a subclan of the Gadabuursi Dir clan.

== See also ==
- Administrative divisions of Somaliland
- Regions of Somaliland
- Districts of Somaliland
