= Boon, Awdal =

Town in Awdal, Somaliland

Boon Bonn
- Town
- Location within Awdal Location within Somaliland
- Coordinates: 10°11′39″N 43°05′20″E
- Country: Somaliland
- Region: Awdal
- Time zone: UTC+3 (EAT)

Boon pronounced as Bonn (also spelled: Bown or Bawn) is a town in the northwestern Awdal region of Somaliland.

== Overview ==
Boon is situated about 50 km to the northwest of Borama.

== Geography ==
Situated in the mountainous western regions of Somaliland. The area hosts the famous Libahleh Mountains which spans this region and the Zeila District to the west.

== Demographics ==
The town is mainly inhabited by the Reer Ahamed subclan of the Jibriil Yoonis and the Reer Mohamuud subclan of the Bahabar 'Eli, Mahad 'Ase, both branches of the Gadabuursi Dir clan. There is also a presence of other Jibriil Yoonis subclans and the Hebjire, Musafin and Hasan Sa'd subclans of the Habar 'Affan, all branches of the Gadabuursi subclan of the Dir clan family.

== See also ==
- Abasa
