= Harirad =

Harirad Xariirad
- Town
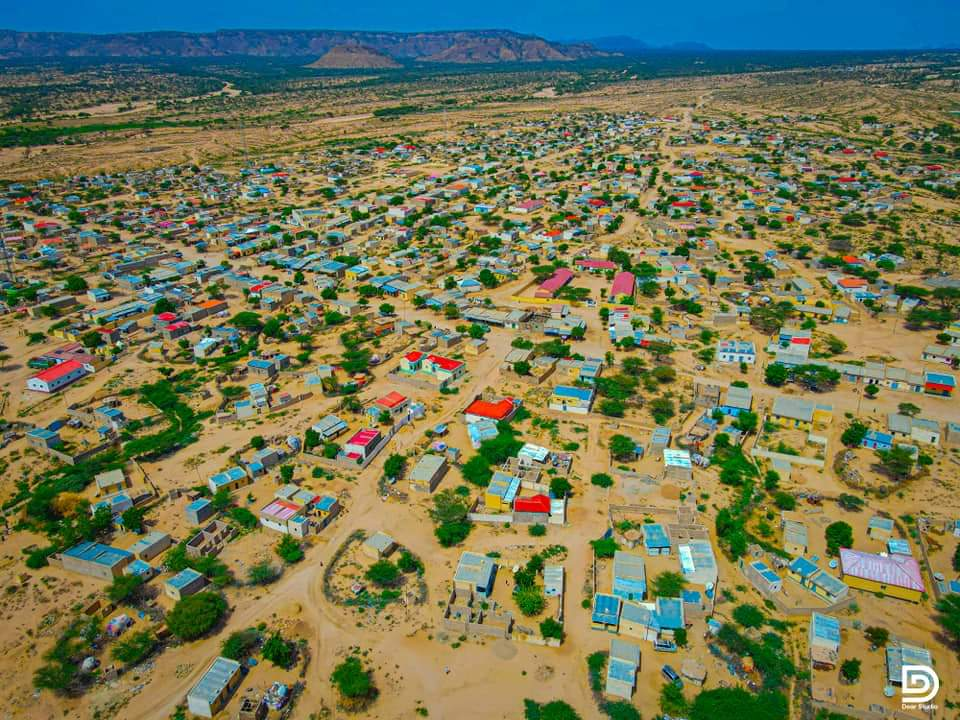

- Location in Somaliland. Harirad (Somaliland)
- Coordinates: 10°27′00″N 42°50′00″E
- Country: Somaliland
- Region: Awdal
- District: Zeila
- Time zone: UTC+3 (EAT)

Harirad (Somali: Xariirad) is a town in the northwestern Awdal region of Somaliland. It is about 87 km northwest of Borama and 3 km (2 mi) north of the border with Ethiopia. With an elevation of 972 meters above sea level, the settlement sprawls on a wide basin surrounded by granite mountains on all sides.

== History ==
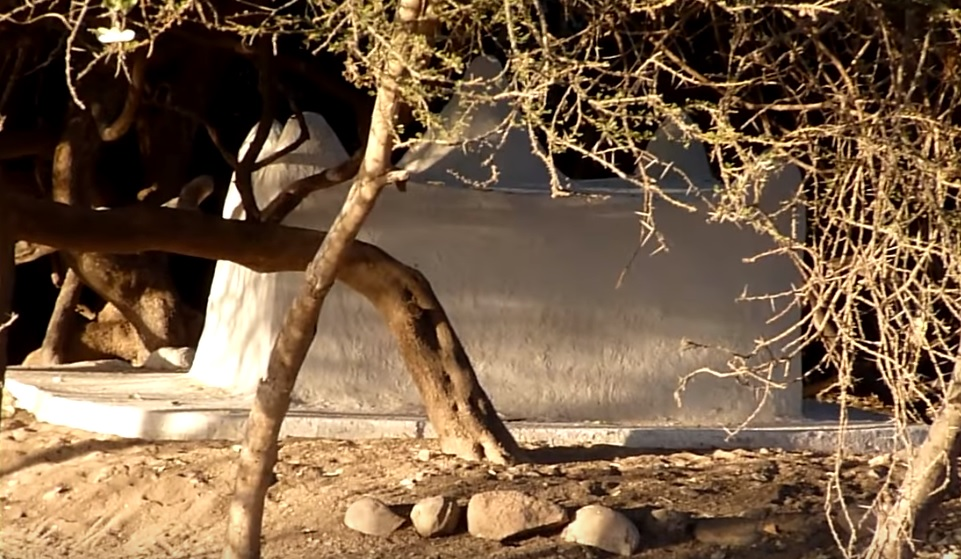
The tomb of Ugaas Samatar in Harirad (died: 1812), Ugaas of the Gadabuursi clan.

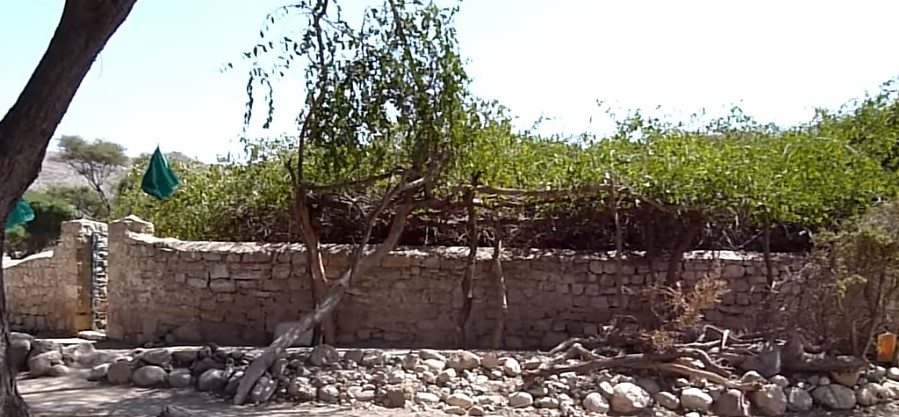
The tomb of Dudub Osman, ancestor of the Reer Dudub (Jibriil Yoonis), Gadabuursi in Harirad.

According to legend, the present-day territory of Harirad was covered by trees and a wadi. On their way to Zeila, nomadic pastoralists sometimes stopped in the town to water their flock. The town houses the burial sites for many of the historical figures of the town, among them Ughaz Samatar (died: 1812), of the Reer Ugaas subclan of the Makayl-Dheere, who was the chief of the Gadabuursi clan. Also, buried in the town is Dudub Osman, who is the ancestor of the Reer Dudub branch of the Jibriil Yoonis subclan of the Gadabuursi.

== Demographics ==
The town of Harirad is mainly inhabited by the Reer Dudub subclan of the Jibriil Yoonis and the Bahabar 'Eli subclan of the Mahad 'Ase, both branches of the Gadabuursi Dir clan. The Reer Geedi subclan of the Issa Dir clan mainly graze in the rural countryside of Harirad.

The FSAU Monthly Food Security Report March (2003) states that the Gadabuursi clan are the main local inhabitants of Harirad whilst Issa pastoralists migrate to the region seasonally from Ethiopia:

"Following discussions with the Issa (from Ethiopia) and Gadabursi (local inhabitants) livestock owners and local leaders in Gerissa, Xariradd, Jidhi, Karuure, Ceel Gal, Zeyla, Lughaye, Kalalwe and Osooli."

== Geography ==
Harirad is situated in a mountainous area, in an enclosed valley of the highlands. One can also take in the local wildlife, such as the black-backed jackal, dorcas gazelle, caracal, hamadryas baboon and various bird species.

== Climate ==
The weather in Harirad is semi-arid (Köppen climate classification: BSk). It has a mountain climate, with hot and dry summers and cold winters. This is attributed to the fact that Harirad is located on a plain surrounded by mountains as well as near the sea. The town sits at an altitude of 972 meters above sea level, in low-shrouded mountains and hills.

Climate data for Harirad
Month	Jan	Feb	Mar	Apr	May	Jun	Jul	Aug	Sep	Oct	Nov	Dec	Year
Mean daily maximum °C (°F)	26.8 (80.2)	27.2 (81.0)	29.4 (84.9)	30.6 (87.1)	32.9 (91.2)	34.7 (94.5)	34.0 (93.2)	33.4 (92.1)	32.8 (91.0)	30.7 (87.3)	28.5 (83.3)	26.8 (80.2)	30.7 (87.2)
Daily mean °C (°F)	20.5 (68.9)	21.5 (70.7)	23.6 (74.5)	25.2 (77.4)	27.3 (81.1)	29.1 (84.4)	28.3 (82.9)	27.7 (81.9)	27.5 (81.5)	24.6 (76.3)	22.2 (72.0)	20.6 (69.1)	24.8 (76.7)
Mean daily minimum °C (°F)	14.2 (57.6)	15.9 (60.6)	17.9 (64.2)	19.9 (67.8)	21.7 (71.1)	23.6 (74.5)	22.6 (72.7)	22.1 (71.8)	22.3 (72.1)	18.5 (65.3)	15.9 (60.6)	14.5 (58.1)	19.1 (66.4)
Average precipitation mm (inches)	9 (0.4)	15 (0.6)	26 (1.0)	51 (2.0)	31 (1.2)	15 (0.6)	49 (1.9)	71 (2.8)	50 (2.0)	12 (0.5)	9 (0.4)	3 (0.1)	341 (13.5)
Source: Climate Data
