= Sheikh Abibakar Sheikh Omer =

Somali Politician

Sheikh Abibakar Sheikh Omer was a Somali politician from Borama. He served as a member of the first parliament of Somaliland in 1960.

== Political career ==
In the February 1960 legislative elections in British Somaliland, Omer ran as a candidate for the United Somali Party (USP) to represent the Borama District constituency. He won the election to become one of the 33 original members of the newly independent state's legislative assembly. Following independence on June 26, 1960, he and his fellow parliamentarians subsequently participated in the unification processes that formed the Somali Republic on July 1, 1960.

== Gallery ==
Group photo of early Somali members of parliament, with Sheikh Abibakar Sheikh Omer fourth from the right in the front row.
