= Roble =

Roble may refer to:

- Roble Hall, residence hall at Stanford University
- Jawahir Roble, Somali-born British football referee
- Roble Afdeb, a famous Somali legendary poet and warrior.

== Plants ==
Roble is a Spanish common name for oaks. Species known as roble in English include:

- Quercus lobata, tree native to California
- Lophozonia obliqua, tree native to South America and cultivated in the British Isles
