= Ali Bu'ul =

19th century Somali poet and military leader

Sultan Ali Bu'ul Cali Bucul
- Born: Awdal, Somaliland
- Occupations: Poet, military leader and Sultan
- Children: Sultan Omar (Suldaan Cumar)

Ali Bu'ul (Somali: Cali Bucul), was a famous Somali poet, military leader and sultan from the 19th century originating from Somaliland and Djibouti. He is renowned for his short lined poems who were in vogue before the early 20th century. Many of his poems are still known today

== History ==
Ali is originally from the Aden Yonis section of the Makahil Samaron (Gadabursi). A renowned 19th century poet among the ranks of Adan Gurey and Mahamed Abdille Hassan (Sayidka), Ali Bu'ul has produced numerous poems that still to this day are read and presented at gatherings. He was born in the district of Awdal, Somaliland.

He opposed the Abyssinians from taxing the Somali inhabitant in the area currently known as the Somali region of Ethiopia. He was celebrated for his geeraar (a Somali term indicating a shorter version of poetry, shorter lines compared to conventional poetry or gabay). Geeraars are traditionally mostly recited during challenging times of war and battle. The Gadabursi were known for praising their horses in their geeraar and echoing their name. Ali Bu'ul as a military leader he met the Sayyid or Mahamed Abdullah Hassan somewhere within the current borders the Somali region of Ethiopia. The Sayid was amazed to hear that the Gadabursi are known for praising their horses in their geeraar and echoing the horses in their names. The religious leaders Mahamed Abdullah decided to hear for himself and challenged Ali Bu'ul. They slinged insults and threats at each other. It was then that the famous poem Amaan Faras was recited by Ali Bu'ul while riding his horse, which till this day is taught in Somali schools and is widely known among the Somali people.

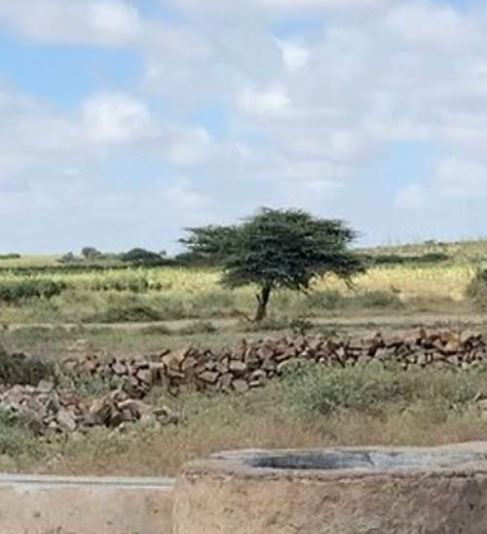
The tree under which Sultan Omar Ali' Bu'ul was crowned and his inauguration was celebrated. It is located in the area called Shibiqo in the vicinity of Sheddher.

The poem is titled Amaan Faras which translated to In Praise of My Horse:

Gamaan Waa Magic Guudoo, Sanga aan Gabanayniyo
Magaankii Godanaa iyo, Geenyadii Dhadigayd baa,
Gabigood ka Dhaxaysoo, Haybta way isku Gartaane,
Guulwadaw Faraskaygu, Hadii aan Galadiisiyo,
Gedahiisa Tilmaamo, Waa Gal Maaxanayoo,
Gaadhi Mayno Xogtiisoo, Waan ka Gaab-Sanayaaye,
Rag allow Gaf Miyaa ?? Almis Goodiyadeediyo
Bulaxaar Guduunkeediyo, Golihii Harawaad iyo
Gureys Reeraha Yaala, Galab Buu isku MaraayeMa Daruur Gudgudaa ??
Gabangoodi Abaaroo, Dadku Guunyo ka Quustay
Geel Buu soo Tu’iyaaye, Ma Gob reera Dhacdaa
Goluhuu Miranaayay, Gurxan Dhowrta Fogeeyiyo
Gooh Wayn Baa ka Baxayee, Ma Aar Goosn Wataa ??
Golihii ku Xidhnaa, Nacab soo Gardaraystiyo
Gaas Laxaadliyo Guutiyo, Guluf Weerar ku Qaadiyo
Gaado Goonya Wareegiyo, Guhaad Buu ku Xijaaboo
Rugtiisa Ma Gaydoo, Aad baa loogu Gamaaye
Ma Ganuun Nin Dhamaa ?? Gudcur Roob Gibil Saarayoo
Gufaacadiisiyo Caydhka, Naftaydii Gilgilaysa
Tuuga soo Gabanaaya, Laydhiisuu ka Gartaaye
Ma guhaan Garab daar loo, Faalka Guun ku Noqdaa ??
Hal’garaadka Guntiisiyo, Guudka buu ka Cadaadee
Ma Galool Ubaxlaa ?? Fanku suu u Dhitoobay
Ma aroos Dhumuc Waynoo, Duleedkuun Dhacandiidoo
Dhiinle Loo Alyayaa ?? Tagoogaa Dhanbacaada
Ma Libaax Dhalanteedoo, Cad Geel Dhuunyanayaa
Dhasalaalaq Ciyaarka, Ma dhalaan Rugtii Joogaa
Soo Dhaandhaansada Uurkoo, Dhibic Roob Helaybaa ?
Sayntiisuu ka Cisiine, Ma Sayruuq la Ganaa
Afartiisa Cagood iyo, Cududaa Dib u Laabiga
Ma Camoodiga Haadoo, Samadaa ku Carceerayoo
Meel casaanle Arkaayo, Hoos U Caaridayaa ?
Halka Lowgiyo Laabtiyo, Ladanow Badhi Dhawrkiyo
Leemaaduhu iska Galeenbaa, Ladnaan Loogu Gamaaye
Ma Aroos Ladan Baa ? Helmiyay oo Helmiyay oo helmiyay
Oo ammaantiisii Heli Waayee, Hoosiisow Midabkaagu
Ma Habeynkiyo Waagoo

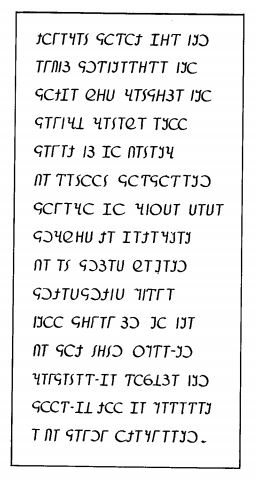
A fragment of the poem Amaan Faras composed by Ali Bu'ul in the Gadabuursi script.

Here is where he coined the term '"Guulwade", which Somalis still use up to this day and especially during Somalia's revolutionary council years A fraction of the poem illustrated in the Gadabursi script translated as:

From the seaside of Bulahar
to the corner of the Almis mountain
and Harawe of the pools
Hargeisa of the Gob trees
My horse reaches all that in one afternoon
Is it not like a scuddling cloud?
From its pen
A huge roar is heard
Is it not like a lion leading a pride?
In the open plains
It makes the camels kneel down
Is it not like an expert camel-rustler?
Its mane and tail has white tufts on the top
Is it not as beautiful as a galool tree abloom?

Another famous poem by Ali Bu'ul is Guulside, which translates to Victory-Bearer, here is an extract from the poem:

Guulsidow faraskayga.
Hadii aan gallaaddsiisiyo.
Gedihiisa tilmaamo.
Waa gal maxaanaya oo.
Gaadhimayno xogtiisa oo.
Waan ka gaabsanayaaye.
Rag allow gef miyaa?.
Almis gooddiyadeediyo.
Galihii harawaadiyo.
Gureys beelaha yaalla.
Galab buu isku maraaye.
Ma daruud gudgudaa?
Gabangoobi abaar ah oo.
Dadku guunyo ka quustay.
Geel bu soo tu'iyaayee.
Ma gob reera dhacdaa?
Galuhuu miranaayo.
Gurxan dhawrta fogeeyiyo.

this particular poem alliterates echoing the horse's name.
