= Haji Ibrahim Nur =

Somali politician, minister and merchant

Haji Ibrahim Nur حجي ابراهيم نور
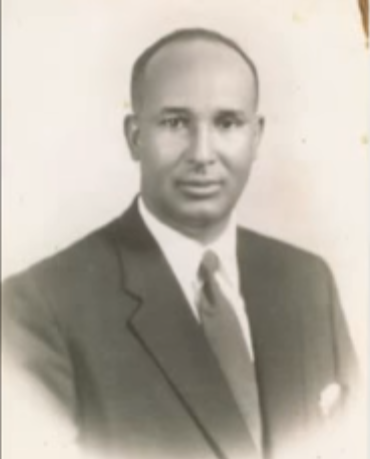

Personal details
- Born: Borama, British Somaliland (Somaliland)
- Party: USP, United Somali Party
- Profession: Politician, minister and merchant

Haji Ibrahim Nur or Hon. Haji Ibrahim Nur (Somali: Xaaji Ibraahim Nuur, Arabic: حجي ابراهيم نور) was a Somali politician, minister and merchant. He was the part of the British Somaliland Protectorate cabinet before the formation and unification of the Somali republic. He was born in Borama in the Awdal region of Somaliland.

== History ==
Haji Ibrahim Nur was born in Borama. He was one of the 4 officials who added their signatories along with Mohamed Ibrahim Egal, Garad Ali Garad Jama and Ahmed Haji Dualeh (Keyse) for the unification of the former British Somaliland and Italian Somaliland (Somalia Italiana). He was among the wealthiest merchants in the former British protectorate.
