= Lughaya =

- Town
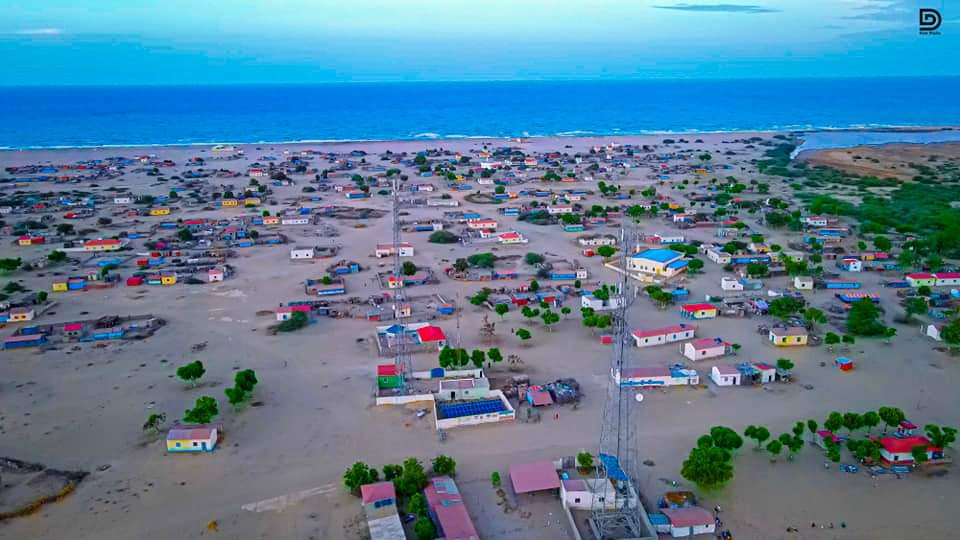

- Location in Somaliland Lughaya (Somaliland)
- Coordinates: 10°43′07″N 43°56′11″E
- Country: Somaliland
- Region: Awdal
- District: Lughaya District

Government
  - Mayor: Abdullahi Ali Aw Nuur

Population (2024)
  - Total: 75,000
- 2024
- Time zone: UTC+3 (EAT)
- Climate: BWh

Lughaya (Arabic: لوغهيا) is a coastal town in the northwestern Awdal region of Somaliland.

== Demographics ==
The broader Lughaya District has a total population of 101,104 residents. The town is mainly inhabited by the Mahad 'Ase subclan of the Gadabuursi Dir clan who make up the predominant clan in the district, dominating local government representation and having always occupied the seat of the mayor.

Malte Sommerlatte (2000) states:

"In the centre of the study area are the Gadabursi, who extend from the coastal plains around Lughaye, through the Baki and Borama districts into the Ethiopian highlands west of Jijiga."

In the Ruin and Renewal: The story of Somaliland (2004), the author states:

"So too is the boundary of Lughaya district whose predominant (if not exclusive) inhabitants are today Gadabursi."

The FSAU Monthly Food Security Report March (2003) states that the Gadabuursi clan are the main local inhabitants of the Lughaya District whilst Issa pastoralists migrate to the region seasonally from Ethiopia:

"Following discussions with the Issa (from Ethiopia) and Gadabursi (local inhabitants) livestock owners and local leaders in Gerissa, Jidhi, Karuure, Ceel Gal, Kalalwe and Osooli."

There is also a sizeable minority of the Issa subclan of the Dir who mainly inhabit the Zeila District.
