= Lughaya District =

Lughaya District Degmada Lughaya
- District
- Lughaya district within Awdal, Somaliland

- Location within Somaliland
- Country: Somaliland
- Region: Awdal
- Capital: Lughaya

Government
  - Mayor: Abdullahi Ali Aw Nuur

Area
  - Total: 10,421 km^{2} (4,024 sq mi)

Population (2024)
  - Total: 182,706
- Time zone: UTC+3 (EAT)

Lughaya District (Somali: Degmada Lughaya) is a district of the Awdal region in Somaliland. As of 2005, the Lughaya District had an estimated population of 36,104 residents.

As of 2007, Lughaya District's administrative division in Somaliland is C. (A being the highest and D being the lowest.)

Although it is an old port town, no large port is suitable for overseas trade.

== Demographics ==
The broader Lughaya District has a total population of 100,104 residents. The district is mainly inhabited by the Mahad 'Ase subclan of the Gadabuursi Dir clan who make up the predominant clan of the district, dominating local government representation and having always occupied the seat of the mayor.

Malte Sommerlatte (2000) states:

"In the centre of the study area are the Gadabursi, who extend from the coastal plains around Lughaye, through the Baki and Borama districts into the Ethiopian highlands west of Jijiga."

In the Ruin and Renewal: The story of Somaliland (2004), the author states:

"So too is the boundary of Lughaya district whose predominant (if not exclusive) inhabitants are today Gadabursi."

The FSAU Monthly Food Security Report March (2003) states that the Gadabuursi clan are the main local inhabitants of the Lughaya District whilst Issa pastoralists migrate to the region seasonally from Ethiopia:

"Following discussions with the Issa (from Ethiopia) and Gadabursi (local inhabitants) livestock owners and local leaders in Gerissa, Xariradd, Jidhi, Karuure, Ceel Gal, Zeyla, Lughaye, Kalalwe and Osooli."

There is also a sizeable minority of the Issa subclan of the Dir who mainly inhabit the Zeila District.

== History ==
In 1885, Frank Linsly James describes Captain Stewart King's visit to the famous Eilo Mountain in the Gadabuursi country in the Lughaya District where the Gadabuursi natives informed him of the remains of ancient cities:

"The natives had told him that in the hill called Ailo about three days' march south-east from Zeila, there were remains of ancient cities, and substantially built houses... He hoped to be able to visit them. The whole country south-east of Zeila, inhabited by the Gadabursi tribe, had never yet been explored by a European. There was also in the hill Ailo a celebrated cave, which had been described to him as having a small entrance about three feet from the ground in the face of the limestone cliff. He had spoken to two or three men who had been inside it. They stated that they climbed up and entered with difficulty through the small opening; they then went down some steps and found themselves in an immense cave with a stream of water running through it, but pitch dark. A story was told of a Somali who once went into the cave and lost his way. In order to guide him out the people lighted fires outside, and he came out and told most extraordinary tales, stating that he found a race of men there who never left the cave, but had flocks and herds."

In 1886 the British General and Assistant Political Resident at Zeila, J. S. King, travelling by the coastal strip near Khor Kulangarit, near Laan Cawaale in the Lughaya District, passed by the famous tomb of 'Sharmarke of the White Shield', a famous Gadabuursi leader, poet, elder and grandfather of the current Sultan of the Bahabar Musa, Abshir Du'ale who was inaugurated in 2011 in the town of Lughaya:

"Shortly after passing the bed of the large river, called Barregid we halted for half an hour at a place where there were several large hollows like dried-up lakes, but I was informed that the rain-water does not remain in them any time. Close by, on a piece of rising ground, was a small cemetery enclosed by a circular fence of cut bushes. Most conspicuous among the graves was that of Sharmãrké, Gãshân 'Ada (Sharmãrké of the White Shield), a celebrated elder of the Bah Habr Músa section of the Gadabúrsi, who died about 20 years ago. The grave was surrounded by slabs of beautiful lithographic limestone brought from Eilo, and covered with sea shells brought from the coast, distant at least 10 miles."

In 1887, French poet and traveller, Arthur Rimbaud, visited the coastal plains of British Somaliland where he described the region between Zeila and Bulhar as part of the Gadabuursi country, with the clan centred around Sabawanaag in present day Lughaya District:

“Zeila, Berbera, and Bulhar remain in English hands, as well as the Bay of Samawanak, along the Gadiboursi coast, between Zeila and Bulhar, the place where the last French consular agent in Zeila, M. Henry, had planted the tricolor, the Gadiboursi tribe themselves having requested our protection, which is always enjoyed. All these stories of annexation or protection have been stirring up the minds along this coast these last two years.”

In 1937, there was a famous clan conflict between the Bahabar Musa and Abrain, both subclans of the Gadabuursi that took place in the Lughaya coastal plains all the way to Kabri Bahr.

According to a book published in England in 1951, the Mamasan and Yunis Musa branches of the Issa clan are using Lughaya as a home well. The Forlabbe branche of the Issa clan and the Yunis Nuh branche of the Habr Awal clan also use the land for grazing. However, the authors of the book state that comparatively little is known by the writer of the area.

In November 1989, a camp was established in Aysha, Ethiopia to receive refugees, mainly from the Issa clan, from Zeila and Lughaya.

In 2005, Egyptian fishing companies swarmed into Somaliland waters, fishing off Zeila, Lughaya, and Eil-Sheikh coasts.

In June 2009, Somaliland security forces banned trucks from heading to Bullo-caddo, citing the port between Lughaya and Zeila districts as being used for smuggling.

As of October 2009, a conflict between the Reer Nuur and Reer Hared clans was reported in the Gabiley District. Both sides are armed, and it is said that there are two routes by which weapons are smuggled into Somaliland: from Bosaso to eastern Somaliland and from between Zaila and Lughaya.

In September 2010, an estimated 250 armed men, believed to have been trained in Eritrea, invaded the western coast between Lughaya and Zeila. As of press time, Somaliland and Ethiopian forces were already jointly surrounding the group.

In May 2011, Hassan Ibrahim Kaain, deputy governor of the Lughaya district, accused the governor and elders of opposing the movement to block Somaliland independence, which is occurring in the Lughaya district.

In November 2012, a soldier accompanying a ballot box carrier opened fire on the assembled crowd, killing one person.

In February 2013, seven local councilors from Zeila and three from Lughaya resigned due to irregularities in the local council elections. All of these legislators are from the Issa clan community.

In January 2014, the ARDAA association in the Awdal region held a press conference at its office in Borama, calling on people to help construct the Lughaya port and other projects.

In August 2014, a meeting occurred between President Silanyo and the traditional chiefs of the Awdal region. The meeting was closed to the public, but tribal prejudice and cronyism in the Zaila and Lughaya districts were cited as one of the issues that needed to be resolved.

In January 2015, the Gadabuursi clan met in the Lughaya district and resolved, among other things, to encourage the construction of a port in the Lughaya district.

In February 2016, Mayor Abdillaahi Cali Aw Nuur Dixood arrested Suldaan Mawliid Cali Sabayse for allegedly taking voter registration cards.

Reports from 2016 suggest that immigration facilities are also located in Hees, Shalaaw, Eil Daraad, Lughaya, Bulahaar, and Zeila on the Somaliland coast but are run by clan-selected control officers and are not under the complete control of the Somaliland government.

In August 2016, the Somaliland Ministry of Interior stated that the jurisdiction of voting in the Lughaya district would be under the jurisdiction of Hargeisa instead of the Awdal region. In response, disputes arose in six locations in the Lughaya district, and registration for voting was suspended.

In August 2017, several vessels carrying illegal migrants came and went between Somaliland and Yemen. The ports of Berbera and Lughaya were used on the Somaliland side, and Al Hudaydah and Mokha were used on the Yemeni side.

In August 2020, the Somaliland Defense Minister was attacked by armed groups in Abdi Gedi, Lughaya district.

In October 2023, the Gadabuursi and Issa clans of Lughaya district were reconciled.

On January 1, 2024, Ethiopia and Somaliland exchanged a memorandum that lent 20 km of Somaliland's coast to Ethiopia. The Ethiopian Prime Minister did not reveal the memo's details but did mention the use of the port of Berbera and the possibility of Lughaya. A demonstration against this was held in Lughaya.

On February 7, 2024, the Bahabar Musa of the Gadabuursi held a clan conference named Talo Wadaag in Ido Cadays, Lughaya district. The conference lasted for almost the entire month to discuss current affairs regarding the MoU, future development, clan unity, security, the clan, and its areas. The Bahabar Muuse addressed concerns about Lughaya and consensually agreed to reject the MoU with Ethiopia, vowing to defend the land against any provocation.

== Natural Disasters and Relief ==
In January 2008, rain and cold weather killed more than 7,000 sheep in the coastal areas of Lughaya and Zeila District.

In September 2011, a drought occurred in the Lughaya district, and 300 families were evacuated to Gargaara village in the northern Awdal region.

In June 2012, drought and water shortages occurred in coastal areas such as Zaila, Lughaya, and Bulhar.

In January 2014, locust damage was widespread in northwestern Somaliland from Bulhar, Lughaya, to Zaila.

In Lughaya district, the drought at the end of 2015 and the beginning of 2016 resulted in high malnutrition rates.

In January 2018, a state of emergency was declared in Lughaya district due to drought.

Flooding was caused by Cyclone Sagar in the Lughaya district in May 2018. Together with the neighboring Baki District, 15 people died. In March 2019, the Somaliland government donated 2,400 head of livestock to victims in the Lughaya district.

In November 2020, locusts hit the Lughaya district but was supported by a project funded by the Somali Development Fund.

== See also ==
- Administrative divisions of Somaliland
- Regions of Somaliland
- Districts of Somaliland
