= Roble Afdeb =

Somali warrior and poet

- ربلي افديب
- Born: Awdal, Somaliland
- Occupations: Poet and warrior

Roble Afdeb (Somali: Rooble Afdeeb) was a Somali warrior and poet from northwestern Somalia (Somaliland).

== History ==
He was originally from the Jibriil yoonis sub-clan of the Makahil Samaron (Gadabursi). He was known and named "The great slayer of the Issas or great Issa slayer''. The Issa are a tribe adjecant to the Gadabuursi and also derive themselves from Dir, more precisely the Madobe Dir section. Though quite similar to each other, the Gadabursi and Issa fought multiple wars. Roble Afdeb was thus a warrior who pillaged and raided many Issa settlements and there are many poems written by him about his rival clan, the Issa. He lived at the end of the 19th century.

His name is a reflection according to scholars of the Somali af ku leeble which means shooting an arrow to the mouth.

Roble Afdeb surprisingly has become a legend not for being anti-colonial or participating in a religious struggle or religious commitment, rather it's clan rivalry that has made him gain a legendary status.

A famous poem composed by Roble Afdeb goes:

"Quduraa i qabsatay oo ninkaan qoorta ka gooyay oo yaan qabrigii u regeeyey oo axankiisa cantuugay

Ciise waa sharaf jan oo waa shareeryo orgi waa shaydaan xadhigii shan ninkii ka dilana cadaabkuu ka shilmaa yoo jannadasuu juf yidhaa

Ciise waa cadowgii waa ciilkii kululaa markaad hoos u degtayna wuu idin heemin lahaa oo wuxuu kuugu hebday oo ku haweennimo qaatay waa hirka Yoonis Cismaan iyo

iihiihdayda iga baxaysa"

— Roble Afdeb

This illustrates the political situation in Somali lands and how clan rivalries runs in the culture.

=== Prisoner of war ===
One day the Issa raided a camp belonging to Roble Afdeb and his clan. Roble leading his clan set out to revenge his people. His men were defeated and he retreated with a broken leg only to be stuck in the middle of nowhere.

Roble was trapped in enemy territory, he lost his horse and was unable to travel great distances. To his distress Roble made up his mind and infiltrated an enemy camp at night to talk to their leader with the intention of giving himself up. Either help me or kill me and earn yourself a feather (earned when killing a rival clan member) he said. Their leader understanding of Roble's situation gave him a horse and food so he could return home.

Roble Afdeb intended to pay back his debt to Roble Awl. In doing so he launched a new attack and raid on the same camp after some time. This time his men and him managed to best the camp. A lot of confusion stirred through the camp and a boy tried to flee the rampage and onslaught.

Roble took it upon him to save the boy ans place him on his horse. At home he asked the boy about his background only to his amazement to find out that his name is Idleh Roble Awl, the son of Roble Awl. The man whose help Roble Afdeb sought during his times of distress and who had chosen to help him. Roble Afdeb took it upon him to raise the child as if he was his own.

When the boy Idleh reached the age of 20 Roble Afdeb gave him one of his own daughter in marriage. He also presented the newly wedded couple with animals in gifts and financial support so they could start their own family. The good news managed to reach Roble Awl the father of the boy he had many years ago decided to give up his search for him. Roble Awl was happy to know his son was still alive and well and that Roble Afdeb repaid his dues.

This act of nobility has to this day created a sort of alliance between the descendants of Roble Afdeb and that of Idle Roble Awl. They pay and receive blood compensation as a united group.
