= Reer Nuur =

Somali
Reer Nuur
- Somaliland DjiboutiEthiopia
- (Dir) Dir (including those of ancestral descent)

Regions with significant populations
- Somaliland, Djibouti, Ethiopia

Languages
- Somali, Arabic

Religion
- Islam

Related ethnic groups
- Other Gadabuursi clans, and Dir clans such as Barsuug, Biimaal, Gurgura, Surre, Issa

The Reer Nuur (Somali: Reer Nuur), also known as Nuur Yoonis, is a northern Somali clan, a sub-division of the Makahiil sub-clan of the Gadabuursi clan family.

== Overview ==
The Reer Nuur are one of the biggest sub-clans of the Gadabuursi clan family. Historically, they occupied the buffer zone between the Gadabuursi and Isaaq tribes. Historically, when the clan would meet for political affairs, the Reer Nuur would be counted as one separate branch, on equal standing with the Habar Afan, Mahad 'Ase , Aadan Yonis and the Jibril Yonis sub groups of the Gadabuursi family .

== Distribution ==
The Reer Nuur reside in 3 countries, Djibouti, Ethiopia, and Somaliland.

Within Somaliland, the Reer Nuur reside in the Awdal province, and share the Baki District with the Reer Mohammed (Mahad 'Ase) and Habar Afan, although Dilla District is dominated by them. They also inhabit the Borama District .

Within the Maroodi Jeex province, they reside in the Gabiley District, in towns such as Tog Wajaale, El Bardale, and Gabiley. Within the Hargeisa District, they reside in Hargeisa, in the Stadium and State Park neighborhoods.

Within Djibouti, the Reer Nuur reside in Quarter 4 and 5 of Djibouti (city).

Within Ethiopia, the Reer Nuur reside in the Somali Region, specifically in the Awbare district, the most demographically popular region of the Jigjiga Zone. The Reer Nuur historically have grazed up to Jijiga and make up the majority of the inhabitants of the city of Awbare.

== History ==
As a member of the Dir clan, the Reer Nuur come under the Makahiil branch of the Gadabuursi. As a member of the Dir clan, the Reer Nuur were a part of the Sultanate of Ifat and the Adal Sultanate. These sultanates were run by the Walashma dynasty, who were originated by the famous Yusuf bin Ahmad al-Kawneyn.

The Reer Nuur also occupy some of the oldest towns of these sultanates, the towns of Amud and Awbare. Which are also known as important historical sites and home to many Somali saints.

In the colonial age, the Reer Nuur were adamantly anti colonization, and refused to join the British (along with other Gadabuursi) against the Dervish movement.

The Balwo style of music and poetry was invented by a member of the Reer Nuur clan, known as Abdi Sinimo. His new style of music also led to the rise of the Heello genre and gave birth to modern Somali music.

== Clan Tree ==
The Reer Nuur claim descent from Dir through Gadabuursi, listed below.

- Gadabuursi
- Habar Makadur (Makadoor)
  - Makahil
    - Mussee
      - Yuunes (Reer Yoonis)
        - Nuur Yoonis (Reer Nuur)

The sub divisions of the Noor Yoonis:

- Noor Yoonis (Reer Nuur)
  - Reer Mahmuud
    - Abdi Mahamuud
      - Xuseen
        - Xaad (Buul-xun)
        - Shirdoon
        - Gabbal
          - Koohi (Bafaad)
          - Samatar (Bafaad)
            - Bahdoon Samatar
          - Ali
          - Raage
          - Xergeeye
          - Khayre (bah-caso)
          - Bahdoon (bah-caso)
          - Samatar-yare (bah-caso)
          - Dhaabur (bah-caso)
      - Cismaan (Reer – Cismaan)
    - Halas Mahmuud
      - Cumar Halas
        - Husien Omar
        - Farah Omar
        - Afi Omar
        - Gelleh Omar
        - Roble Omar
      - Guled Halas
        - Samatar Guled
        - Xildiid Guled(Xareed-Qoobbuur)
        - Dhidar Guled
      - Muse Halas
      - Hiraab Halas
      - Cali Halas
    - Hassan Mahmuud (Nimidoor)
    - Hufane Mahmuud (Nimidoor)
    - Roble Mahmuud (Ba-Jibra’en)
    - Mohamed Mahmuud (Ba-Jibra’en)
  - Reer Farah
    - Ibrahim Farah
      - Guled Ibraahim
        - Amare Guled
          - Xergeeye Amare
          - Faarah Amare
        - Shirwac Guled
          - Gaboobe Shirwac
          - Xirsi Shirwac
          - Samatar Shirwac
          - Geedi Shirwac
          - Geeldoon Shirwac
        - Abrar Guled
        - Rooble Guled
      - Gaade Ibraahim
        - Meecaad Gaade
        - Loodoon Gaade
        - Bahdoon Gaade
      - Bare Ibraahim
        - Gabdoon Bare
          - Meecaad Gabdoon (Gurey)
          - sareeye Gabdoon
          - Samatar Gabdoon (Qabile)
          - Magan Gabdoon
            - Waadhawr Magan (Reer wadheer)
            - Abdillahi Magan
            - Bahdoon Magan
      - Samakaab Ibraahim
      - Rooble Ibraahim
        - Samatar Rooble
      - Dadar Ibraahim
      - Salah Ibraahim (Dadar)
    - Geedi Farah also known as (Gabarmadow)
      - Wayteen Geedi
      - Cali Geedi
      - Mahamed Geedi
      - Dabeer Geedi
      - Hiraab Geedi
    - Reer Ali Abdi
