= Baki District =

Baki District Degmada Baki
- District
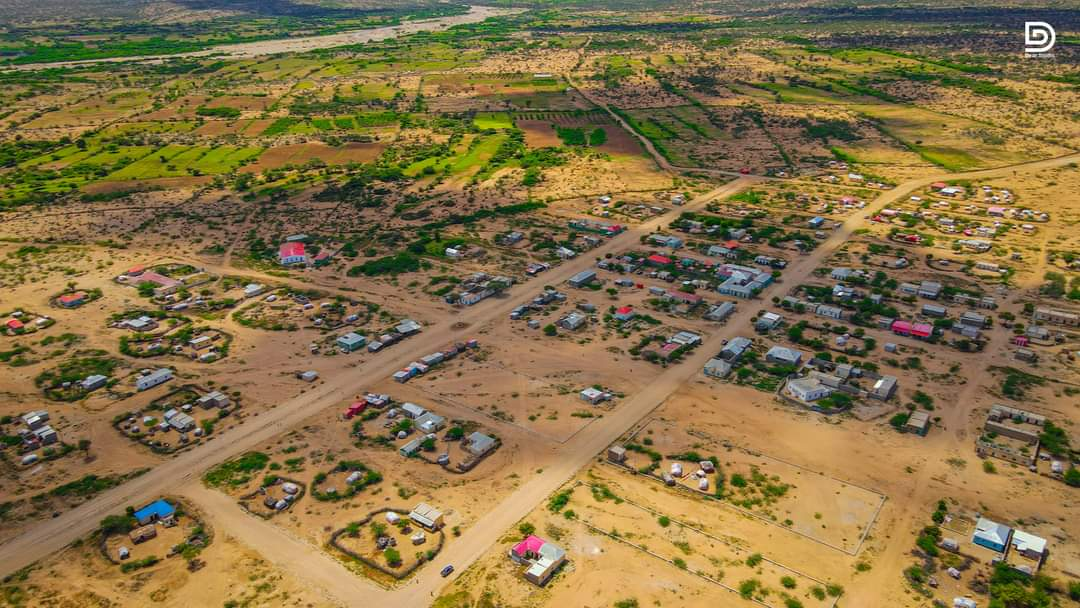

- Baki district within Awdal, Somaliland
- Coordinates: 10.28595°N 43.73256°E
- Country: Somaliland
- Region: Awdal
- Capital: Baki

Government
  - Type: Mayor
  - Mayor: Mohamed Ahmed Caateeye

Area
  - Total: 3,420 km^{2} (1,320 sq mi)

Population (2019)
  - Total: 685,702
  - Density: 43.48/km^{2} (112.6/sq mi)
- Time zone: UTC+3 (EAT)
- Area code: +252
- Estimated population and area figures based on local administrative reports

Baki District (Somali: Degmada Baki) is a district in the Awdal region of western Somaliland.

== Demographics ==
Baki is inhabited by the Reer Nuur branch of the Makahiil and Reer Mohamed branch of the Mahad 'Ase subclans of the Gadabuursi Dir clan.

== Mayor ==
The current mayor is Mohamed Ahmed Caateeye.

== Mining ==
The Simodi Mountains, located 48 km east of Baki village, have long been used as a mine. In the past, coltan and other materials were mined, and nowadays beryllium is mined and is called the Simodi Beryllium Mining Site.

Mining rights are complex.

The Somaliland government has granted mining rights to China's African Resources Corporation (ARC.) However, local clans have complained that profits are not being returned to the local community.

Somaliland government effectively controls Baki district, so the Federal Republic of Somalia has no real authority over it at all. However, there had been discussions between the Minister of Foreign Affairs of the Federal Republic of Somalia and the Chinese Ambassador over the rights to this mine.

The local clans are Reer Mohamed and Reer Nour. Both clans are branches of the Gadabuursi clan, but the mine is mainly owned by the Reer Mohamed clan, and there are concerns about conflicts with the disgruntled Reer Nour.

Local youth and foreign Diasporas have complained of pollution caused by beryllium mining. And it is said that foreign diaspora and Federal Republic of Somalia officials who oppose Somaliland's independence are overreaching on the issue.

== 2005 Somaliland parliamentary election ==
During the 2005 Somaliland parliamentary election, some confusion was reported in the Baki district.

A large number of voters gathered at the polling place, and in some places there were scuffles. Measures were taken to prevent multiple voting by applying fluorescent ink to the fingers of those who had already voted, but the checks were inadequate. The number of votes cast was unnaturally high considering the results of the 2003 vote. In addition, members of certain political parties were assisting at the polling stations. In some cases, the polls were not opened promptly after voting, and the Dila A polling station had a two-hour break after the polls closed to drink tea and chew khat.

== History ==
A 1996 study reported an unusually high incidence of Malaria in Baki and Borama, with some cases being severe.

In 1999, FAO initiated a project for the maintenance of pastures and grasslands in the Borama and Baki districts.

In 2002, a meeting was held between the mayors of Gabiley and Baki districts, to address their conflict, mediated by the Somaliland Ministry of Interior. At that meeting, the mayor of Baki appealed for humanitarian aid against epidemics and drought.

In 2003, activities to improve health and welfare were initiated in Baki and Borama districts in cooperation with the Somaliland Ministry of Health and the World Health Organization. Vaccination and measures to combat contaminated water were planned.

In December 2006, the deputy leader of the United Peoples' Democratic Party alleged that Governor Awdal was committing fraud in connection with the construction of a road connecting Baki and Borama, but Governor Awdal dismissed this claim.

In April 2009, fighting erupted over the boundary between the Gabiley and Baki districts.

In May 2013, the Somaliland Minister of Agriculture inspected the agricultural damage caused by floods and pests in Baki and Borama districts.

In October 2014, Somaliland's Minister of Minerals and Energy announced at a press conference that a mineral resources survey by China's African Resources Company (ARC) had led to complaints from local residents that environmental damage was occurring.

In December 2015, at a meeting in Borama, it was announced that the FAO had invested in 80 farmers in the Baki district.

In March 2016, a Chinese mining company built a four-class building for a middle school in Simodi, Baki district, that holds more than 100 students.

In August 2017, a car with the deputy mayor of Baki district was detained by Borama police; the deputy mayor was released but the car was sent to Hargeisa. Chiefs, elders, and experts from the Baki district gathered for a meeting on this issue.

In September 2017, a thunderstorm in Awdal region killed three people and injured two others in Baki district due to lightning strikes.

In November 2018, the Somaliland Minister of Agricultural Development visited the village of Ruqi in Baki district, which was damaged by cyclone, to lay the foundation stone for the reconstruction of the destroyed irrigation system. The work is funded by the Norwegian Refugee Council and supported by the British government and local farmers.

In August 2021, the Somaliland Board of Audit investigated allegations of abuse of power and corruption by the executive branch in Baki city and the illegal arrest of local elders.

In December 2021, a gold mine was found in the Baki district, and many people reportedly gathered at the mine in confusion after hearing rumors.

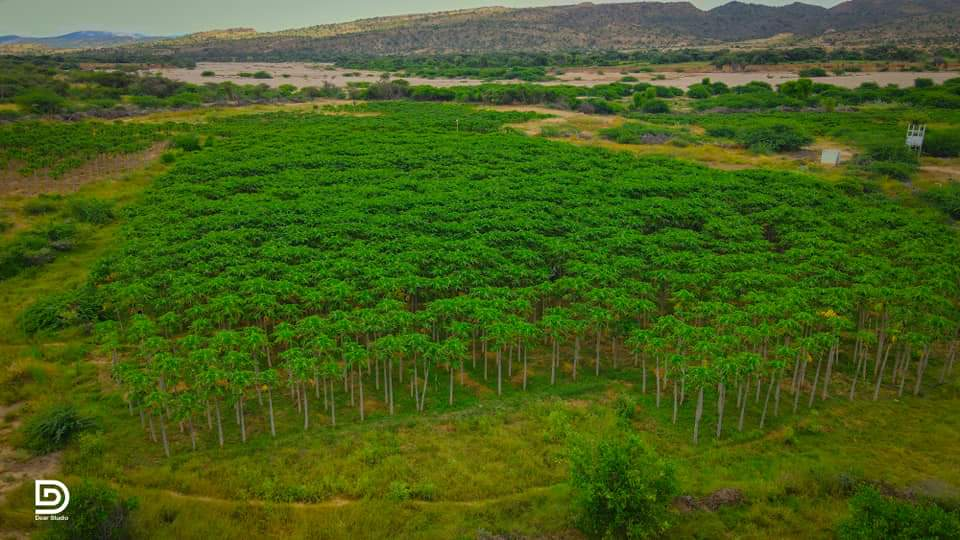
Baki_awdal1

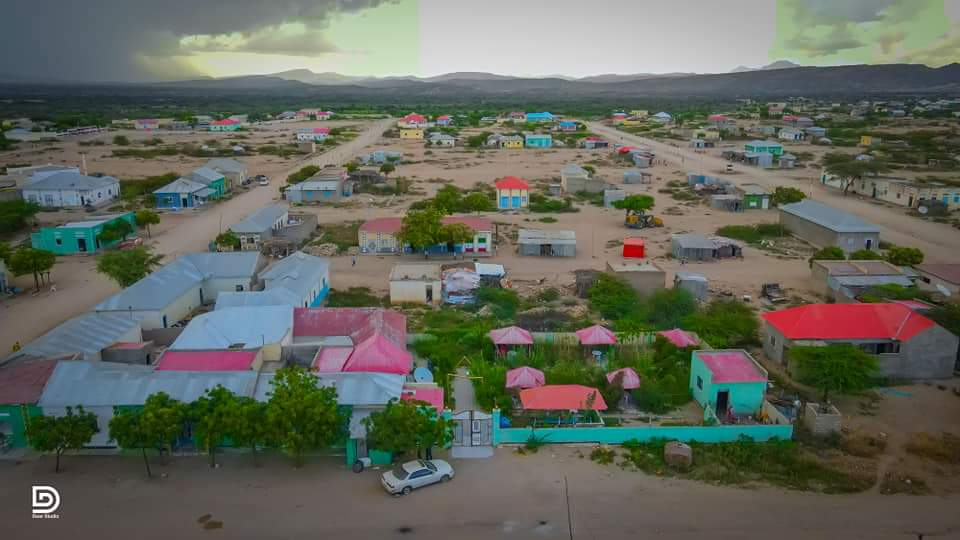
Baki_District2

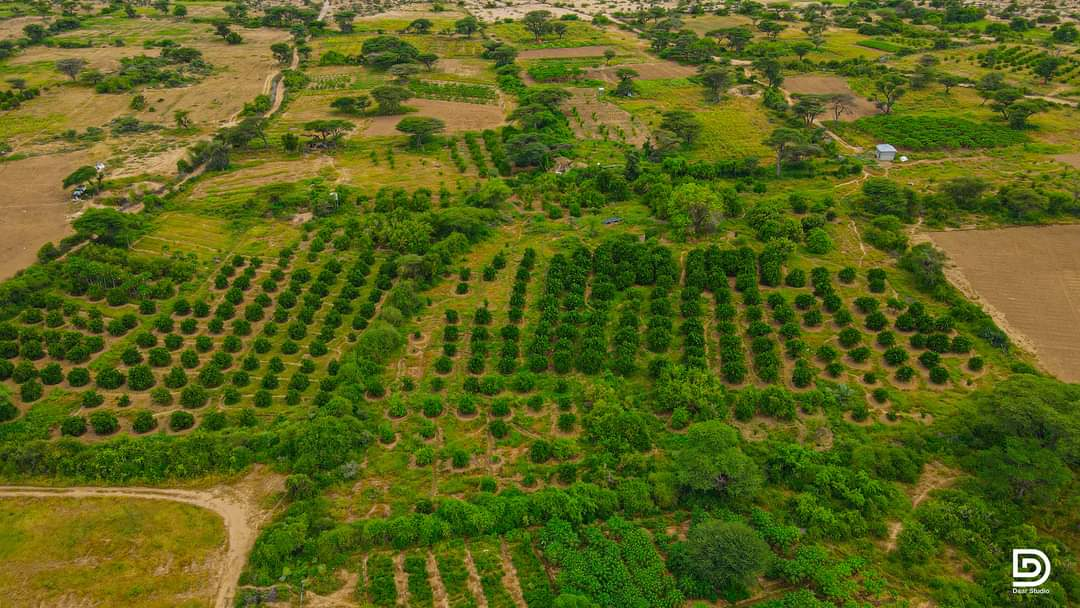
Baki_awdal_district

== See also ==
- Administrative divisions of Somaliland
- Regions of Somaliland
- Districts of Somaliland
