= Awdal =

Awdal Awdal (Somali) أودَل (Arabic)
- Region of Somaliland
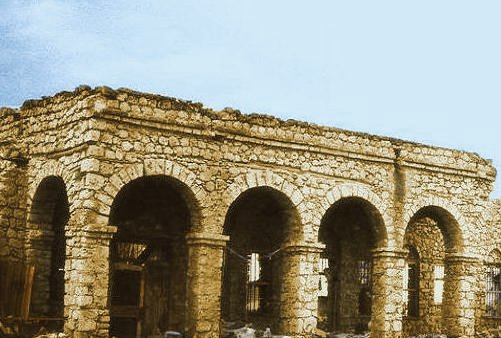
- Ruins of the Muslim Sultanate of Adal in Zeila
- Motto: Education, Peace and Prosperity.
- Location in Somaliland
- Coordinates: 10°48′3″N 43°21′7″E
- Country: Somaliland
- Established: June 1984
- Administrative centre: Borama

Government
  - Type: Regional
  - Governor: Muhumed Hassan Jama

Area
  - Total: 21,374 km^{2} (8,253 sq mi)
- Elevation: 2,136 m (7,008 ft)
- Highest elevation: 2,632 m (8,635 ft)
- Lowest elevation: 0 m (0 ft)

Population (2024, estimate)
  - Total: 636,108
  - Density: 30/km^{2} (78/sq mi)
- Time zone: UTC+3 (EAT)
- Area code: +252
- ISO 3166 code: SO-AW
- HDI (2021): 0.401 low · 3rd

Awdal (Somali: Awdal, Arabic: أودَل) is an administrative region (gobol) in western Somaliland. It was separated from Woqooyi Galbeed and became a province in 1984 and is the most northwesterly province of Somaliland. To the east it borders Maroodi Jeex and Sahil; to its north-west it borders Djibouti; to its south and south-west lies Ethiopia; and the Gulf of Aden is to its north. The province has an estimated population of 1,010,566. The region comprises the four districts of Borama, the regional capital, Baki, Lughaya, and Zeila.

== Description ==
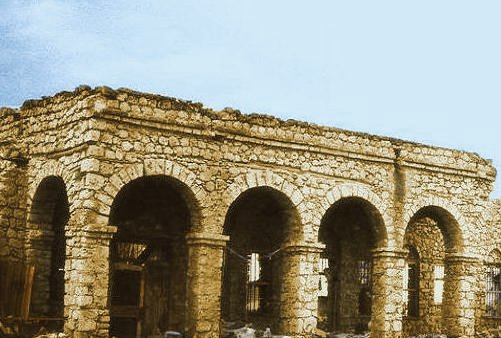
Ruins of the Adal Sultanate in Zeila, Somaliland.

Awdal (أودل) takes its name from the medieval Adal Sultanate (عَدَل), which was originally centered on Zeila. The area along the Ethiopian border is abundant with ruined cities, which were described by the British explorer Richard F. Burton. Geologically, much of the Awdal region is located in the Arabian Plate.

== Demographics ==
The Awdal Region is mainly inhabited by the Gadabuursi subclan of the Dir who are especially well represented and considered the predominant clan of the region.

Federico Battera (2005) states about the Awdal Region:

"Awdal is mainly inhabited by the Gadabuursi confederation of clans."

A UN report published by Canada: Immigration and Refugee Board of Canada (1999), states concerning Awdal:

"The Gadabuursi clan dominates Awdal region. As a result, regional politics in Awdal is almost synonymous with Gadabuursi internal clan affairs."

Roland Marchal (1997) states that numerically, the Gadabuursi are the predominant inhabitants of the Awdal Region:

"The Gadabuursi's numerical predominance in Awdal virtually ensures that Gadabuursi interests drive the politics of the region."

Marleen Renders and Ulf Terlinden (2010) both state that the Gadabuursi almost exclusively inhabit the Awdal Region:

"Awdal in western Somaliland is situated between Djibouti, Ethiopia, and the Issaq-populated mainland of Somaliland. It is primarily inhabited by the three sub-clans of the Gadabursi clan, whose traditional institutions survived the colonial period, Somali statehood and the war in good shape, remaining functionally intact and highly relevant to public security."

There is also a sizeable minority of the Issa subclan of the Dir who mainly inhabit the Zeila district.

== Climate ==
Climate data for Awdal
Month	Jan	Feb	Mar	Apr	May	Jun	Jul	Aug	Sep	Oct	Nov	Dec	Year
Mean daily maximum °C (°F)	29.0 (84.3)	30.0 (86.1)	31.1 (88.0)	32.2 (90.0)	34.0 (93.3)	36.0 (96.8)	36.8 (98.2)	36.3 (97.3)	34.8 (94.6)	32.4 (90.3)	30.7 (87.2)	29.4 (85.0)	32.7 (90.9)
Daily mean °C (°F)	23.3 (73.9)	24.5 (76.1)	25.9 (78.5)	27.3 (81.1)	28.9 (84.0)	30.7 (87.3)	31.4 (88.5)	30.9 (87.5)	29.7 (85.4)	26.6 (79.9)	24.6 (76.4)	23.4 (74.2)	27.3 (81.1)
Mean daily minimum °C (°F)	17.6 (63.6)	19.0 (66.2)	20.6 (69.2)	22.4 (72.3)	23.8 (74.9)	25.5 (77.8)	26.1 (78.9)	25.5 (77.8)	24.6 (76.3)	20.9 (69.7)	18.7 (65.6)	17.5 (63.5)	21.8 (71.3)
Average precipitation mm (inches)	6.5 (0.25)	7.9 (0.31)	23.5 (0.93)	40.7 (1.60)	35.4 (1.39)	12.4 (0.49)	31.4 (1.24)	51.7 (2.04)	43.5 (1.71)	17.7 (0.70)	10.9 (0.43)	6.5 (0.26)	288.0 (11.34)

== Districts ==
The Awdal region consists of four districts:

City, Town, Village in Sahil.
Ab=Abasa, Am=Amud, As=Asha-Addo, Ba=Baki, Bor=Borama, Boo=Boon, Ca=Cabdulqaadir, Di=Dilla, Fa=Farda Lagu-Xidh, Fi=Fiqi Aadan, Go=Goroyo Cawl, Ha=Harirad, Ja=Jarahorato, Ji=Jidhi, La=Lawyacado, Lu=Lughaya, Qu=Quljeed, Ru=Ruqi, We=Weeraar, Ze=Zeila

District	Grade	Capital	Comments	Location
Borama	A	Borama	Regional capital	
Zeila	B	Zeila		
Lughaya	C	Lughaya		
Baki	C	Baki		

== History ==
=== British Somaliland, Somalia ===
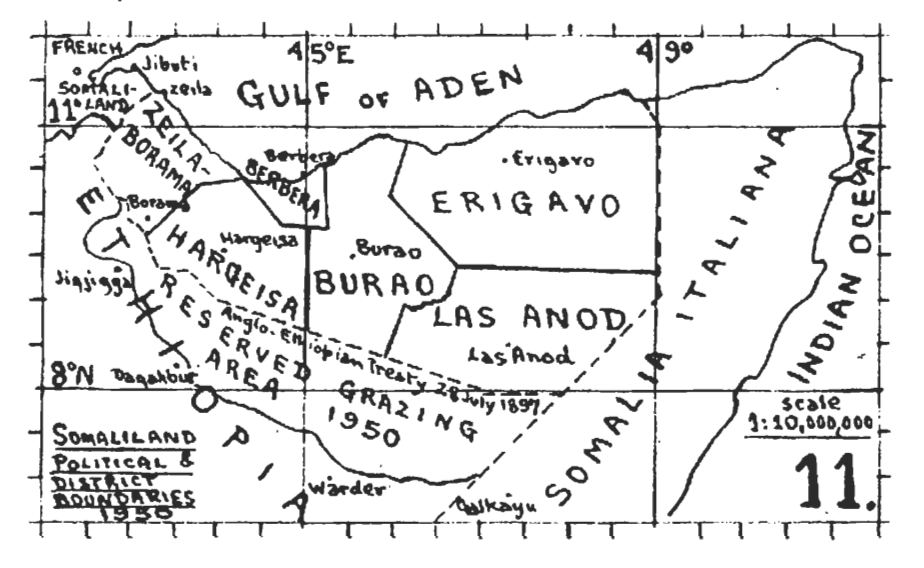
Administrative divisions of British Somaliland as described in a book published in the UK in 1951

In British Somaliland, today's Awdal was called Zeila-Borama district based on the region's main city.

In around 1964, the Berbera, Borama, and Hargeisa districts were combined to form the North-Western (Hargeisa) Province.

In 1984, the Somalia government established the Awdal region.

From the late 1980s, Somalia was in a state of civil war. In northwestern Somalia, the Somali National Movement (SNM), a political organization centered on the Isaaq clan, took up arms and waged an anti-government movement. At first, the Gadabuursi clan militia fought alongside the Somalia government against the SNM. However, the SNM fought back, and in January 1991 there were battles in Dilla, Awdal, with the SNM winning and advancing as far as Borama. However, afterwards, the Gadabuursi clan made peace with the SNM, and the SNM withdrew from Awdal at an early stage.

=== Re-independence of the Somaliland ===
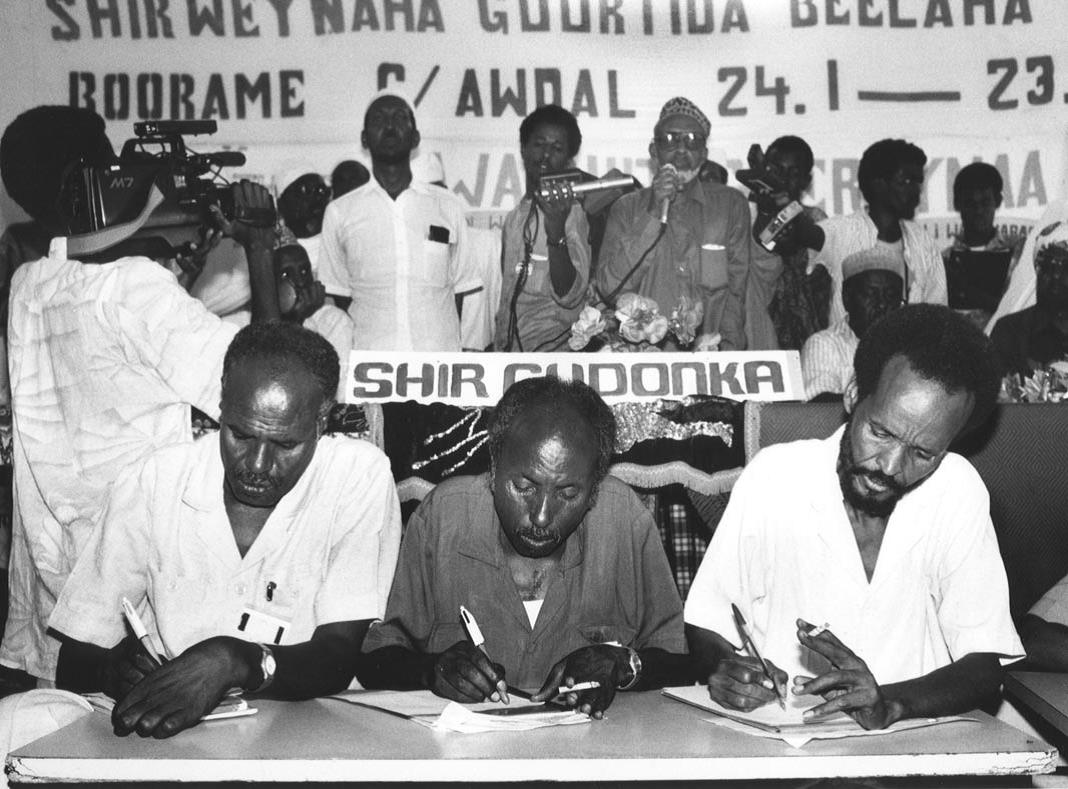
Borama Grand Conference

In May 1991, the SNM declared the re-independence of the State of Somaliland. The Gabadulsi clan did not necessarily want this, but they cooperated with Somaliland's independence, based on their desire for peace and the fact that the SNM was superior militarily. After that, the Gabadulshi clan cooperated in stabilizing Somaliland, and acted as a third party in mediating disputes between the Isaaq clan. The Grand Conference of National Reconciliation in 1993 was held in Borama in Awdal.

In 2000, Borama Airport was closed.

From 2002 to 2010, the President of Somaliland was Dahir Riyale Kahin, from the Gadabuursi clan.

In March 2008, the President of Somaliland announced that the area centered on Zeila in the Awdal region would be separated to form the Salal region. However, it was not approved by the Somaliland parliament, and was reconfirmed that Zeila is in the Awdal region with the implementation of the “Local Government Act of 2019” in January 2020.

In February 2009, there was fighting between the Reer Hareed clan of the Gabiley District and the Reer Nuur clan of the Awdal region, and two people died. The conflict between the two clans dates back to 1998.

In July 2009, a riot broke out in Borama, Awdal, due to a clan conflict, and four people died.

In September 2010, an army of just under 300 troops, thought to be from the Ogaden National Liberation Front, invaded the area between Lughaya and Zeila in Awdal, but they were surrounded by the Somaliland army.

In June 2012, Rashid Hersi, who lives in Barrhaven, Ottawa, Canada, announced that Awdal had become independent and that he had been appointed president.

In February 2013, Suldaan Ibraahim Jaamac Samatar, one of the traditional leaders of Awdal, criticized Mohamed Nour Arrale, the Minister of the Interior of Somaliland, for interfering in the election of the Zeila Regional Council and worsening public security.

In April 2013, Awdal Governor criticized the large number of young people emigrating from Somaliland to other countries, and mentioned the need for restrictions.

=== The Rebellion of Suldaan Wabar ===
In August 2013, Suldaan Abubakar Wabar, the chief of the Jibriil Yoonis sub-clan of the Gadabuursi clan, criticized the Somaliland government for disrupting public order in Awdal and Salal, Somaliland.

In March 2014, Suldaan Ciise Suldaan C/laahi Suldaan Cumar was inaugurated as one of the Gadabuursi clan chiefs in Hayayaabe, west of Borama.

On December 5, 2014, the Jibriil Yoonis clan leader Suldaan Abuubakar Wabar led an army into the mountains and declared independence from the Somaliland government. On the other hand, Suldaan Saleebaan Cali Ismaaciil, another clan leader from Awdal, criticized Wabar's move, saying that the administration of Awdal should be left to the Vice President of Somaliland, who is from Awdal. Meanwhile, the Awdal elders' council visited Hargeisa, the capital of Somaliland, and requested that Awdal be given fair representation.

On March 18, 2015, intellectuals, businessmen, and politicians gathered at the home of Suldaan Wabar and announced that they would liberate the Awdal region from Somaliland and join the Federal Republic of Somalia.

On March 28, 2015, several militiamen who sympathized with Sultan Abikar Waberi surrendered to the Awdal regional government in Somaliland.

In April 2015, the Somaliland government arrested six of the 40 members of the committee established by Sultan Abikar Waberi.

In October 2015, a riot broke out at the Borama football stadium, and one civilian was killed in clashes with the police. The following day, the home of the Borama police chief was attacked and set on fire, and it burned down.

In October 2015, both Ethiopia and Somaliland began operations to withdraw the militias that follow Sultan Abikar Waberi, who is based near the border.

In November 2015, Suldaan Wabar left Somaliland and returned to North America, and the approximately 70 militiamen who had followed Wabar were incorporated into the Somaliland army.

In December 2016, there was drought damage in Awdal due to a lack of rain during the rainy season.

On December 27, 2016, there was information that Suldaan Abuubakar Wabar, the chief of the Jibriil Yoonis clan, had entered the base of the Ethiopian rebels, and the Somaliland military went on high alert in Borama.

=== After that ===
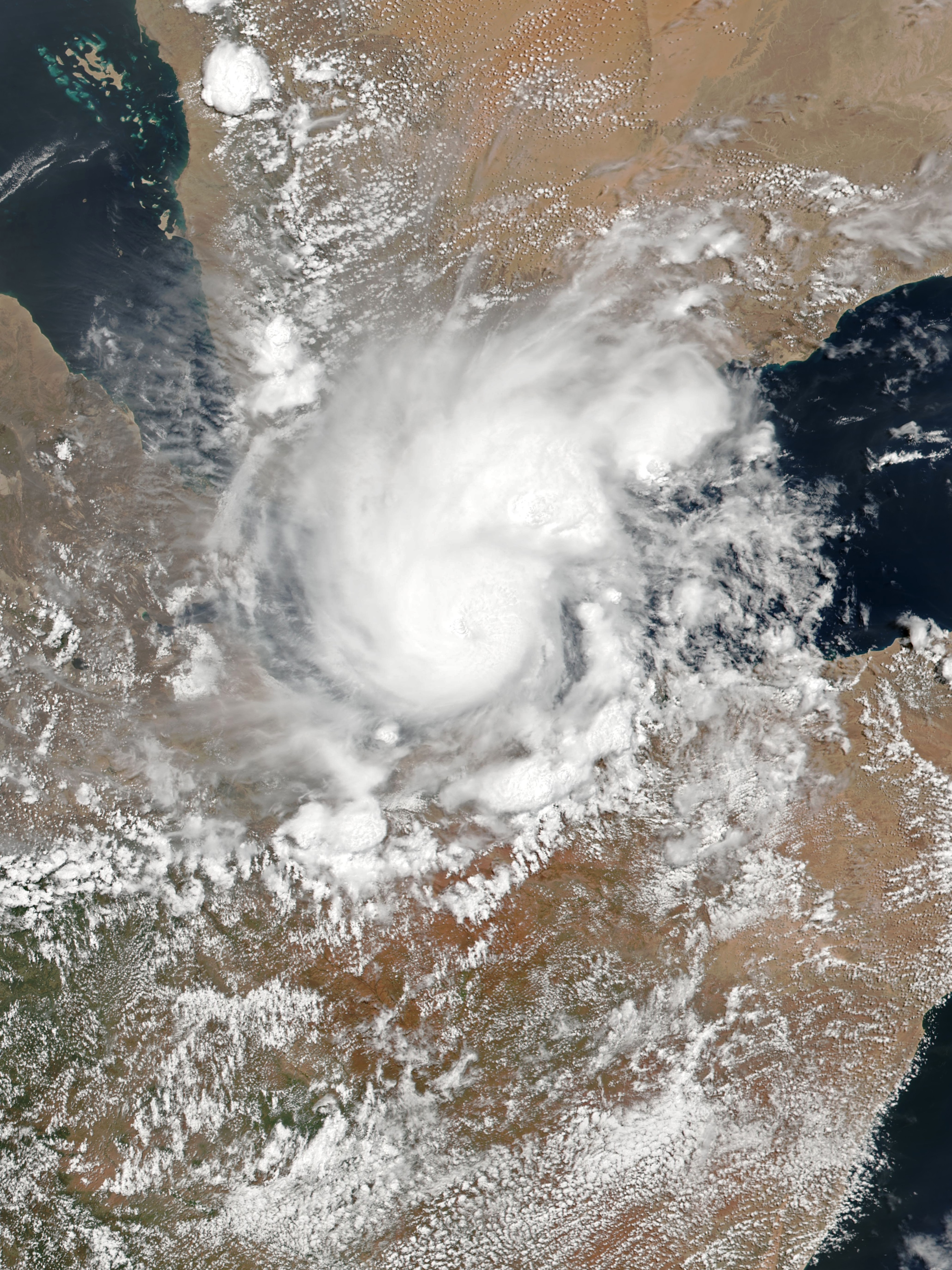
Cyclone Sagar in 2018

In August 2017, the governor of Awdal was dismissed by the Vice President of Somaliland for making many mistakes.

In May 2018, Cyclone Sagar hit Awdal, making it difficult to provide support to rural areas due to the flooding.

In June 2018, students from Awdal won second and fourth place in a Quran memorization contest hosted by the President, and were awarded by the President.

In July 2018, the Minister of Finance of Somaliland announced that the Awdal region had overtaken the Togdheer region to become the second highest contributor to the national treasury in terms of tax revenue.

In October 2019, a government vehicle was fired upon by unidentified armed forces in the Awdal region. As a result, one of the commanders of the Somaliland military visited Borama in Awdal and held a countermeasures meeting with the local government and traditional elders.

In November 2019, a video was sent to the media showing around 30 armed men who said they were “liberating” the area in eastern Borama, Awdal.

In December 2019, Sultan Mohamed Abshir Du'ale, one of the traditional leaders of the Awdal region, was arrested by the Somaliland government. It is thought that this was because he opposed the government's mining plans for the region. A protest demonstration by young people was held in Boroma, and one person was injured in a clash with the police.

On August 19, 2020, Sultan Abdirahman Dhawal, one of the traditional leaders of the Gadabuursi clan, argued that the Awdal allocation of the 82 Somaliland House of Representatives members should be increased from the current level (13 seats, 16%) to 40%.

On August 27, 2020, Ughaz Abdirashiid Ugaas Rooble, the Gadabuursi clan chief and a critic of the Awdal policy in Somaliland, set out from Ethiopia to Boroma by land, but was prevented from doing so by the Somaliland army On the same day, a violent demonstration broke out in Borama, and according to one account, several hundred young people took part.

There have been reports of incidents such as the armed clash that occurred in March 2022 between armed men and the Somaliland police at a gold mine near Borama, and the killing of three civilians in the town of Borama in May 2022 amid tensions between clans.

In May 2023, Somaliland's Vice President Abdirahman Saylici, who is from Awdal, criticized the Somaliland government for police officers assaulting young people demonstrating in Borama.

In September 2023, a meeting of the Gadabuursi clan was held in Ottawa, Canada, and 100 people, including the clan leader Ugaas Abdirashiid Ugaas Rooble, attended to establish the Awdal State Movement (ASM), which aimed to restore Awdal to Somalia. However, the influence to the Gadabuursi clan chief in Awdal is unknown as of 2023.

In October 2023, Somaliland's Vice President Abdirahman Saylici, who hails from Awdal, visited Borama and criticized ASM for operating outside Somaliland, saying that Awdal is definitely part of Somaliland.

In January 2024, an MoU was signed between Somaliland and Ethiopia. The details are unknown, but there is a theory that in return for Somaliland's approval, Ethiopia will lease an unspecified part of Somaliland's coast and establish a port and naval base. Demonstrations against this were held in Borama and Lughaya. In February, Somaliland MPs, including Awdal's representative, expressed their opposition to the MoU.

== Notable residents ==
- Dahir Riyale Kahin — former President of Somaliland
- Haji Ibrahim Nur — politician in British Somaliland
- Djama Ali Moussa — politician in French Somaliland
- Yusuf Tallan — former commander of the Somali armed forces
- Abdirahman Saylici — Vice President of Somaliland from 2010
- Djama Rabile Ghod — former Director of Somalia
- Muse Rabile Ghod — former Somali Minister of Transport
- Aden Isaq Ahmed — former Somali Defense Minister
- Suleiman Hassan Haddi — former mayor of Borama
- Mohammed Ahmed Alin — former governor of Awdal
- Abdurahman Ahmed Ali — former governor of Awdal
- Roble Afdeb — poet
- Ali Bu'ul — poet

== See also ==
- Administrative divisions of Somaliland
- Regions of Somaliland
- Districts of Somaliland
