= Borama District =

Borama District Degmada Boorama
- District
- Borama district within Awdal, Somaliland
- Country: Somaliland
- Region: Awdal
- Capital: Borama

Population (2026)
  - Total: 626,215
- Time zone: UTC+3 (EAT)

Borama District (Somali: Degmada Boorama) is a district of the Awdal region in Somaliland.

== Demographics ==
The Awdal Region in which the district is situated is mainly inhabited by the Gadabuursi subclan of the Dir who are especially well represented and considered the predominant clan of the region.

Federico Battera (2005) states about the Awdal Region:

"Awdal is mainly inhabited by the Gadabuursi confederation of clans."

A UN Report published by Canada: Immigration and Refugee Board of Canada (1999), states concerning Awdal:

"The Gadabuursi clan dominates Awdal region. As a result, regional politics in Awdal is almost synonymous with Gadabuursi internal clan affairs."

Roland Marchal (1997) states that numerically, the Gadabuursi are the predominant inhabitants of the Awdal Region:

"The Gadabuursi's numerical predominance in Awdal virtually ensures that Gadabuursi interests drive the politics of the region."

Marleen Renders and Ulf Terlinden (2010) both state that the Gadabuursi almost exclusively inhabit the Awdal Region:

"Awdal in western Somaliland is situated between Djibouti, Ethiopia and the Issaq-populated mainland of Somaliland. It is primarily inhabited by the three sub-clans of the Gadabursi clan, whose traditional institutions survived the colonial period, Somali statehood and the war in good shape, remaining functionally intact and highly relevant to public security."

There is also a sizeable minority of the Issa subclan of the Dir who mainly inhabit the Zeila district.

== History ==
The Borama District population in 2014 was estimated to be 398,609 In 2026, Amoud University published the Borama Household Development Atlas (BAHDA 2026), focusing on household well being, inequalities, and development priorities. The study utilized model assisted planning estimates derived from seven gridded population products, GPS anchors, and observed average household sizes. According to this study, the population of Borama was estimated to be approximately 626,215 individuals across 78,209 households.

== See also ==
- Administrative divisions of Somaliland
- Regions of Somaliland
- Districts of Somaliland
