= Districts of Somaliland =

- Category: Administrative district
- Location: Republic of Somaliland
- Found in: Regions
- Number: 22 (as of 2021)
- Government: District Administration
- Subdivisions: Villages, Settlements

The Districts of Somaliland (also known as local government districts) are second-level administrative subdivisions of Somaliland, below the level of region. There are a total of 22 district, each district is rated A, B, C, or D according to population, budget, and economic scale with the highest being A grade. The district where the state capital is located is always Class A (by Article 9 of the Local Government Law). The region with the most districts is Sanaag region (5), while the region with the fewest is Sahil region (2).

The notation follows the Somaliland 2019 Local Government Act.

== Grade of district ==
The mayor and deputy mayor of a grade A to C district are elected by the local council. The mayor and deputy mayor are elected individually, not as a set.

Grade D districts are divided into districts with provisional boundaries and districts with formal boundaries. The area of the provisional boundary district is up to 5 kilometers from the center of the district. In this district, the central government appoints a local administration consisting of a chairperson, vice chairperson, and secretary general. A Grade D district becomes a local council when its boundaries have been secured, the district has been revalued, and Parliament has approved it. However, there are no approved D districts as of 2021.

== History ==
From 1884 to 26 June 1960, Somaliland was divided into 6 administrative districts and the council (capital) was located in the city of the same name.

== List of Districts ==
=== Awdal Region ===
District	Grade	Capital	Comments	Location
Borama	A	Borama	Regional capital	
Zeila	B	Zeila		
Lughaya	C	Lughaya		
Baki	C	Baki		

=== Marodi Jeex Region ===
District	Grade	Capital	Comments	Location
Hargeisa	A	Hargeisa	Regional capital	
Gabiley	A	Gabiley		
Baligubadle	B	Baligubadle		
Salahlay	C	Salahlay		

=== Sahil Region ===
District	Grade	Capital	Comments	Location
Berbera	A	Berbera	Regional capital	
Sheikh	C	Sheikh		

=== Sanaag Region ===
District	Grade	Capital	Comments	Location
Erigavo	A	Erigavo	Regional capital	
El Afweyn	B	El Afweyn		
Garadag	C	Garadag		
Badhan	C	Badhan		
Dhahar	C	Dhahar		

=== Sool Region ===
District	Grade	Capital	Comments	Location
Las Anod	A	Las Anod	Regional capital	
Aynabo	C	Aynabo		
Hudun	C	Hudun		
Taleh	C	Taleh		

=== Togdheer Region ===
District	Grade	Capital	Comments	Location
Burao	A	Burao	Regional capital	
Odweyne	B	Odweyne		
Buhoodle	B	Buhoodle		

== See also ==
- Administrative divisions of Somaliland
- Regions of Somaliland
