= Zeila District =

Zeila District Degmada Saylac
- District
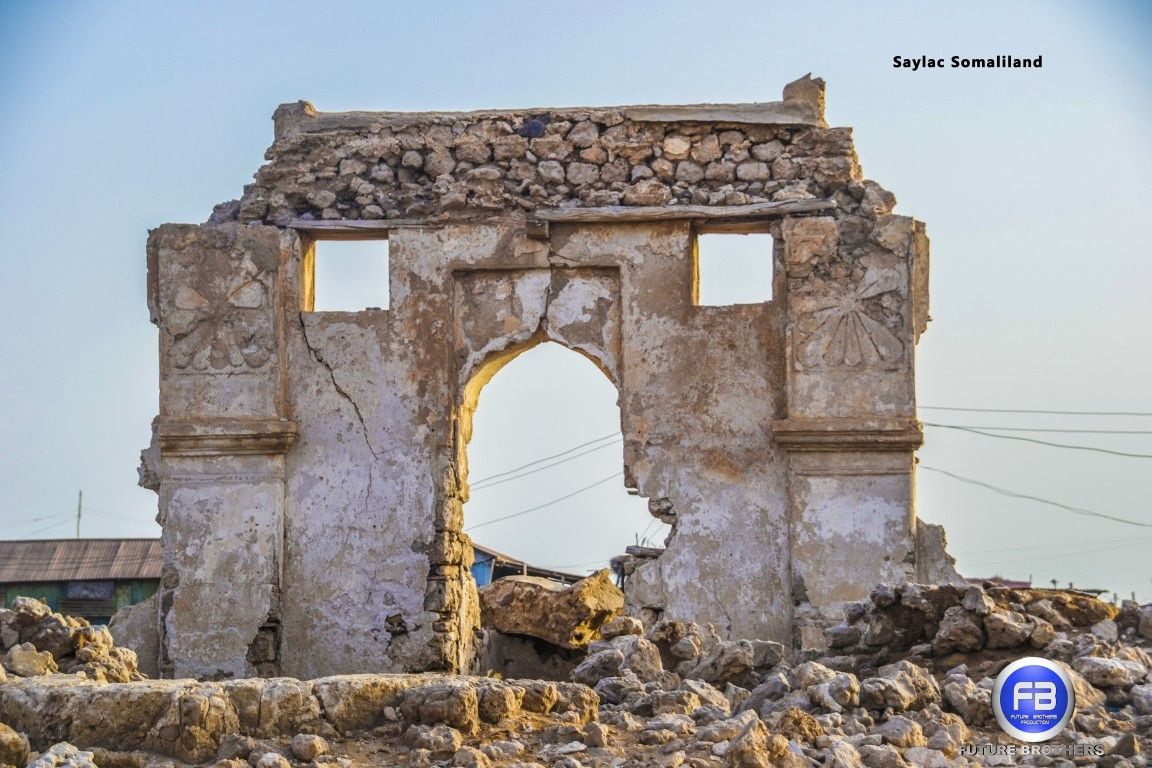
- Ruins of the Masjid al-Qiblatayn

- Zeila district within Awdal, Somaliland

- Location within Somaliland
- Country: Somaliland
- Region: Awdal
- Capital: Zeila

Population (2014)
  - Total: 76,951
- Time zone: UTC+3 (EAT)

Zeila District (Somali: Degmada Saylac) is a district in western Somaliland. Its capital is at Zeila.

== Demographics ==
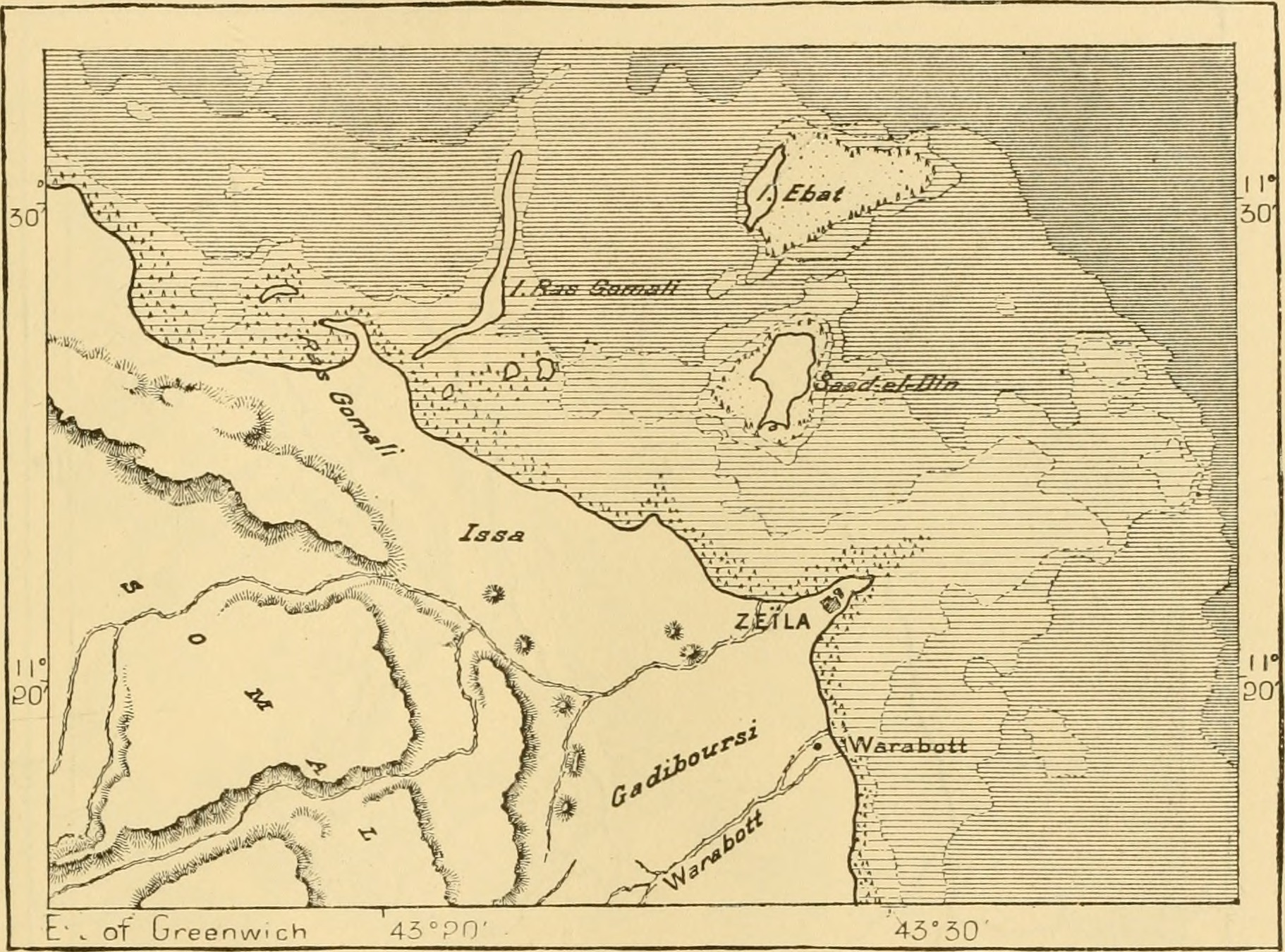
An old map of Zeila featuring the Gadabuursi and Issa subclans of the Dir clan family.

The town of Zeila is primarily inhabited by people from the Somali ethnic group, with the Gadabuursi subclan of the Dir especially well represented. The Issa subclan of the Dir are especially well represented in the wider Zeila District.

Tim Glawion (2020) describes the clan demographics of both the town of Zeila and the wider Zeila District:

"Three distinct circles can be distinguished based on the way the security arena is composed in and around Zeila: first, Zeila town, the administrative centre, which is home to many government institutions and where the mostly ethnic Gadabuursi/Samaron inhabitants engage in trading or government service activities; second, Tokhoshi, an artisanal salt mining area eight kilometres west of Zeila, where a mixture of clan and state institutions provide security and two large ethnic groups (Ciise and Gadabuursi/Samaron) live alongside one another; third the southern rural areas, which are almost universally inhabited by the Ciise clan, with its long, rigid culture of self-rule."

Elisée Reclus (1886) describes the two main ancient routes leading from Harar to Zeila, one route passing through the country of the Gadabuursi and one route passing through Issa territory. The author describes the town of Zeila and its immediate environs as being inhabited by the Gadabuursi, whereas the wider Zeila District and countryside south of the town, as being traditional Issa clan territory:

"Two routes, often blocked by the inroads of plundering hordes, lead from Harrar to Zeila. One crosses a ridge to the north of the town, thence redescending into the basin of the Awash by the Galdessa Pass and valley, and from this point running towards the sea through Issa territory, which is crossed by a chain of trachytic rocks trending southwards. The other and more direct but more rugged route ascends north-eastwards towards the Darmi Pass, crossing the country of the Gadibursis or Gudabursis. The town of Zeila lies south of a small archipelago of islets and reefs on a point of the coast where it is hemmed in by the Gadibursi tribe. It has two ports, one frequented by boats but impracticable for ships, whilst the other, not far south of the town, although very narrow, is from 26 to 33 feet deep, and affords safe shelter to large craft."

== See also ==
- Administrative divisions of Somaliland
- Regions of Somaliland
- Districts of Somaliland
