= Administrative divisions of Somaliland =

- Map of the Republic of Somaliland showing Administrative divisions of Somaliland and their capitals.
- Location: Republic of Somaliland
- Created by: Constitution of Somaliland
Subdivisions
- - Type: Number
  - Region: 6
  - District: 22
  - Village: Unknown

The administrative division of Somaliland are organized into three hierarchical levels. consists of 6 regions and 22 districts. Districts in turn contain villages. In addition, the capital Hargeisa has its own law (capital law) that is different from the law that defines administrative divisions. The administrative-territorial division of the country is established by the Law of Somaliland No. 23/2002 (Somali: Xeerka Ismaamulka Gobolada iyo Degmooyinka), which was finally approved in 2007.

Somaliland is a self-declared parlially recognised sovereign state in the Horn of Africa, internationally considered to be part of Somalia.

== History ==
Before March 21, 2008, the Somaliland government continued to use the six administrative regions covered by Somalia at the time of unification: Awdal, Waqooyi Gelbeed, Sanaag, Sool, Togdheer, Sahil. On March 22 of the same year, President Dahir Riyale Kahin issued the "Presidential Press Statement", announcing the establishment of 6 new administrative districts and 16 sub-districts from the original administrative divisions. On May 15 of the same year, the President announced the establishment of the 13th administrative district. In June 2014, Somaliland President Ahmed Mohamed Mohamoud announced the establishment of a 14th administrative district and 4 sub-districts. The new administrative district called Haysimo is composed of Sur and Sanaq in the east. However, the administrative divisions established by the two presidents were not approved by the Parliament.

== First-level divisions ==
According to the 2019 Local Government Act, Somaliland is divided into six regions (Somali: Gobolo; Arabic: مناطق). The territory of the region is based on British Somaliland and State of Somaliland administrative divisions, not Union-era.

Map	Region	Population (2014 estimate)	Area (km^{2})	Location
	Awdal Region	673,263	16,294	Western
	Sanaag Region	544,123	54,231	North Eastern
	Sool Region	327,428	39,240	South Eastern
	Togdheer Region	721,363	30,426	Eastern
	Marodi Jeh Region	1,242,003	17,429	Central
	Sahil Region	251,384	13,930	Northern

== Second-level divisions ==
Districts of Somaliland

There are 22 districts (Somali: Degmo; Arabic: مقاطعة). under the state. Each district is rated A, B, C, and D according to population, budget, and economic scale. The highest is A grade. The district where the state capital is located is always Class A (Article 9 of the Local Government Law). The region with the most districts is Awdal, Sool and conversely the region with the fewest is Sahil.

Region	District	Class
Awdal	Borama District	A
Awdal	Zeila District	B
Awdal	Baki District	C
Awdal	Lughaya District	C
Marodi Jeh	Hargeisa District	A
Marodi Jeh	Gabiley District	A
Marodi Jeh	Salahlay District	B
Marodi Jeh	Baligubadle District	
Sahil	Berbera District	A
Sahil	Sheikh District	C
Sanaag	Erigavo District	A
Sanaag	El-Afweyn District	B
Sanaag	Las Khorey District	C
Sanaag	Badhan District	
Sanaag	Garadag District	
Sanaag	Dhahar District	
Sool	Las Anod District	A
Sool	Aynabo District	C
Sool	Taleh District	C
Sool	Hudun District	C
Togdheer	Burao District	A
Togdheer	Oodweyne District	B
Togdheer	Buhoodle District	B

Awdal
- Borama District (A)
- Zeila District (B)
- Baki District (C)
- Lughaya District (C)
Marodi Jeh
- Hargeisa District (A)
- Gabiley District (A)
- Salahlay District (B)
- Baligubadle District
Sahil
- Berbera District (A)
- Sheikh District (C)
Sanaag
- Erigavo District (A)
- El-Afweyn District (B)
- Las Khorey District (C)
- Badhan District
- Garadag District
- Dhahar District

Sool
- Las Anod District (A)
- Aynabo District (C)
- Taleh District (C)
- Hudun District (C)
Togdheer
- Burao District (A)
- Oodweyne District (B)
- Buhoodle District (B)

== See also ==
- Regions of Somaliland
- Districts of Somaliland
- Somalia–Somaliland border
