= H.E. Muhdin Ahmed Hasen =

Ethiopian politician

Honorable Muhdin Ahmed Hasen
- ክቡር ሙህዲን አህመድ ሐሰን
- Speaker of the Harari National Council

Speaker of the Harari National Council
- Constituency: Jegol Liyu, Harar

Personal details
- Party: Prosperity Party
- Occupation: Politician

H.E. Muhdin Ahmed Hasen, is an Ethiopian politician and a Regional Council Member of the Harari Regional Council and Speaker of the Harari National Council representing the Jegol Liyu Harar Constituency under the ruling Prosperity Party.

== Overview ==
He hails from the Jibriil Yoonis subclan clan of the Gadabuursi and represents the Harari Regional Council where he serves as the Speaker of the Harari National Council.
