= Ughaz 'Elmi Warfa =

Ughaz 'Elmi Roble Warfa

King of the Gadabuursi Sultanate
- Reign: 1898–1934
- Predecessor: Ughaz Roble II
- Successor: Ughaz Abdi II
- Born: 1854; Zeila
- Died: 1934 (aged 79–80)
Names
- Ughaz 'Elmi Robleh Warfa "Kun ‘Iil"
- Father: Roble Warfa
- Mother: Shaqlan 'Igal
- Religion: Islam

Ughaz 'Elmi Roble Warfa or Ughaz 'Elmi Roble Warfa (Somali: Ugaas Cilmi Rooble Warfaa. Cilmi Dheere, Arabic: سلطان علمي روبل ورفا ) also known as 'Elmi Warfa was a Gadabursi King. his other nicknames were 'Elmi Dheire "'Elmi the Tall", because he was a very tall man and Kun ‘Iil " which means A Thousand Sorrows" (c. 1854–1934),

== History ==
The 13th in line of the Gadabuursi Ughazate. The term Ughaz is an authentic Somali term for Sultan, the paramount leader.

In the late 1890s, Elmi the Tall "Elmi Dheire" in favour with the British at that time was appointed the Sultan or Ughaz of all the Gadabuursi in the British Protectorate. 'Elmi the tall thus supplanted the traditional line that has been in place since the 16th century, the traditional line of Ughaz Nur II and his successor, Ugas Roble II, who had fallen out of favor with the British.

Ughaz 'Elmi's authority was recognized in an installation ceremony in 1917 in Zeila, the ancient port city. However the traditional successor of Ughaz Nur II, Ughaz Robleh II, remained the Sultan of the Gadabuursi's in the borders of Ethiopia.

'Elmi the Tall belonging to one of the Gadabuursi elders was a member of the delegation of Ughaz Nur II that had accompanied his visit to Egypt in the late 1870s and he was one of the elders who signed the treaty with the British at Zeila in 1884.

'Elmi the Tall's usurpation of the traditional Gadabuursi succession provoked other sub-clans and caused a lot of controversy. Many sub-clans, especially the rer Yunus or the Yunus branch felt it was their turn to vie for the Ughaz-ship. This sparked a conflict which was also conducted in poetic duels. These poems were rich imagery and symbolism. 2 of which were considered of the best were "Dhega Taag” (A Battle-Cry) by 'Elmi the Tall or 'Elmi Dheire' and the other called "Aabudle" (A Declaration of Faith) by Farid, Dabi-Hay 'Fariid Dhabi-Haye','Elmi's rival of the Yoonis branch.

Eventually, the rer Yonis succeeded Ughaz 'Elmi Roble Warfa at the end of his reign.

He was known for his bravery. One day a Lion was said to have entered his home and bedroom while he was sleeping. He Elmi swiftly grabbed the lion by his neck and quickly shifted towards grabbing the lion by his ears. The lion did not move an inch after that. After both his arms and hands were occupied with the lion. He shouted for support and he and his men killed the lion.

The modern town of Borama was established in 1921 by Ughaz 'Elmi Warfa, Ughaz of the Gadabuursi, under the directive of the British, who laid its foundations. It was subsequently designated as a district in 1925.
