= Ato Shemsedin Ahmed =

Notable Somali Ethiopian politician

Honorable Shemsedin Ahmed Robleh አቶ አህመድ Ato Shemsediin Axmed Rooble

Ambassador of Ethiopia to Kenya
- In office May 2011 – December 2014
- President: Girma Wolde-Giorgis Mulatu Teshome
- Preceded by: Ato Dissasa Dirbissa
- Succeeded by: Dina Mufti

Ambassador of Ethiopia to Djibouti
- In office May 2002 – May 2011

Deputy Minister of the Ministry of Mining and Energy
- In office August 1991 – December 1997

Vice Chairman of the Ethiopian Somali Democratic League
- In office 1994–?

Personal details
- Party: Ethiopian Somali Democratic League, Ethiopian Somali People's Democratic Party

Ato Shemsedin Ahmed or Ato Shemsedin Ahmed Robleh also referred to as Hon. Shemsedin Ahmed (Somali: Ato Shemsediin Axmed Rooble, Arabic: اتو شمسدين أحمد روبلي Amharic: አቶ አህመድ ),was a notable Somali Ethiopian politician.

== History ==
Shemsedin Ahmed hails from the Jigjiga Zone in the Somali region, also known as region 5 in Ethiopia, specifically the Makahildhere clan of the Makahil section of the Gadabursi clan. He was the vice-chairman of the Ethiopian Somali Democratic League and was one of the founders.

He served as Deputy-Minister of Mining and Energy since August 1991 to December 1997, Ethiopian Ambassador to Djibouti since May 2002 to May 2011 and also Ambassador of Ethiopia to Kenya from May 2011 to December 2014.

He replaced Ato Dissasa Dirbissa in May 2011 and was replaced by Dina Mufti in December 2014 for security reasons.
