= Jibril Yonis =

Sub-clan of the Gadabuursi (Samaroon)

The Jibril Yonis are a sub-clan of the Gadabuursi (Samaroon), a Somali clan belonging to the Dir (clan) family.

== Overview ==
The Jibril Yonis form part of the Yoonis lineage within the Gadabuursi clan structure. The Gadabuursi are predominantly found in the Awdal region of Somaliland, as well as parts of Ethiopia and Djibouti.

Historically, when the clan would meet for political affairs, the Jibril Yonis would be counted as one separate branch, on equal standing with the Habar Afan, Mahad 'Ase, and Reer Nuur sub groups of the Gadabuursi family .

== Distribution ==
Members of the Jibril Yoonis sub-clan are primarily associated with the Awdal region, particularly in and around Borama and surrounding districts.

However, they are also found in Djibouti, and the Somali Region of Ethiopia. Particularly in the Harrawa Valley, of the Somali region of Ethiopia.

== Lineage ==
The Jibril Yoonis are traditionally considered part of the Yonis lineage within the broader Gadabuursi clan structure.

The Gadabuursi are divided into two main divisions, the Habar Makadur and Habar 'Affan.

The Habar Makadur and Habar 'Affan, both historically united under a common Sultan or Ughaz.

- Gadabuursi
  - Habar Makadur
    - Makahil
      - Muse
        - Younis (Reer Yonis)
          - Jibril Younis (Jibriil Yoonis)

== Notable members ==
- Aden Isaq Ahmed, Somali politician
- Hassan Sheikh Mumin, Somali playwright
- Khadija Qalanjo
- Roble Afdeb
- Dahir Riyale Kahin
- Yussur A. F. Abrar
- Saharla Abdulahi Bahdon
- Aden Durde

== See also ==
- Gadabuursi
- Awdal
- Dir (clan)
