= Ughaz Nur II =

11th Ughaz of the Gadabuursi
- Reign: 1848–1898
- Predecessor: Ughaz Roble I
- Successor: Ughaz Roble II
- Born: Zeila
- Died: 1904, Dirri
Names
- Ughaz Nur Ughaz Roble or Ughaz Nur Roble
- Father: Ughaz Roble (Ugaas Rooble)
- Mother: Maro Geedi
- Religion: Islam

Ugaz Nunez' or Ugas Nur II' (Somali: Ugaas Nuur Ugaas Rooble , Arabic: سلطان نور سلطان روبلي ) also known as Ughaz Nur Robleh or aleduns (c. 1835–1898), was a Somali King and poet of the Gadabuursi clan.

== History ==
The 11th in line of the Gadabuursi Ughazate (Boqortooyadda ama Ugaasyadda Gadabuursi). The term Ughaz is an authentic Somali term for Sultan, the paramount leader.

He was born in Zayla in about the year 1835 and crowned in Bagi in 1848. He was from the Reer Ugaas subclan of the Makayl-Dheere. Of stature a tall and brown man with a short beard. He was known to have tall legs and long arms. During his youth, he loved riding, hunting and the traditional arts and memorized a great number of proverbs, stories and poems. He was the type to speak words that would never be forgotten once they entered people's ears. He was a brave and masculine man. Apart from that he was also a great and famous poet and during his reign there was not a man alive that could compete with him in poetry.

Eventually, Nur II came on to create his own store of sayings, poems and stories that are quoted to this day. He knew by heart the Gadabursi heer(customary law) and amended or added new heer during his reign. He was known for fair dealing to friend and stranger alike. It is said that he was the first Gadabursi Ughaz to introduce guards and askaris armed with arrows and bows.

During the time of Nur II both Egypt and Ethiopia were contending for power and supremacy in the Horn of Africa. To add the European colonial powers were also competing for strategic territories and ports in the Horn of Africa.

In the year 1876 Egypt using Islam as a bargaining chip signed a treaty with Ughaz Nuur and came to occupy the northern Somali coast which included Zayla, the seat of the Gadabuursi sultanate, but also to occupy the town of Harar and the Harar-Zeila-Berbera caravan route.

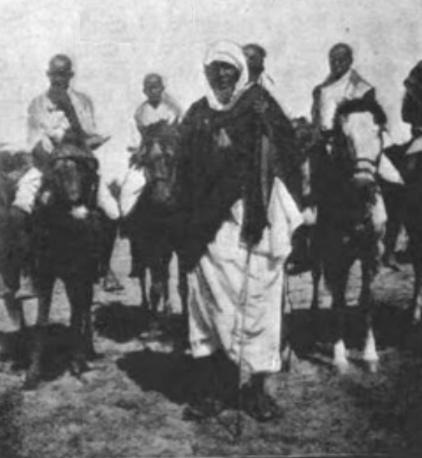
Ughaz Nur in his later years

Ughaz Nuur went to Egypt to meet Ismail Pasha, the khedive, belonging to the Ottoman Empire, who honored the King of the Gadabuursi with medals and expensive gifts. The Ughaz there signed a treaty accepting Egyptian protection of Muslims in Somaliland and Ethiopia.

The Ughaz had established strong relations with the Emir of Harar, Abdallah II ibn Ali . In 1887, when Harar was occupied by Menelik II of Ethiopia, Ughaz Nur sent Gadabursi askaris to support Abdallah II ibn Ali. The emir of Harar was eventually defeated and Ras Makonnen was appointed "Ethiopian governor of Harar". Menelik II continued to turn his attention to the Gadabuursi and offered the King (Ughaz Nur) and his people protection and military support for collaboration, seemingly a trap Ughaz Nur refused and fought until he died in 1898. He was buried in Dirri.

Even at old age of almost 80 Major Leckie writes about the King's aquiline features and graceful figure:

"Ugaz Nur was a old man of around almost 80 years. Although somewhat stiffened by age, he was tall, straight, and well built. Even the weight of his many years could not alter the King’s graceful figure. His aquiline Somali features that were so frequent among these people were, save his very dark skin, noticeably absent. His face indicated intelligence and a pleasant, affable nature "

=== Poetry ===
Ugas Nur was a famous poet and ranked among the greatest. He has created many poems and saying of which really explain the politics and knowledge of that time. How through patience and clever dealing one could be able to entrap one's enemy. He also used to say that whenever he heard a poem he would never forget it. His work was and is still taught in Somali Poetry classes (Suugaan Fasalka Koobaa) among other Somali poets. Many poets sampled Ugas Nur his work, for example, Professor Togane. Ugas Nur his poetry is described as the following in the Horn of Africa journal:

"I am taken back to the magnificent oral poetry (witness Ugaas Nuur's lines), to the idyllic sweetness of the pastoral world in which I was born and spent my adolescent years, and to which I yearn to return"

==== Poems ====
The poem was first recorded in the "Gadabuursi Somali Script", by I.M. Lewis in 1958 but he omitted some lines. It was covered in its entirety in "War and Peace an Anthology of Somali Literature".

Allahayow nin ii daran maxaan daafta hore seexshay
Nin ii daaqsanaayana maxaan daafida u kariyey
Jidhku nin uunan doonayn maxaan hadalka deeqsiiyay
Ma degdego’e xaajada maxaan ugu dulqaad yeeshay
Weji debecsan dayma’an dareen gelin dubaaqiisa
Dibna furan dabuub una ka didin deexashiyo muuso
Qosol dibadda yaalloon ka iman dhuunta dacalkeeda
Kanaan degey kanaan doorka biday kani dan baan mooday
Waxaan dood kaftana sheekadaa ugu daleeyaaba
Dabinkaan u dhigay maalintuu dacalka soo saaro
Intiyoon dawaarka u rogoon xeeladda u daadsho
Isagoon digniin qabin maxaan kaga dayaan siiyey!

— Ugaas Nuur Rooble Nin ii Daran
Translation:

Oh God how I have allowed a man who is bad for me to sleep in the daaf of the aqal (somali tent)
How I have cooked cereal for a man who grazes (his horse) for (attacking) me
How I have been generous in speech to a man the body rejects
How I have shown patience in matters and have not been hasty
With a pleasant mien and glance, thoughts (of hostility) have not entered his mind
With open lips discussion with no specific point, talkativeness and smiling
A laugh on the surface which has not come from inside the throat
I put this down, preferred that, I think this is for the best
I decorate the discourse with joking discussion
On the day he stepped upon the edge of the trap I set for him
Like pedalling a sewing machine into motion I spread the cunning for him
Without any warning how I struck him down!
