= Saharla Abdulahi Bahdon =

Ethiopian politician

Honorable Saharla Abdulahi Bahdon
- Constituency: Constituency 16 Addis Ababa

Personal details
- Party: Prosperity Party
- Occupation: Member of Parliament of the House of Peoples' Representatives of the Federal Democratic Republic of Ethiopia, State Minister of Health of the Federal Democratic Republic of Ethiopia, Director General of the Petroleum and Energy Authority.
- Profession: Health

Saharla Abdulahi Bahdon, is an Ethiopian politician and a member of the House of Peoples' Representatives of Ethiopia representing Constituency 16 of the capital Addis Ababa under the ruling Prosperity Party.

== Overview ==
Saharla Abdulahi Bahdon hails from the Reer Dudub of the Jibriil Yoonis subclan of the Gadabuursi and became the first Somali to ever win a seat in the House of People's Representatives' serving a constituency in the capital city, Addis Ababa. She was previously House of People's Representatives' serving the Arabi Constituency.
