= Abdi Hassan Buni =

Somali politician

Abdi Hassan Buni عبدي حسن بوني نور Personal life Abdi Hassan Buni is survived by his beloved wife of 36 years until his death Sirad Omar Dubed, 8 boys and 6 girls.
- President: Aden Adde Dahir Riyale Kahin

Personal details
- Born: Borama, British Somaliland (now Somaliland)
- Died: London, United Kingdom
- Citizenship: Somali Netherlands
- Party: USP, United Somali Party
- Education: Amoud University
- Profession: Politician, minister, deputy prime minister business
- Nickname: Haji

Abdi Hassan Buni or Abdi Hassan Buuni (Somali: Cabdi Xassan Buuni, Arabic: عبدي حسن بوني) was a Somali Politician, Minister under the British Somaliland Protectorate and was the first Deputy Prime Minister of the Somali Republic. He was part of the USP, the United Somali Party, a British Somaliland Protectorate political party.

== History ==
Abdi Hassan Buni hails from the Awdal region of Somalia and belongs to the Xeebjire, Habr 'Affan (Habar Cafaan) Gadabursi (Gadabuursi) clan. He was one of the ministers selected of the United Somali Party to become Deputy Prime Minister in the Aden Abdulle administration of the newly formed Somali Republic at that time, a unification between two territories Somaliland British Protectorate and UN Somali Trustee (Somalia Italiana).

In 1964 Buni was re-elected to the parliament of the Somali Republic. In 1969 he became the head of the Golweyn Banana Project in Lower Shabelle. Buni served as CEO of Agricultural Equipment Manufacturing Company (AITCO) from 1982 to 1984. After the military coup in Somalia, Buni retired from politics. In the aftermath of the collapse of the Somali Republic he was involved in peacebuilding activities. He served as chairman of the Somaliland Peacebuilding Commission from 1995 to 1997.

In 2002 Abdi Hassan Buni made a return to politics and became part of the first government formed by President Dahir Riyale Kahin. Buni served as Minister of Council Relations of Somaliland from 2003 until his death in 2009.

Buni was a successful entrepreneur and owned the Buni Hotel on the outskirts of Mogadishu as well as the famous Harawo Hotel in Borama, which was built in 1962.

Abdi Hassan Buni died in London with his wife and children by his side on the 1st of June 2009.

=== Education ===
- Elementary School Borama (1946-1948)
- Intermediate School Sheikh (1949–1950)
- Administration and Management in Addis Ababa, Yemen (1953)
- V.T.C Amoud (Correspondence Course) (1954–1955 )

=== Career ===
- Deputy Prime Minister (1960)
- Re-elected to the Parliament of the Somali Republic (1964)
- CEO of Agricultural Equipment Manufacturing Company (AITCO) (1982-1984)
- Head of the fishing company (AFCO) (1985-1997)
- Chairman of the Somaliland Peacebuilding Commission (1995-1997)
- Minister of Council Relations Republic of Somaliland (2003-2009)
