= Ughaz =

Somali title

Ughaz (sometimes spelled Ugaas, Ugas or Ougaz) is a traditional Somali title. It is primarily used by the Dir and Darod clans.

== Etymology ==
According to Italian linguist Giorgio Banti, the term "Ughaz" is of Ethio-Semitic origin. However Djiboutian researcher, Ali Moussa Iye, states that the term "Ughaz" is composed of the two Somali terms "ul" and "gaas" meaning "the stick of the warrior’s chief". American archeologist, Julien Cooper, labeled "gas/gos" as a pan-Cushitic kinship root word with various reflexes such as "Ughaz" in Somali and "Gosa" in Burji. He later stated that this required further research.

== History ==
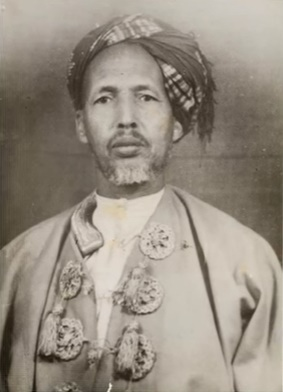
Ughaz Dodi of the Gadabuursi clan in the 1950s

After the downfall of the Adal Sultanate in the sixteenth century, the region descended into turmoil, which led to the establishment of the Ughaz. This figure was endowed with the authority to resolve conflicts among the different Somali clans, in addition to other responsibilities. According to I. M. Lewis, in the early 1600s Ughaz Ali Makahil successfully repelled the Oromo Invasions in modern northern Somalia. In the Issa clan, the Wardiq sub-clan traditionally elects the Ughaz.

Following the Egyptian invasion of Harar in the nineteenth century, the Ughaz of prominent Somali tribes in the region of Harar received the role of wakils for the Egyptians. In the late 1800s French trader Alfred Bardey states the Ughaz were responsible for ensuring the safety of the route connecting Harar and Zeila from any disturbances. The Ughaz appeared to exert significant influence in the Emirate of Harar, as the sister of Emir Abdullahi II was wed to a member of the Ughaz.

In the early 1900s, subsequent to the deposition of the appointed Ethiopian emperor Lij Iyasu, the Ogaden governor, Abdullahi Sadiq, was apprehended along with several Ughaz by Ethiopian authorities in Harar. This group included Ughaz Hasan from Ogaden, Ughaz Omar representing the Malingoor, Robleh Nur of the Gadabuursi, and members of Rer Dalal, among others.

== Places ==
- Ugaas Noor Airport, airport in central Somalia
- Ugaas Khaliif International Airport, airport in southern Somalia
- Ugaas Mirad Ugaas Leyli Airport, airport in eastern Ethiopia
- Ughaz formerly Garad Ughaz, village in the Harar region of Ethiopia

== Notable Ughaz ==
- Nur II
- Elmi Warfa
- Yasin Ugas Abdurahman
- Hassan Ugas Yasin
- Roble I

== See also ==
- Garad
- Malak
