= Djama Ali Moussa =

French politician (1910–1959)

Senator Djama Ali Moussa
- جمة علي موسي
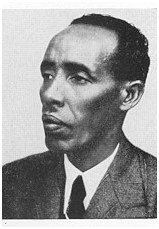
- Born: 1910; Awdal, British Somaliland
- Died: 19 November 1959 (aged 48–49)
- Occupations: Sailor, politician, merchant
- Office: 1st Somali Senator and Head of State of Djibouti

Djama Ali Moussa Zayli'i (Somali: Jaamac Cali Muuse Saylici, Arabic: جمة علي موسي) was a Somali politician. He was a politician of the former French Somaliland, currently known as Djibouti.

Born in Awdal, he became one of the first Senator and Somali head of state from Djibouti or French Somaliland. His family was from the Mahadcase, Bahabar Celi section of the Gadabuursi clan, part of the wider Dir clan.

== History ==
Djama Ali Moussa born in 1910 in Awdal then British Somaliland, before he entered politics he used to be a sailor. He was elected as the first representative of French Somaliland in the French National Assembly in 1946, and in December that year he was also elected as the first Somali head of French Somaliland.

== Political Affiliation ==
- Groupe de l'Union Républicaine
- Résistante pour l'Union Française
