= Sultan Mahomed Haji Dideh =

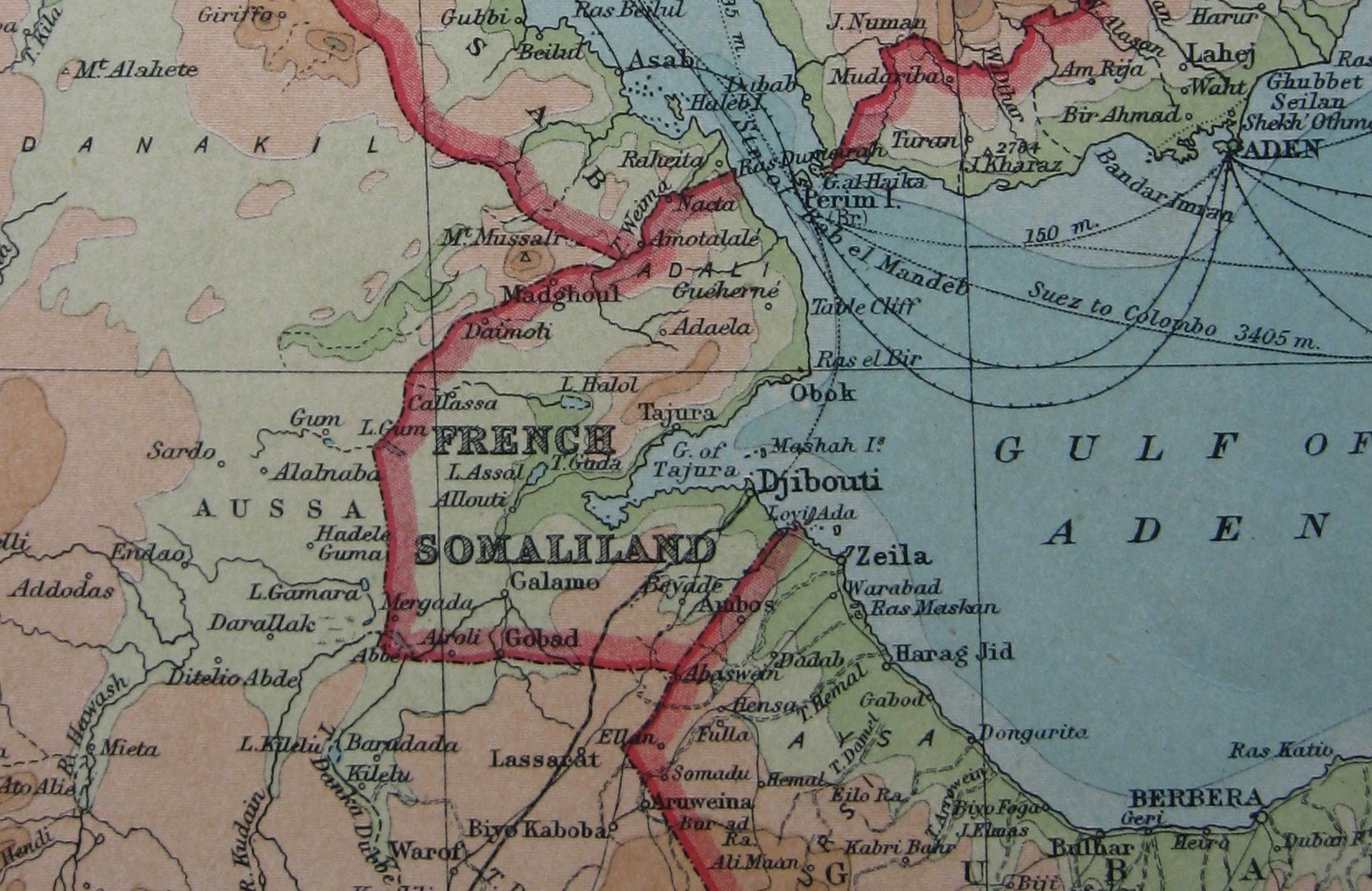
Cote Francaise des Somalis or French Somaliland

Sultan Mahomed Haji Dideh (Somali: Xaaji Diide), also known as Haggi Diideh, was Sultan of Zeila of the former Ifat and Adal Kingdom.

== History ==
As is shown in "Morin" (2005), the name of former Djibouti, “Cote Francaise des Somalis” is said to have been proposed by Mohamed Haji Dide of the Mahad 'Ase, Bahabar Celi branch of the Gadabuursi. He came on to build the first Mosque in Djibouti "Gami ar-Rahma" in 1891.
