= Habar Makadur =

Northern Somali clan

The Habar Makadur, also known as Habar Makadoor, Habar Makadour, or Habar Maqdi, are a subsection of the Gadabuursi Dir clan family.

They reside primarily in three countries: Djibouti, Somaliland, and Ethiopia.

== Distribution ==
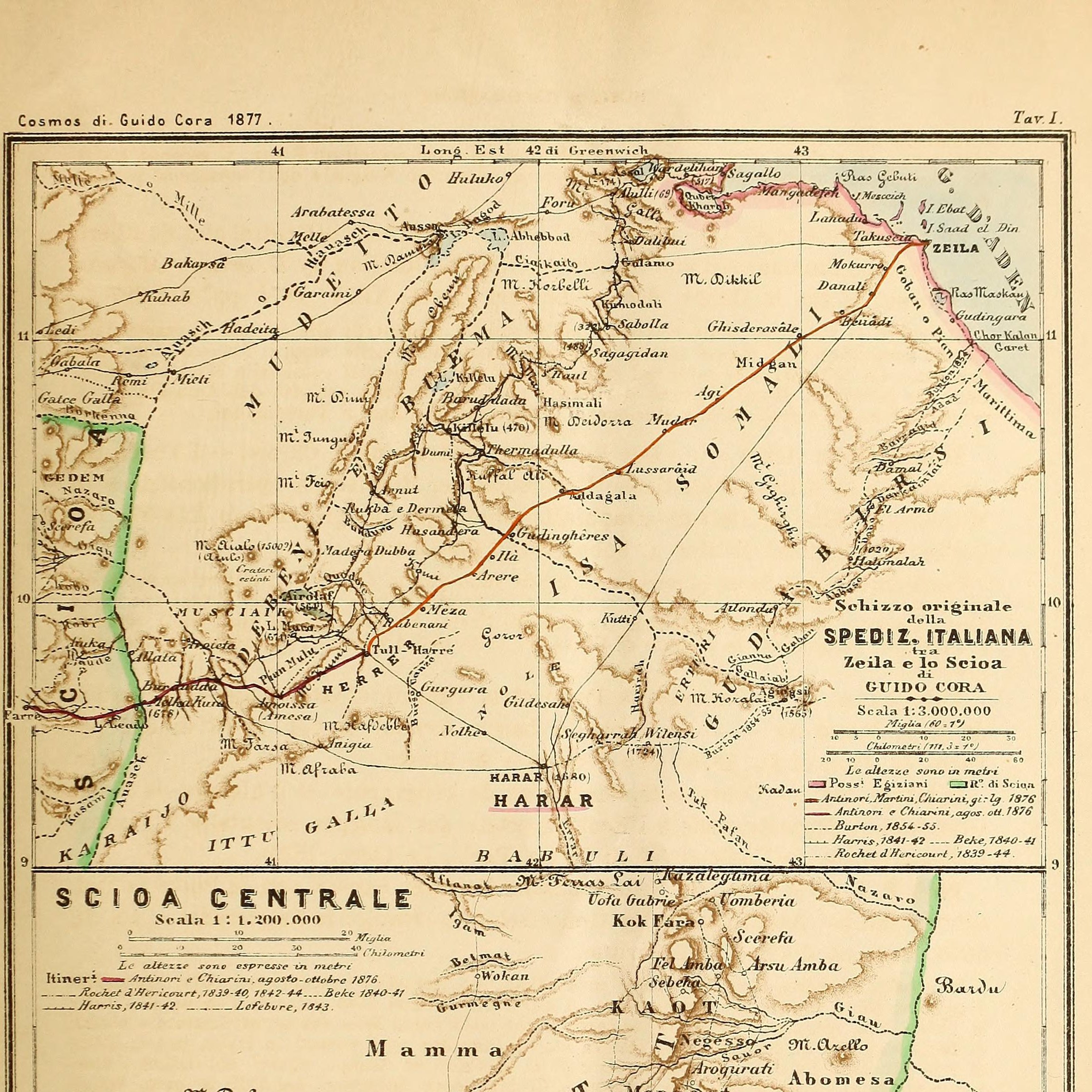
An old map showing the trade routes from Zeila to Harar featuring the Gadabuursi clan

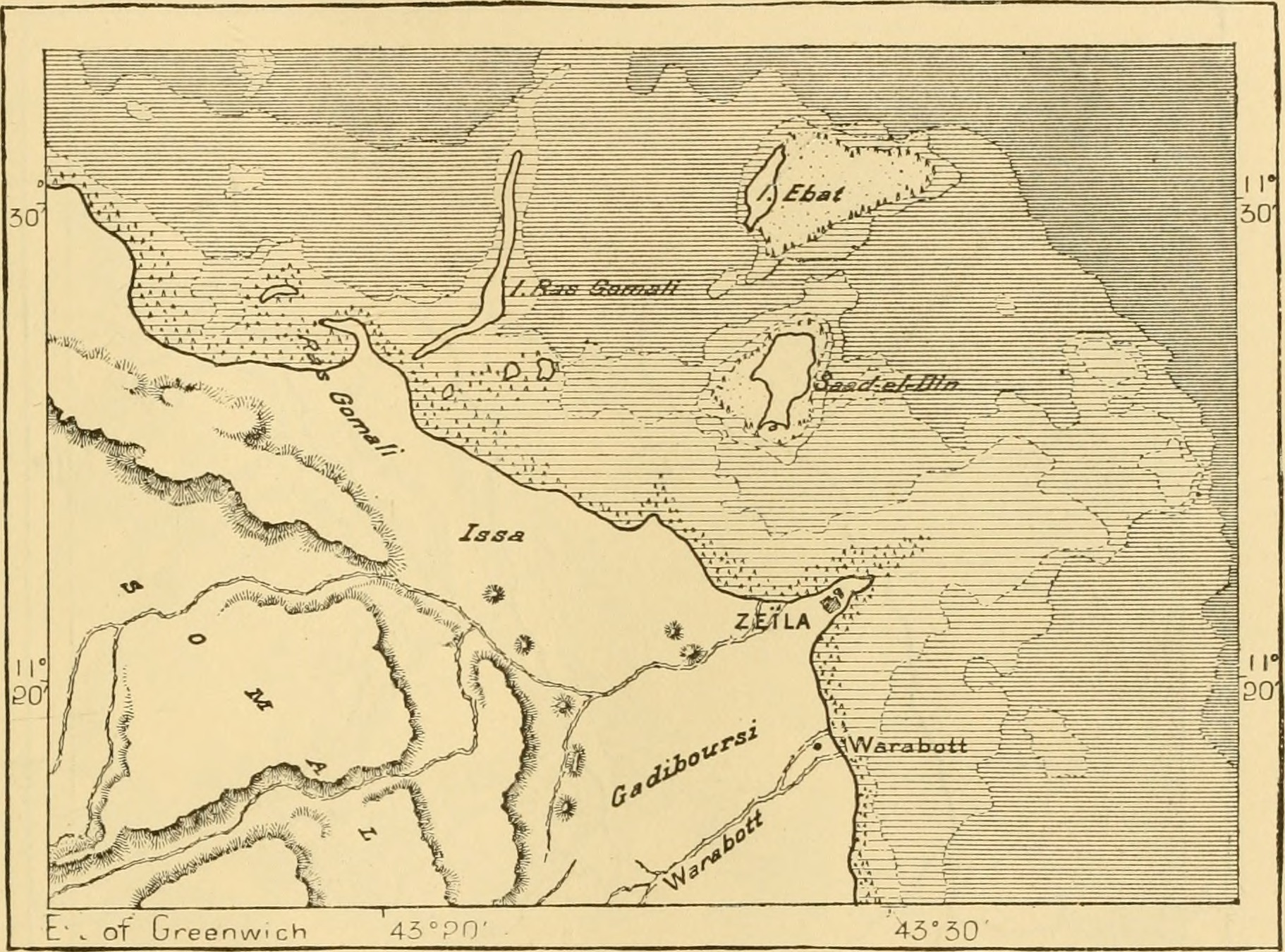
An old map of Zeila featuring the Somali Gadabuursi Dir clan.

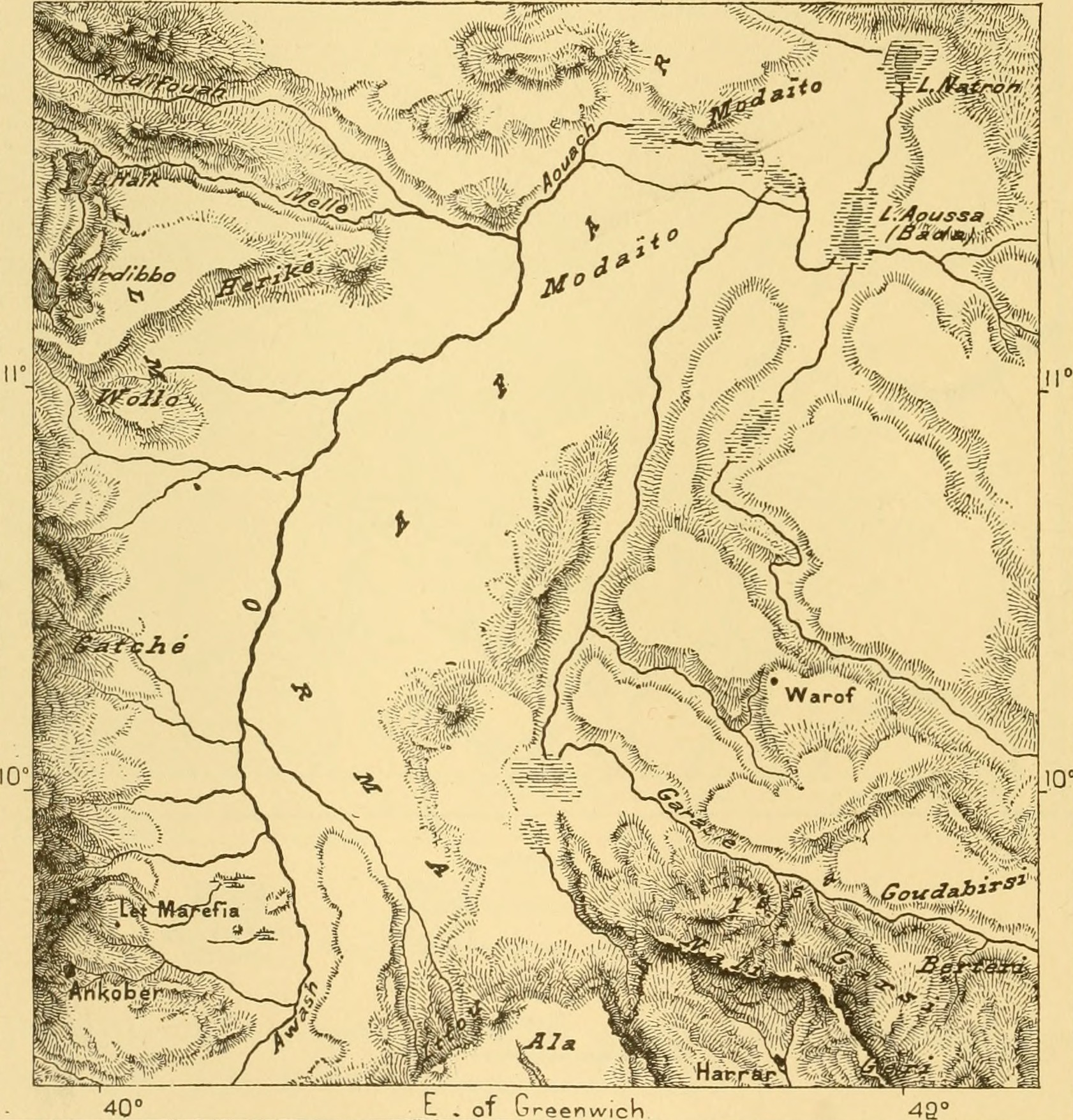
An old map of Harar featuring the Somali Gadabuursi Dir clan.

The Habar Makadur peoples have historically lived in and around Zeila, the Red Sea, and the Gulf of Aden. The Habar Makadur subclan is primarily found in:

- Djibouti: They form a significant portion of the Somali population in Djibouti, particular in Quartier 5 of Djibouti City.
- Ethiopia: In Ethiopia, they are predominantly found in the Somali region, Harar, and Dire Dawa. The Habar Makadur clan historically lived in Harar and its surrounding areas. The Gadabuursi controlled trade routes up to Zeila and had connections with the emirs of Harar.
- Somaliland: They inhabit the northwestern region, particularly in the Awdal region, and in the Gabiley District within Maroodi jeeh district.

== History ==
=== Role in the Adal Sultanate ===
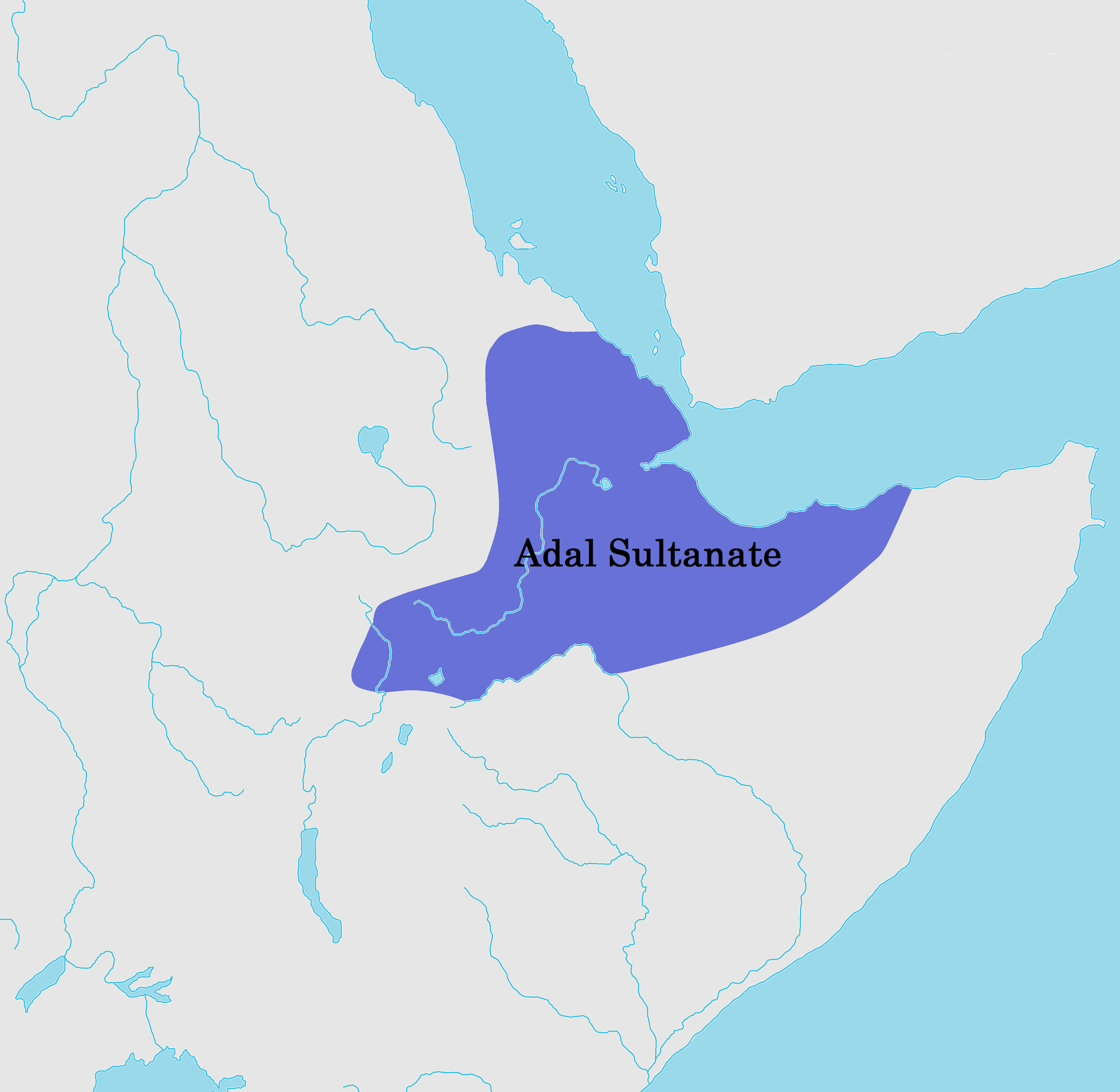
Territory of the Habar Makadur peoples, within the Adal sultanate.

The Habar Makadur have played a crucial role in the Adal Sultanate, a medieval Muslim state in the Horn of Africa. The Gadabuursi, including the Habar Makadur, fought against the Ethiopian kingdom, during the events of the Conquest of Abyssinia. This campaign was led by Imam Ahmed Gurey also known as Ahmad ibn Ibrahim al-Ghazi.

The Futuh al-Habasha describes their participation in several battles and their significant contributions to the military campaigns of Ahmed Gurey. They were among the first clans to join the battle and were known for their large armies and loyalty to Imam Ahmed Gurey.

I. M. Lewis gives an invaluable reference to an Arabic manuscript on the history of the Gadabuursi Somali. 'This Chronicle opens', Lewis tells us, 'with an account of the wars of Imam 'Ali Si'id (d. 1392) from whom the Gadabuursi today trace their descent, and who is described as the only Muslim leader fighting on the western flank in the armies of Se'ad ad-Din, ruler of Zeila.

I. M. Lewis (1959) states:

"Further light on the Dir advance and Galla withdrawal seems to be afforded by an Arabic manuscript describing the history of the Gadabursi clan. This chronicle opens with an account of the wars of Imam 'Ali Si'id (d. 1392), from whom the Gadabursi today trace their descent and who is described as the only Muslim leader fighting on the Western flank in the armies of Sa'd ad-Din (d. 1415), ruler of Zeila."

I. M. Lewis (1959) also highlights that the Gadabuursi were in conflict with the Galla, during and after the campaigns against the Christian Abyssinians:

"These campaigns were clearly against the Christian Abyssinians, but it appears from the chronicle that the Gadabursi were also fighting the Galla. A later leader of the clan, Ugas 'Ali Makahil, who was born in 1575 at Dobo, north of the present town of Borama in the west of the British Protectorate, is recorded as having inflicted a heavy defeat on Galla forces at Nabadid, a village in the Protectorate."

Shihab al-Din Ahmad mentions the Habr Maqdi (Habr Makadur) by name in his famous book Futuh al Habasha. He states:

"Among the Somali tribes there was another called Habr Maqdi, from which the imam had demanded the alms tax. They refused to pay it, resorting to banditry on the roads, and acting evilly towards the country."

Richard Pankhurst (2003) states that the Habr Maqdi are the Habr Makadur of the Gadabuursi.

=== The Conquest of Abyssinia ===
The Habar Makadur clan played a prominent role in the Adal-Abyssinian War. They were known for their large and well-equipped armies. Their strategic location and involvement in various battles have been noted as a crucial part of the campaign, especially their interactions with Imam Ahmed Gurey.

The Habar Makadur were known as skilled patrolmen who controlled the route to Berbera, during the Conquest of Abyssinia.

=== Ahmed Gurey ===
The Habar Makadur of the Gadabuursi, consider the Imam Ahmed Gurey of the Adal Sultanate, a descendant from Abrayn of the Mahad 'Ase from the Awdal region.

Born in Zeila, the Habar Makadur claim Imam Ahmed Gurey as from Abrayn, Mahad Ase, Makadur.

== Genealogy ==
The genealogy of the Habar Makadur traces back to Sheikh Samaroon.

Prominent figures from the Habar Makadur, including Husain Musa Bin 'Abd Allah Makida/Habar Makadur. Hussain was a prominent figure in within the Gadabuursi family in the Adal Sultanate.

=== Sub Clans ===
The Habar Makadur are divided into two sub clans known as the Makahil and Mahad 'Ase, shown below:

==== Makahil ====
- 'Eli
- 'Iye
- 'Abdalle (Bahabar 'Abdalle)
- Hassan (Bahabar Hassan)
- Muse
- Younis

Further divisions of the Makahil are shown within the Muse and Younis subclans.

===== Muse =====
- Makail Dera (Makayl-Dheere)
- Af Gudud (Gibril Muse)
- Bah Sanayo

===== Younis (Reer Yoonis) =====
- Ali Younis
- Jibril Younis
- Adan Younis
- Nur Younis (Reer Nuur)

The divisions of the Mahad 'Ase are shown below.

==== Mahad 'Ase ====
- Bahabar Abokor
- Bahabar Muse
- Habr Musa
- Bahabar Aden
- Bababar 'Eli
- Reer Mohamed
- Ibrahim (Abrayn), also known as the sub clan of Ahmed Gurey.
