= Mawlid Hayir =

Ethiopian politician

Honorable Mawlid Hayir Hassan
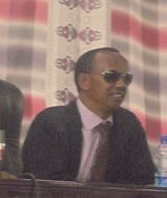

Personal details
- Born: Jijiga, Ethiopia
- Party: Ethiopian Somali People's Democratic Party
- Profession: Regional Vice-President of the Somali Region

Mawlid Hayir—more fully, in Somali, Mudane Mawliid Haayir Xassan, meaning the Honorable Mawlid Hayir Hassan—is the regional vice-president of one of the nine divisions (kililoch) of Ethiopia: the Somali regional state. He is a member of the Somali regional parliament, serving it as a member of the ruling Ethiopian Somali People Democratic Party (ESPDP). He is also the head of the BOE and the co-chair of the RNCB. He hails from the Makayl-Dheere clan of the Gadabuursi.
