= Heregel =

Heregel Xerogeel
- Town
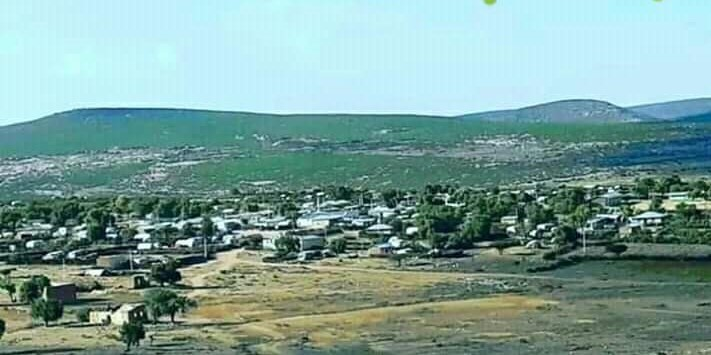
- .

- Location in Ethiopia
- Coordinates: 9°39′19″N 42°52′38″E
- Country: Ethiopia
- Region: Somali Region
- District: Awbare, Fafan Zone
- Time zone: UTC+3 (EAT)
- Climate: BSh

Heregel or Herogeel (Somali: Xerogeel, Arabic: حرجيل), is a town located in the western Fafan Zone in the Somali region of Ethiopia in the Awbare district. Jijiga is 48 km south of Heregel, whereas Awbare is 46 km northeast of Heregel.

== Demographics ==
The town and surrounding region is primarily inhabited by the Reer Ughaz subclan of the Makayl-Dheere branch of the Gadabuursi Dir clan.

== History ==
It was established in the 19th Century by the Ugasite Kingdom which built the town. Traditionally it was a center of Somali literature. It served, along with the town of Awbare, as the center of the Ugasite Kingdom at the time of Ugas Dodi Ugas Roble.

== Economy ==
70% of the inhabitants work in agriculture. The other 30% works in business and commercial activities. According to the projection-based census in 2015, the population of Heregel town and its kebeles (wards) was estimated at 65,435 people.
