= Harrawa Valley =

Harrawa Valley Harawwah Valley
- Valley
- Country: Ethiopia
- Region: Somali Region, Harar
- District: Awbare, Fafan Zone, Dembel, Sitti Zone and Harar
- Time zone: UTC+3 (EAT)
- Climate: BSh

The Harrawa Valley (Somali: Dooxada Harawo) (also spelled: Harawwah, Harrawah, Harawa) is a long running valley located in the Gadabuursi country, north of Harar, Ethiopia. The Harrawa Valley is home to many of the principal and most well known settlements of the Gadabuursi Dir clan, such as Derwernache, Arabi, Dhamal, Hadawe and many other towns and villages.

== History ==
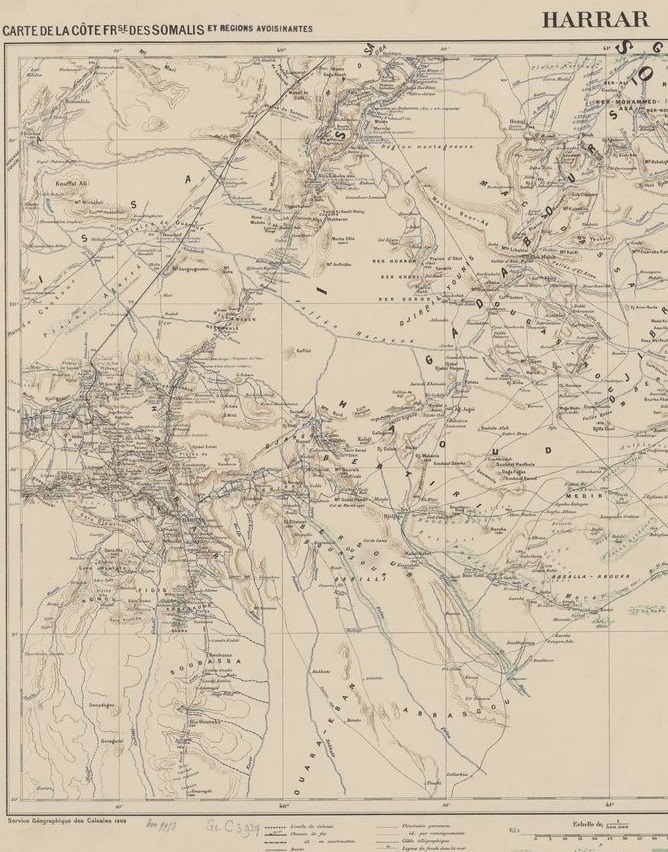
An old map of Harar featuring the Somali Gadabuursi Dir clan.

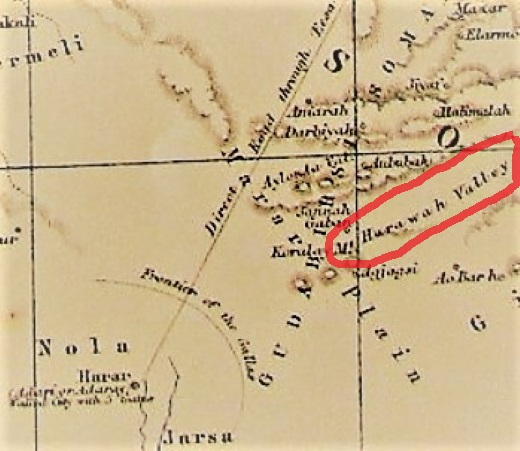
An old map featuring the Harrawa Valley in the Gadabuursi country, north of Harar.

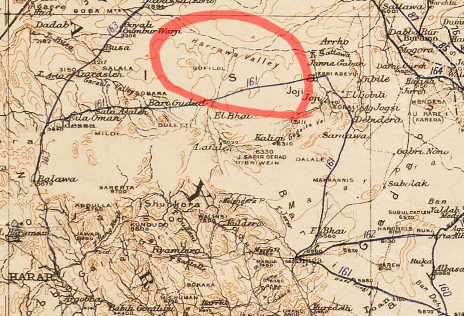
An old map featuring the Harrawa Valley in the Gadabuursi country, north of Harar.

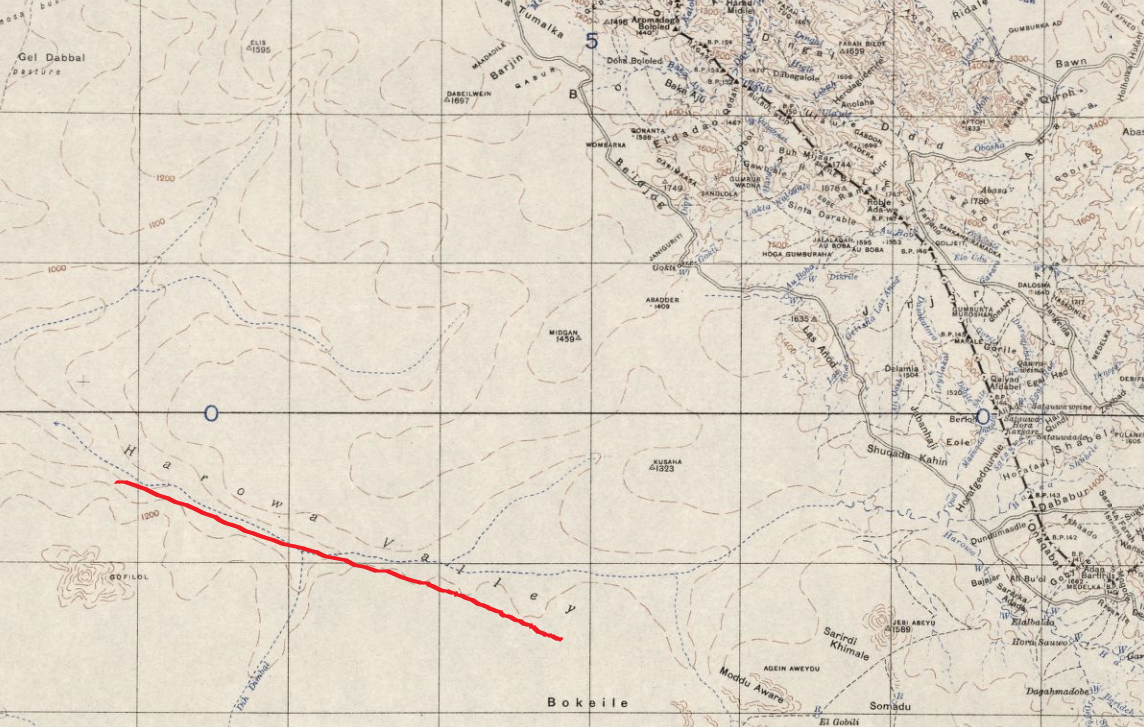
An old map featuring the Harrawa Valley in the Gadabuursi country, north of Harar.

The Harrawa Valley is considered to be, alongside the Awdal Region, at the heart of the Gadabuursi country.

Richard Francis Burton (1856) describes the Harrawa Valley in the Gadabuursi country, as within sight of Harar in his book First Footsteps in East Africa:

"In front, backed by the dark hills of Harar, lay the Harawwah valley. The breadth is about fifteen miles: it runs from south-west to north-east, between the Highlands of the Girhi and the rolling ground of the Gudabirsi Somal, as far, it is said, as the Dankali country. Of old this luxuriant waste belonged to the former tribe; about twelve years ago it was taken from them by the Gudabirsi, who carried off at the same time thirty cows, forty camels, and between three and four hundred sheep and goats."

Richard Francis Burton (1856) describes the Ughaz of Gadabuursi hosting equestrian games in the Harrawa Valley, in his book First Footsteps in East Africa:

"Here, probably to commemorate the westward progress of the tribe, the Gudabirsi Ugaz or chief has the white canvass turban bound about his brows, and hence rides forth to witness the equestrian games in the Harawwah Valley."

Richard Francis Burton (1856) describes the flora and fauna of the Harrawa Valley in his book First Footsteps in East Africa:

"For six hours we rode the breadth of the Harawwah Valley: it was covered with wild vegetation, and surface-drains, that carry off the surplus of the hills enclosing it. In some places the torrent beds had cut twenty feet into the soil. The banks were fringed with milk-bush and Asclepias, the Armo-creeper, a variety of thorns, and especially the yellow-berried Jujube: here numberless birds followed bright-winged butterflies, and the “Shaykhs of the Blind,” as the people call the black fly, settled in swarms upon our hands and faces as we rode by. The higher ground was overgrown with a kind of cactus, which here becomes a tree, forming shady avenues. Its quadrangular fleshy branches of emerald green, sometimes forty feet high, support upon their summits large round bunches of a bright crimson berry: when the plantation is close, domes of extreme beauty appear scattered over the surface of the country... At Zayla I had been informed that elephants are “thick as sand” in Harawwah: even the Gudabirsi, when at a distance, declared that they fed there like sheep, and, after our failure, swore that they killed thirty but last year."

Richard Francis Burton (1856) describes what he feels is the end of his journey when he witnesses the blue hills of Harar, which is the iconic backdrop of the Harrawa Valley in his book First Footsteps in East Africa:

"Beyond it stretched the Wady Harawwah, a long gloomy hollow in the general level. The background was a bold sweep of blue hill, the second gradient of the Harar line, and on its summit closing the western horizon lay a golden streak--the Marar Prairie. Already I felt at the end of my journey."

Captain H.G.C Swayne R.E. (1895) describes the Harrawa Valley, in his book Seventeen Trips Through Somaliland:

"On 5th September we descended into the Harrawa Valley in the Gadabursi country, and back on to the high ban again at Sarír, four days later. We then marched along the base of the Harar Highlands, reaching Sala Asseleh on 13th September. We had experienced heavy thunder-storms with deluges of rain daily, and had found the whole country deserted."

Captain H.G.C Swayne R.E. (1895) describes the Harrawa Valley as extremely strategic, in his book Seventeen Trips Through Somaliland:

"The position of the Samawé ruins would favour a supposition that some power holding Harar, and having its northern boundary along the hills which wall in the southern side of the Harrawa valley, had built the fort to command the Gáwa Pass, which is one of the great routes from the Gadabursi country up on to the Marar Prairie."

Captain H.G.C Swayne R.E. (1895) describes the areas near and around the Harrawa Valley, in his book Seventeen Trips Through Somaliland:

"The extreme north-western angle of the Marar Prairie is marked by a hill called Sarir Gerad, and from its base the ground falls abruptly to the north into the Harrawa Valley in the Gadabursi country, and to the west into deep gorges which lead towards Gildessa."

C. E. Gouldsbury (1915) describes exploring the areas near and around the Harrawa Valley in search for elephants, in his book Tiger Slayer by Order:

”We now struck camp, and marching through an unexplored portion of the Gadabarsi country towards the Harawa Valley, camped at Leakat, whence I sent mounted men in all directions in search of khubbar of elephants. But before going on to relate my adventures, I must tell of an incident which had come perilously near to ending my expedition.”

Drake-Brockman M.R.C.S. Eng./L.R.C.P. Lond. (1914) describes the springs in the Harrawa Valley:

"In the same manner the springs at Bihendula, Armaleh, Daraas, Shamahaleh, Upper Sheikh and Harawa in the Gudabirsi country, only to mention a few of those that recur to the writer, might easily be dealt with and at no very great cost."

== Demographics ==
The Harrawa Valley is inhabited by the Bahabar Cabdale, Makayl-Dheere, Jibriil Yoonis and Habar Cafaan subclans of the Gadabuursi Dir clan.
