= Gadabuursi Ughazate =

1575 to 1884 Northern Somali kingdom

Gadabuursi Ughazate Ugaasyada ama Boqortooyada Gadabuursi
- 1575/1607–1884
- Common languages: Somali · Arabic ·
- Religion: Sunni Islam; Shafi'i; Qadiriyya
- Government: Monarchy
- Ughaz
  - ~1575: Ughaz Ali Makail Dera
- History
  - Established: 1575/1607
  - Disestablished: 1884
Succeeded by
British Somaliland; Ethiopian Empire
- Today part of: Ethiopia; Somaliland

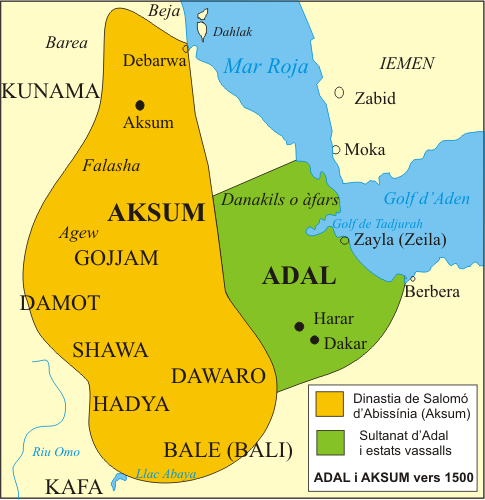
The Adal Sultanate which was largely on part of the Gadabuursi territory and the conquest of Abyssinia which they contributed to.

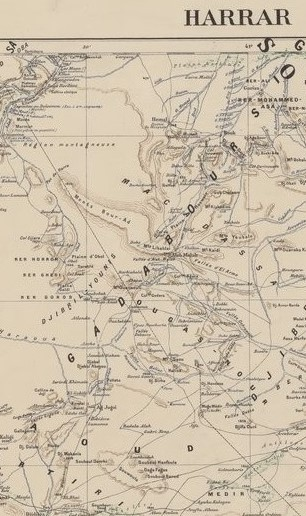
Ughaz Nur's dominion in the Harar Region

The Gadabuursi Ughazate or Ugasate (Somali: Ugaasyada ama Boqortooyada Gadabuursi, Amharic: የገዳቡርሲ አለቆች) evolved from and was a successor kingdom to the Adal Sultanate and Sultanate of Harar. The first Ughaz (Ugaas) of this successor kingdom, Ali Makail Dera (Cali Makayl-Dheere) was the son of Makail Dera, the progenitor of the Makayl-Dheere. During the late 19th century, as the region became subject to colonial rule, the Ughaz assumed a more traditional and ceremonial leadership of the clan. The Gadabuursi give their King the title of Ughaz. It's an authentic Somali term for King or Sultan. The Gadabuursi in particular are one of the clans with a long tradition of the institution of Sultan.

== History ==
The first Ughaz of the Gadabuursi was Ughaz Ali Makail Dera (Cali Makayl-Dheere), who is the progenitor of the Reer Ughaz (Reer Ugaas) subclan to which the royal lineage belongs.

Ughaz Ali Makail Dera (Cali Makayl-Dheere) who was born in 1575 in Dobo, an area north of the present town of Borama in north-western Somaliland, is recorded as having inflicted a heavy defeat on Galla forces at Nabadid.

I. M. Lewis (1959) highlights that the Gadabuursi were in conflict with the Galla during the reign of Ughaz Ali Makail Dera, during and after the campaigns against the Christian Abyssinians:

"These campaigns were clearly against the Christian Abyssinians, but it appears from the chronicle that the Gadabursi were also fighting the Galla. A later leader of the clan, Ugas 'Ali Makahil, who was born in 1575 at Dobo, north of the present town of Borama in the west of the British Protectorate, is recorded as having inflicted a heavy defeat on Galla forces at Nabadid, a village in the Protectorate."

Ughaz Nur I, who was crowned in 1698, married Faaya Aale Boore who was the daughter of a famous Oromo King and Chief, Aale Boore. Ughaz Nur I and Faaya Aale Boore gave birth to Ughaz Hiraab and Ughaz Shirdoon, who later became the 6th and 7th Ughaz respectively. Aale Boore was a famous Oromo King, the victory of the former over the latter marked a historical turning point in concluding the Oromo predominance in the Eastern Hararghe region.

The Gadabuursi managed to defeat and kill the next Oromo King after Aale Boore during the reign of Ughaz Roble I who was crowned in 1817. It is said that during his reign the Gadabuursi tribe reached great influence and tremendous height in the region, having managed to defeat the reigning Galla/Oromo King at that time whose name was Nuuno which struck a blow to the Galla's morale, due to their much loved King being killed. He was defeated by Geedi Bahdoon, also known as Geedi Malable. He struck a spear right through the King while he was in front of a tree, the spear pierced inside the tree making it not able for the King to escape or remove the spear. After he died he was buried in an area that's now called Qabri Nuuno near Sheedheer. In the picture already shared titled 'An old map featuring the Harrawa Valley in the Gadabuursi country, north of Harar' one can read Gabri Nono, which is the anglicized version of the Somali Qabri Nuuno.

Ughaz Roble I died in 1848 and was buried in an area called Dhehror (Dhexroor) in the Harrawa Valley. It has become the custom for Somalis after Ughaz Roble I that whenever an Ughaz gets inaugurated and it rains, he should be named Ughaz Roble, which translates to 'the one with rain' or 'rainmaker'.

Ughaz Nur II was born in Zeila in the year 1835 and crowned in Bagi in 1848. In his youth, he loved riding, hunting and the traditional arts and memorized a great number of proverbs, stories and poems.

Eventually, Ughaz Nur II created his own store of sayings, poems and stories that are quoted to this day. He knew by heart the Gadabuursi heer (customary law) and amended or added new heer during his reign. He was known for fair dealing to friend and stranger alike. It is said that he was the first Gadabuursi Ughaz to introduce guards and askaris armed with arrows and bows.

During the rule of Ughaz Nur II both Egypt and Ethiopia were contending for power and supremacy in the Horn of Africa. The European colonial powers were also competing for strategic territories and ports in the Horn of Africa.

In the year 1876, Egypt using Islam as a bargaining chip signed a treaty with Ughaz Nur II and came to occupy the Northern Somali coast which included Zeila. But the Egyptians also occupied the town of Harar and the Harar-Zeila-Berbera caravan route.

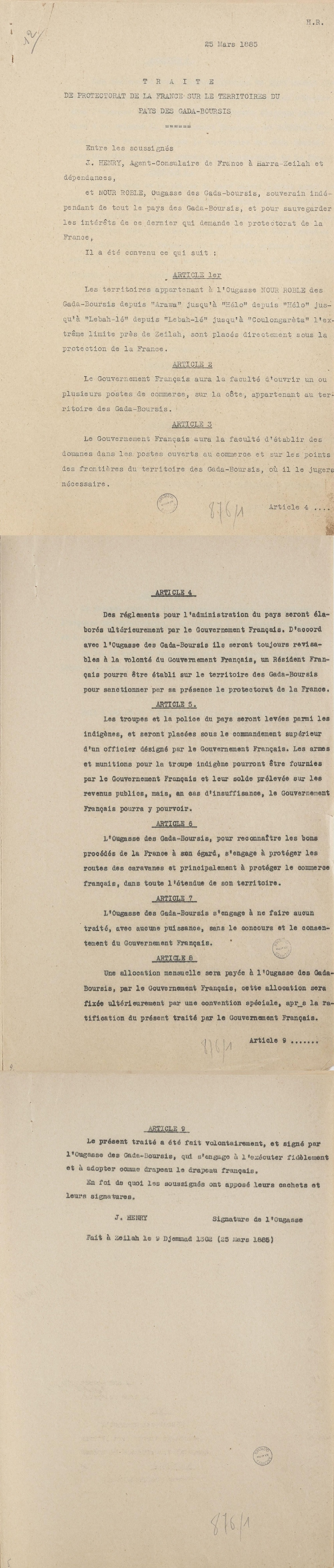
Protectorate Treaty between France and the Gadabuursi, signed at Zeila, 25 March 1885.

On 25 March 1885, the French government claimed that they signed a treaty with Ughaz Nur II of the Gadabuursi placing much of the coast and interior of the Gadabuursi country under the protectorate of France. The treaty titled in French, Traitè de Protectorat sur les Territoires du pays des Gada-Boursis, was signed by both J. Henry, the Consular Agent of France and Dependencies at Harar-Zeila, and Nur Robleh, Ughaz of the Gadabuursi, at Zeila on 9 Djemmad 1302 (March 25, 1885). The treaty states as follows (translated from French):

"Between the undersigned J. Henry, Consular Agent of France and Dependencies at Harrar-Zeilah, and Nour Roblé, Ougasse of the Gada-boursis, independent sovereign of the whole country of the Gada-boursis, and to safeguard the interests of the latter who is asking for the protectorate of France,

It was agreed as follows:

Art. 1st – The territories belonging to Ougasse Nour-Roblé of the Gada-boursis from "Arawa" to "Hélo" from "Hélô" to Lebah-lé", from "Lebah-lé" to "Coulongarèta" extreme limit by Zeilah, are placed directly under the protection of France.

Art. 2 – The French government will have the option of opening one or more commercial ports on the coast belonging to the territory of the Gada-boursis.

Art. 3 The French government will have the option of establishing customs in the posts open to trade, and on the points of the borders of the territory of the Gada-boursis where it deems it necessary. Customs tariffs will be set by the French government, and the revenues will be applied to public services.

Art. 4 – Regulations for the administration of the country will be elaborated later by the French government. In agreement with the Ougasse of the Gada-boursis they will always be revisable at the will of the French government, a French resident may be established on the territory of the Gada-boursis to sanction by his presence the protectorate of France.

Art. 5 – The troops and the police of the country will be raised among the natives, and will be placed under the superior command of an officer designated by the French government. Arms and ammunition for the native troops may be provided by the French government and their balance taken from the public revenues, but, in case of insufficiency, the French government may provide for them.

Art. 6 – The Ougasse of the Gada-boursis, to recognize the good practices of France towards it, undertakes to protect the caravan routes and mainly to protect French trade, throughout the extent of its territory.

Art. 7 – The Ougasse of the Gada-boursis undertakes not to make any treaty with any other power, without the assistance and consent of the French government.

Art. 8 – A monthly allowance will be paid to the Ougasse of the Gada-boursis by the French government, this allowance will be fixed later, by a special convention, after the ratification of this treaty by the French government.

Art. 9 – This treaty was made voluntarily and signed by the Ougasse of the Gada-boursis, which undertakes to execute it faithfully and to adopt the French flag as its flag.

In witness whereof the undersigned have affixed their stamps and signatures.

J.Henry

Signature of Ougasse

Done at Zeilah on 9 Djemmad 1302 (March 25, 1885)."

— Traité de protectorat de la France sur les territoires du pays des Gada-boursis, 9 Djemmad 1302 (March 25, 1885), Zeilah.

The French claimed that the treaty with the Ughaz of the Gadabuursi gave them jurisdiction over the entirety of the Zeila coast and the Gadabuursi country.

However, the British attempted to deny this agreement between the French and the Gadabuursi citing that that Ughaz had a representative at Zeila when the Gadabuursi signed their treaty with the British in December of 1884. The British suspected that this treaty was designed by the Consular Agent of France and Dependencies at Harrar-Zeila to circumvent British jurisdiction over the Gadabuursi country and allow France to lay claim to sections of the Somali coast. There was also suspicion that Ughaz Nur II had attempted to cause a diplomatic row between the British and French governments in order to consolidate his own power in the region.

According to I. M. Lewis, this treaty clearly influenced the demarcation of the boundaries between the two protectorates, establishing the coastal town of Djibouti as the future official capital of the French colony:

"By the end of 1885 Britain was preparing to resist an expected French landing at Zeila. Instead, however, of a decision by force, both sides now agreed to negotiate. The result was an Anglo-French agreement of 1888 which defined the boundaries of the two protectorates as between Zeila and Jibuti: four years later the latter port became the official capital of the French colony."

== Fall of Harar in 1887 ==
Ughaz Nur II went to Egypt and met Isma'il Pasha, the Khedive of Egypt, who honored him with medals and expensive gifts. The Ughaz there signed a treaty accepting Egyptian protection of Muslims in Somaliland and Ethiopia. According to I. M. Lewis, he was also gifted with firearms amongst other weapons. In 1884, two years after Britain took over Egypt, Britain also occupied Egyptian territories, especially the northern Somali coast. However Ughaz Nur II had little to do with the British, as long as they did not interfere with his rule, the customs of his people, and their trade routes. Ughaz Nur II had established strong relations with the Emir of Harar, Abdallah II ibn Ali. In 1887, when Harar was occupied by Menelik II of Ethiopia, Ughaz Nur II sent Gadabuursi askaris to support Abdallah II ibn Ali and in another historical account, he himself participated in the battle. Harar officially fell to Menelik in 1887.

Ughaz Nur II recited lines of poetry lamenting the fall of Harar to Menelik in 1887:

Tolkayow xalay taah ma ladin toosna maan qabine
Nimankaas Taagani waxay igu talaaleene
Togii Herer Axmaaraa dul tagay oo dilay dadkeeniye
Islaamkiina wuu wada tirtiray baa inoo timid eh
Taawooday oo xalay hurdadii tow ka soo idhiye

— Ughaz Nur II (Ugaas Nuur) Tolkayow
Translation:

My people, last night my moans did not leave me yet no ailment plagued me.
What those people have informed me regarding.
The Valley of Harar captured by the Abyssinians who killed our people.
Those who wiped out Islam have come to us.
Last night, sleep deprived, swiftly woken.

Ughaz Nur II was at first in a distinct and advantageous position, for not only did the caravan route to Harar run through Gadabuursi clan territory, but the Gadabuursi at the time were partly cultivating and so easier to control and tax. Yet for this very reason, after the 1897 Anglo-Egyptian Treaty, Ughaz Nur II, a far-sighted man, did everything in his power to prevent his people cultivating, for he realised that it would bring them under the control of the Amharic authority established at Harar. Colonel Stace (1893) mentioned that the Abyssinians were encroaching further into the Gadabuursi homeland near Harar:

“The Abyssinians from Harar are encroaching more and more upon the Gadabursi country, as I anticipated would be the result of their unopposed occupation of Biyo Kaboba. I fear that they will make a permanent settlement in the Harrawa Valley from whence the encroachments and exactions will extend further into the Protectorate.”

Ras Makonnen sent a letter to Colonel E. V. Stace complaining that the Gadabuursi have begun attacking all caravans coming into Harar and denied any plans to militarily attack the Gadabuursi:

"From - RAS MAKUNAN, Amir of Harrar and its Dependencies,

To COLONEL E. V. STACE, Political Agent and Consul, Somali Coast...

As for the Gadabursi, they are always molesting and looting the travellers who come to Harrar. This we do not hide from you. The doings of this tribe are much injurious and troublesome to all the people as they loot the travellers without cause. As regards what you wrote appertaining to an intended attack by some of our soldiers against them (Gadabursi), we are not aware of it because we were absent. Before taking such steps, we would consult you."

Ras Makonnen, the newly appointed Ethiopian governor of Harar, offered the Gadabuursi protection in exchange for collaboration. Ughaz Nur II refused and fought Ethiopian expansion until he died in 1898. Ughaz Nur II is buried in Dirri.

His work was and is still taught in Somali Poetry classes (Suugaan: Fasalka Koobaad) among other Somali poets. His poems were also written in the Gadabuursi Script.

For more about Ughaz Nur II, visit the following:

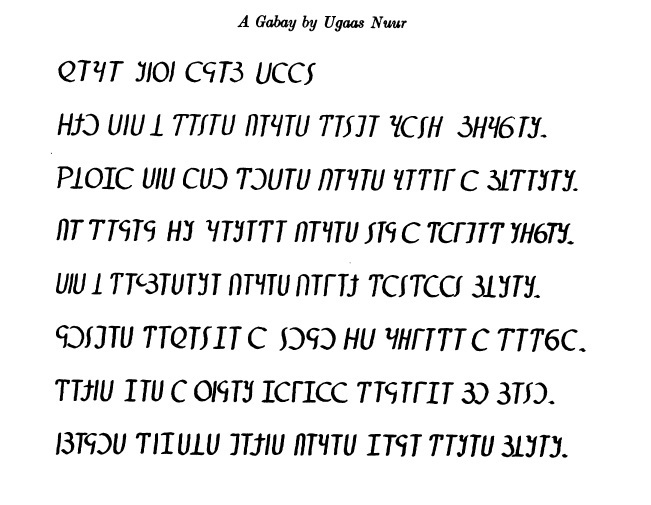
A poem by Ugaas Nuur in the Gadabuursi Script.

The image above translates as:

"Oh God! How often have I made a man hostile to me sleep in the front part of the house. How often have I allowed a man against whom my flesh turned to continue speaking. I am not hasty in dispute, how often have I shown forbearance. How often have I given a second helping of honey to the man who only waited to hurt me. When I turn the sewing machine and scatter the seeds of treachery (or trickery). The trap which I have prepared for him (my enemy) when he sets his chest on top of it. How often have I caught him unawares."

— Ughaz Nur II (Ugaas Nuur), Dissimulation

Translation of another variation of the poem by B. W. Andrzejewski (1993):

"If any man intended aught of villainy against me, by God, how snug I made my forecourt for his bed-mat, none the less! And if, with aggression in his thoughts, He pastured his horses to get them battle-fit, How in spite of this I made him griddle-cakes of maize to eat! Amiably I conversed with him for whom my body felt revulsion. I did not hurry, I was patient in dealing with his tricks. I showed a relaxed and easy mien, My looks gave no grounds for suspicion in his mind. Lips open, words betraying nothing of deceit, smiles, Laughter on the surface, not rising from the gullet's depth. In our game of shax I would make this move and that, And say, "This seems to be the one that's more to my advantage." I offered banter and engaged in well-turned talk, All the while setting a trap for him, Ready for the day when he would show his real intentions. I would flood him with deceit, while I arranged my plan of action. Then, when he was all unknowing and unwarned, O how I struck him down!"

— Ughaz Nur II (Ugaas Nuur), Dissimulation

Philipp Paulitschke (1893) mentioned a poem which became extremely popular in the Gadabuursi country called Imminent loss of the Prince. This poem became very popular when the Gadabuursi heard that the British intended to supplant the traditional line of Ughaz Nur II towards the end of his life and appoint a more favourable Ughaz, 'Elmi Warfa:

Ninkî donî-rarestaj,
Jjo damêro-karestaj,
Baldéjaj labada.
So ninkî bêjū durâja
Durdurka angurainin
Samarônka gudbanû !
Baldaijaj labadâso!
In kaijama d'adû,
Ugás Nûr kurbahâ ;
Au kofil nau bukhrada
Kadiro hanojêlin bukhrkî!
Wa Ugas Nûr uinkî dîdī jarâhā,
Amma dûga-kakêho
Rabbijo damkassî !

— Imminent loss of the Prince
Translation:

A man in charge of ships,
Another with just a lone donkey available for hire, Examine them both.
Moreover, one who fetches water
from a small puddle,
And another, drawing from
ever-flowing, robust streams,
O Samarôn, are they
all the same!
Just assess them both!
Today marks the end,
Ugâs Nûr shall pass away;
If someone,
merely a Foot binder, desires
to dominate us,
O Creator of the world, don't let him become our master!
Those who oppose Ugâs-Nûr
and speak ill of him,
O God, wipe them out completely!

Philipp Paulitschke (1893) comments on the above poem:

"This poem is an example of the improvisational art of the Somâl, Somâl girls were singing in the interior of the Gadaburssi country when it became known that Ugâs Nûr Roble, the old prince of the land, was imprisoned in Zeila and a great statesman of the tribe, Elmi Worfa appointed Ugâs of the Gadaburssi-Somâl by the British government."

Major R. G. Edwards Leckie writes about his meeting with Ughaz Nur II in his A Visit to the Gadabuursi:

"We were warned that he did not love the Feringi (white man), and therefore thought it better to send a messenger ahead to His Majesty and return with a confidential report on the situation."

Major R. G. Edwards Leckie also writes about his appearance:

"This old man was Ugaz Nur, King or Sultan of the Gadabursi. He had several other names which I do not remember now... Ugaz Nur was about seventy five years old. Although stiffened by age, he was tall, straight and well built. Even the weight of his many years could not alter the chief's graceful figure... His dress was simple and lacked the usual Oriental splendour. Many of his subjects were attired much more gaily, but none looked more distinguished. He wore a crinkly white tobe, with the end of which he covered his head, forming a hood. Over this he wore a cloak of black cloth lined with crimson silk, probably a present from the Emperor of Abyssinia. In his hand he carried a simple staff instead of the regulation shield and spear. His fighting days were over, and he now relied upon his stalwart sons to protect him on his journeys. As he shook hands with us he smiled pleasantly. His manner was composed and dignified, evidently inherited from his ancestors, who were rulers in the country for many generations."

Ughaz Roble II was the 12th in line of the Gadabuursi Ughazate. Based mainly in Harar, he was crowned the Ughaz of the Gadabuursi after his father's (Ughaz Nur II) death. His position as Ughaz proved to be quite controversial amongst the Gadabuursi due to his close relationship with the Ethiopian ruling dynasty. He would go on to receive payments, gifts and weapons from the British, the French and the Abyssinians who were all vying for the region. He eventually fell out of favor with the British and became close allies with Menelik II who officially recognized him as the Ughaz of the Gadabuursi.

When Lij Iyasu came to power in Abyssinia he cemented a close relationship with Ughaz Roble II and gave him a close female relative from the Ethiopian royal household in marriage.

The Arab Bureau, which was a collection of British intelligence officers headquartered in Cairo and charged with the task of coordinating imperial intelligence activities, recorded this event in the Arab Bureau Summaries Volumes 1-114 (1986), where it also mentioned that the British deposed Ughaz Roble II from power due to his alliance with the Ethiopian establishment:

"Lij Yasu has, however, given a female relative of his in marriage to the late Agaz of the Gadabursi, who was recently deposed by us for his intrigues and misgovernment."

Andrew Caplan (1971) records Lij Iyasu wanting to enter into an alliance with the Gadabuursi, in his book British policy towards Ethiopia 1909-1919:

“The Prince (Lij Iyasu) was also negotiating for an alliance with the Gadabursi Somali... He had given one of his relatives to its Ex-Ughaz Robleh Nur.”

After the deposition of his ally Lij Iyasu by Empress Zewditu, Ughaz Roble II witnessed the October 1916 massacre of the inhabitants of Harar by Abyssinian soldiers and was given immunity along with some of the other prominent leaders in the region. This event marked a turning point in the relations between the Somalis and the ruling Abyssinians in the region. Ughaz Roble II was given special immunity because of his high profile and personal relations with those in the Ethiopian royal family to whom he was also related by virtue of marriage. Ughaz Roble II was considered a very controversial figure and was the first Gadabuursi Ughaz to have been deposed by his own people. The deposition from position of Ughaz caused a huge stir amongst the Gadabuursi. Ughaz Roble II was known to love hunting, archery, horse riding and he inherited a rifle that was given as a gift to his father Ughaz Nur II by the Khedive of Egypt, Isma'il Pasha. He died in 1938 and was buried in Awbare, which became the seat of the Ughazate of the Gadabuursi in the early 20th century.

Ughaz 'Elmi Warfa was the 13th in line of the Gadabuursi Ughazate. His other names were 'Ilmi-Dheere ('Elmi the Tall) and Kun ‘Iil (A Thousand Sorrows).

In the late 1890s, the British appointed 'Elmi Warfa Ughaz of all the Gadabuursi in the British Protectorate. Ughaz 'Elmi thus supplanted the traditional line of Ughaz Nur II and his successor, Ughaz Roble II, who had fallen out of favor with the British. Ughaz 'Elmi's authority was recognized in an installation ceremony in 1917 in Zeila. However the traditional successor of Ughaz Nur II, Ughaz Robleh II, remained the Ughaz of the Gadabuursi in Ethiopia. Ughaz 'Elmi was a member of the delegation that had accompanied Ughaz Nur II to Egypt in the late 1870s and also was one of the Gadabuursi elders who signed the treaty with the British at Zeila in 1884.

Ughaz 'Elmi’s usurpation of the traditional Gadabuursi line of succession provoked other sub-clans and caused a lot of controversy. Many sub-clans, especially the rer Yunus or the Yunus branch felt it was their turn to vie for the Ughaz-ship. This sparked a conflict which was also conducted in poetic duels. These poems were rich imagery and symbolism. Two of the best are "Dhega Taag” (A Battle-Cry) by 'Elmi the Tall or 'Elmi Dheire' and the other called "Aabudle" (A Declaration of Faith) by Farid Dabi-Hay, who was one of Ughaz 'Elmi's rivals.

For more about Ughaz 'Elmi Warfaa, visit the following:

Early on in the Protectorate's history, the British government initially recognized Ughaz Roble II as the hereditary chief of the Gadabuursi. The Protectorate administration however discovered that Ughaz Roble II had accepted financial backing from the Ethiopian government. Consequently, the Protectorate replaced him with an alternative leader for the Gadabuursi, Ughaz 'Elmi Warfaa, who was officially crowned in Zeila in 1917 but ultimately wasn't able to attract Gadabuursi commodities away from Ethiopian jurisdiction into the Protectorate.

According to Cedric Barnes (2010), the British aimed to resolve this leadership division and secure their geopolitical interests by appointing Ughaz Roble II's son, Dodi, who was supported by several prominent Gadabuursi figures. These close associates to Dodi were strategically referred to by the British administration as "trade agents" with a specific economic objective:

The British appointed Ugaas Robleh’s son, Daudi, supported by other important Gadabuursi personalities. These adjuncts to Daudi were revealingly called ‘trade agents’ by the British, and their appointed task was to attract Gadabuursi goods and grain away from Ethiopian jurisdiction into the Protectorate.

This political maneuvering highlighted the competing spheres of influence between the British Protectorate and the Ethiopian administration over the jurisdiction and allegiances of the Gadabuursi clan. While the British utilized economic agents surrounding Dodi to divert regional commerce into their own territory, the Ethiopian government leveraged Ughaz Roble II's continued administrative cooperation to maintain an active, competing territorial and clan claim over the Gadabuursi.

Ughaz Dodi (Daudi) Ughaz Roble II, was also crowned Ughaz of the Gadabuursi in Ethiopia in the late 1940s and was appointed Dejazmach (Commander of the Gate) by the Ethiopian authorities. He soon turned his back on the British and became a source of constant problems for the British Protectorate and was accused of conspiring with Italian forces during World War II. After the war, British soldiers were sent to arrest him and he was eventually taken into custody whilst in Jijiga by the British and forcibly exiled to the Karaman Island in Yemen where he was imprisoned for 7 years. He was accompanied by his family in his forced exile. Ultimately he was released and when he returned to the British Protectorate he was immediately detained again on Saad-ud-Din Island, within the British governor's jurisdiction. The Gadabuursi recognized him as their Ughaz in a grand meeting of Gadabuursi notables in Ethiopia. After his return from forced exile, the Ethiopian government sent him a delegation informing him that Haile Selassie recognizes him as the Ughaz of the Gadabuursi in Ethiopia. Despite this, during the end of his life Ughaz Dodi refused to recognize Ethiopian rule and returned the Ethiopian delegation that was sent to him. In 1948, Ughaz Dodi signed a document called 'Petition for Amalgamation from the Jigjiga area, with the other Somali territories.' This document was primarily signed in order to petition the Four Power Commission of Investigation for the Former Italian Colonies (1948) to end Ethiopian occupation of Somali territories, return all Somali territories held by the Ethiopians and unify the territories under a United Somaliland. It was soon after this that he died in 1949.

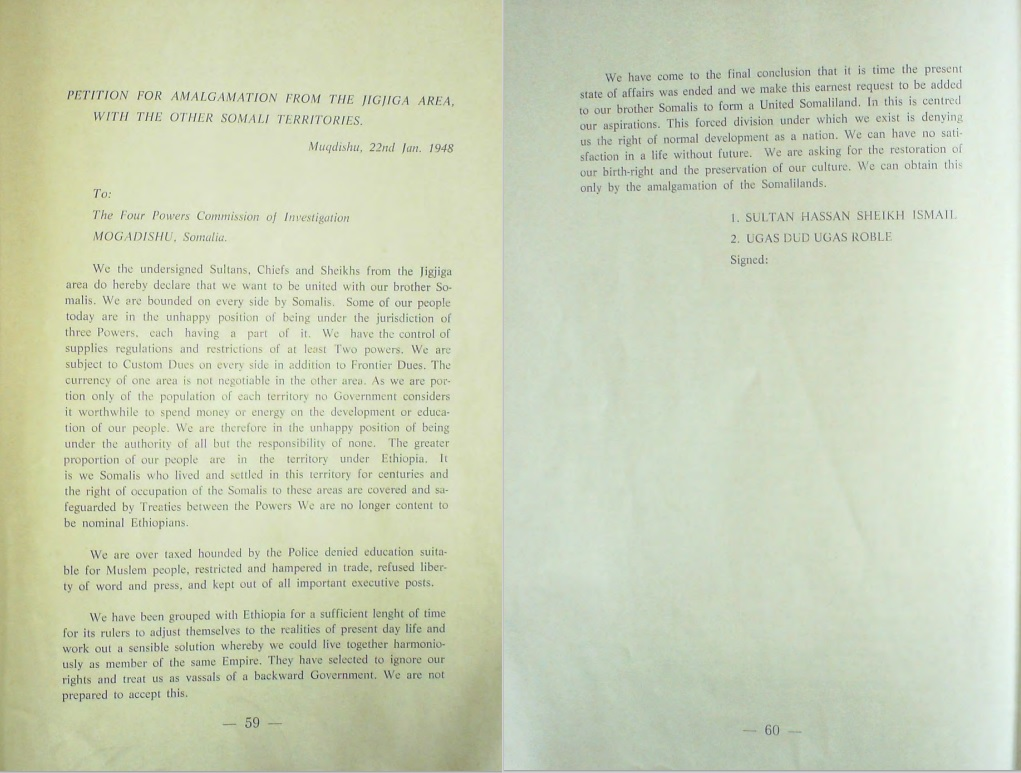
Petition for Amalgamation from the Jigjiga area, with the other Somali territories signed by Ughaz Dodi.

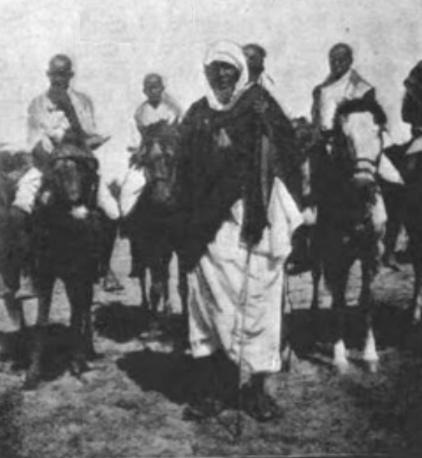
Ughaz Nur at an old age of around 75 years. Major Leckie states: Somewhat stiffened by age, He was tall, straight, and well built. Even the weight of his many years could not alter the King's graceful figure

== Administration ==
The Gadabuursi Kingdom was established more than 600 years ago and consisted of a King (Ugaas) and many elders.

Hundreds of elders used to work in four sections consisting of 25 elders each:

- Social committee
- Defense - policing authorities consisting of horsemen (referred to as fardoolay), foot soldiers and spear-men, but also askaris or soldiers equipped with poison arrows.
- Economy and collection of taxes
- Justice committee

The chairmen of the four sections were called Afarta Dhadhaar, and were selected according to talent and personal abilities.

A constitution, Xeer Gadabuursi, had been developed, which divided every case as to whether it was new or had precedents (ugub or curad).

The Gadabuursi King and the elders opposed the arrival of the British at the turn of the 20th century, but they ended up signing an agreement with them. Later, as disagreements between the two parties arose and intensified, the British installed a friendly Ugaas against the recognized traditional Ugaas in hopes of overthrowing him. This would eventually bring about the collapse of the kingdom.

=== Customary Law (Xeer) ===
==== The Law of the King and the 100 Men (Xeerka Boqorka iyo Boqolka Nin) ====
When a new Ughaz (Ugaas) was appointed amongst the Gadabuursi, a hundred elders, representatives of all the lineages of the clan, assembled to form a parliament to promulgate new Xeer agreements, and to decide which legislation they wished to retain from the reign of the previous Ugaas. The compensation rates for delicts committed within the clan were revised if necessary, and a corpus of Gadabuursi law, as it were, was placed on the statutes for the duration of the new Ugaas's rule.

This was called 'The Law of the King and the 100 men' (Xeerka Boqorka iyo Boqolka Nin).

Richard Francis Burton (1856) describes the Gadabuursi Ugaas as hosting equestrian games for 100 men in the Harrawa Valley, also known as the Harar Valley or Wady Harawwah, a long running valley situated in the Gadabuursi country, north of Harar, Ethiopia. He states:

"Here, probably to commemorate the westward progress of the tribe, the Gudabirsi Ugaz or chief has the white canvass turban bound about his brows, and hence rides forth to witness the equestrian games in the Harawwah Valley."

==== Traditional Gadabuursi installation ceremony ====
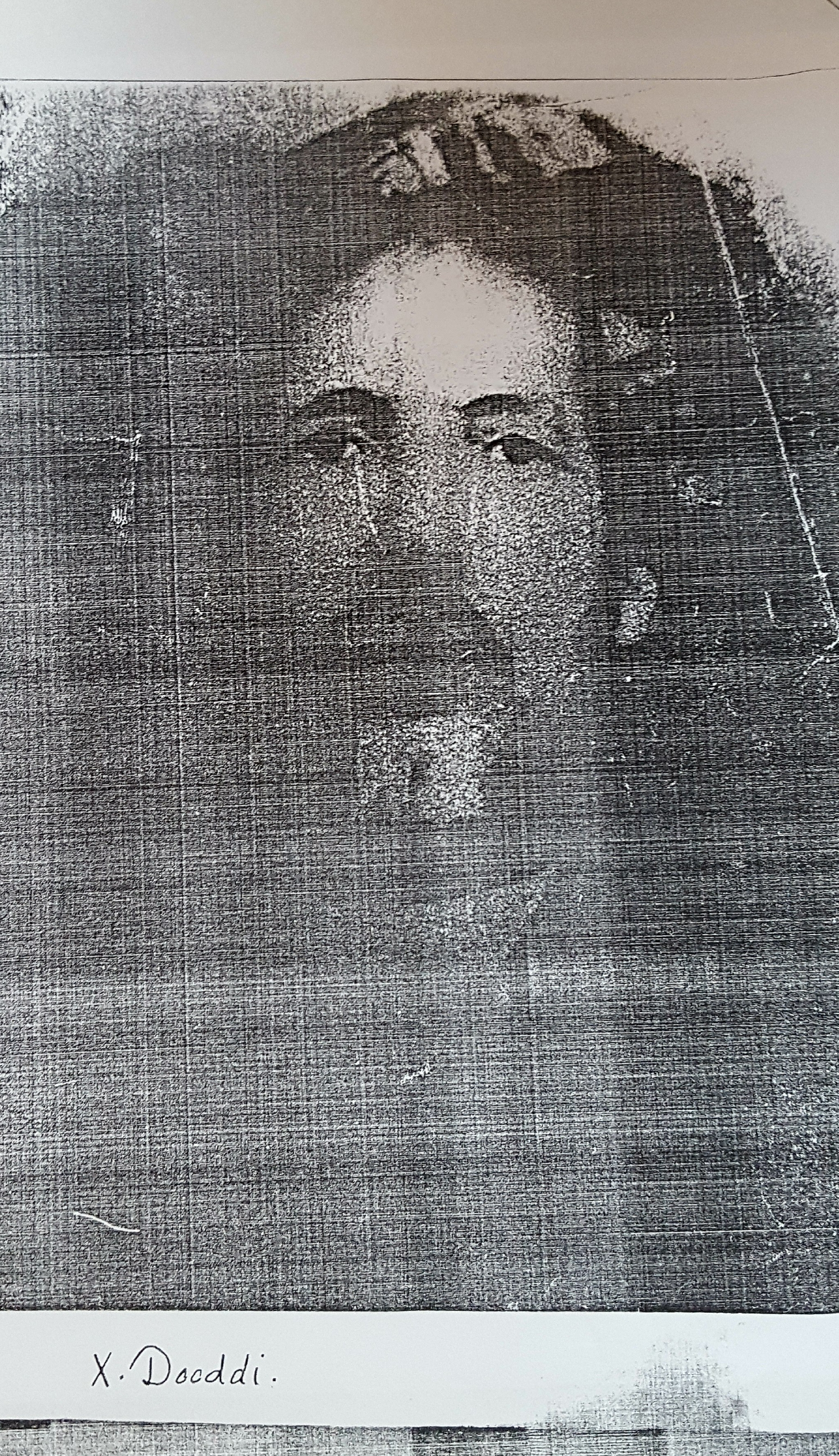
Ogas Dodi of the Gadabuursi (Samaron) tribe.

Here is a summary of a very full account of the traditional Gadabuursi installation ceremony mentioned by I. M. Lewis (1999) in A Pastoral Democracy:

"The pastoral Somali have few large ceremonies and little ritual. For its interest, therefore I reproduce here a summary of a very full account of the traditional Gadabuursi installation ceremony given me by Sheikh 'Abdarahmaan Sheikh Nuur, the present Government Kadi of Borama. Clansmen gather for the ceremony in a well-wooded and watered place. There is singing and dancing, then stock are slaughtered for feasting and sacrifice. The stars are carefully watched to determine a propitious time, and then future Ugaas is chosen by divination. Candidates must be sons or brothers of the former Ugaas and the issue of a woman who has been only married once. She should not be a woman who has been divorced or a widow. Early on a Monday morning a man of the Reer Nuur (the laandeer of the Gadabuursi) plucks a flower or leaf and throws it upon the Ugaas. Everyone else then follows his example. The man who starts the `aleemasaar acclamation must be a man rich in livestock, with four wives, and many sons. Men of the Mahad Muuse lineage then brings four vessels of milk. One contains camels' milk, one cows' milk, one sheeps' milk, and the last goats' milk. These are offered to the Ugaas who selects one and drinks a little from it. If he drinks the camels' milk, camels will be blessed and prosper, if he drinks, the goats' milk, goats will prosper, and so on. After this, a large four-year-old ram is slaughtered in front of him. His hair is cut by a man of the Gadabuursi and he casts off his old clothes and dons new clothes as Ugaas. A man of Reer Yuunis puts a white turban round his head, and his old clothes are carried off by men of the Jibra'iin... The Ugaas then mounts his best horse and rides to a well called Bugay, near Geris, towards the coast. The well contains deliciously fresh water. Above the well are white pebbles and on these he sits. He is washed by a brother or other close kinsman as he sits on top of the stones. Then he returns to the assembled people and is again acclaimed and crowned with leaves. Dancing and feasting recommence. The Ugaas makes a speech in which he blesses his people and asks God to grant peace, abundant milk, and rain--all symbols of peace and prosperity (nabad iyo 'aano). If rain falls after this, people will know that his reign will be prosperous. That the ceremony is customarily performed during the karan rainy season makes this all the more likely. The Ugaas is given a new house with entirely new effects and furnishings and a bride is sought for him. She must be of good family, and the child of a woman who has had only one husband. Her bride-wealth is paid by all the Gadabuursi collectively, as they thus ensure for themselves successors to the title. Rifles or other fire-arms are not included in the bride-wealth. Everything connected with the accession must be peaceful and propitious."

== Leaders ==
	Name	Reign From	Reign Till	Born
1	Ughaz Ali Makail Dera	1607	1639	1575
2	Ughaz Abdi I Ughaz Ali Makail Dera	1639	1664	
3	Ughaz Husein Ughaz Abdi Ughaz Ali	1664	1665	
4	Ughaz Abdillah Ughaz Abdi I Ughaz Ali	1665	1698	
5	Ughaz Nur I Ughaz Abdi I Ughaz Ali	1698	1733	
6	Ughaz Hirab Ughaz Nur I Ughaz Abdi I	1733	1750	
7	Ughaz Shirdon Ughaz Nur I Ughaz Abdi I	1750	1772	
8	Ughaz Samatar Ughaz Shirdon Ughaz Nur I	1772	1812	
9	Ughaz Guleid Ughaz Samatar Ughaz Shirdon	1812	1817	
10	Ughaz Roble I Ughaz Samatar Ughaz Shirdon	1817	1848	
11	Ughaz Nur II Ughaz Roble I Ughaz Samatar	1848	1898	1835
12	Ughaz Roble II Ughaz Nur II Ughaz Roble I	1898	1938	
13	Ughaz Elmi Warfa Ughaz Roble I	1917	1935	1835 or 1853
14	Ughaz Abdi II Ughaz Roble Ughaz Nur II	1938	1941	
15	Ughaz Dodi Ughaz Roble Ughaz Nur	1948	1949	
16	Ughaz Roble III Ughaz Dodi Ughaz Roble	1952	1977	
17	Ughaz Jama Muhumed Ughaz'Elmi-Warfa	1960	1985	
18	Ughaz Abdirashid Ughaz Roble III Ughaz Dodi	1985	-	

Currently Abdirashid Ughaz Roble III Ughaz Dodi is the Ughaz of the Gadabuursi.
