= Kemal Hashi Mohamoud =

Ethiopian politician

Honorable Hon. Ato Kemal Hashi Mohamoud
- ከማል ሀሺ መሀሙድ
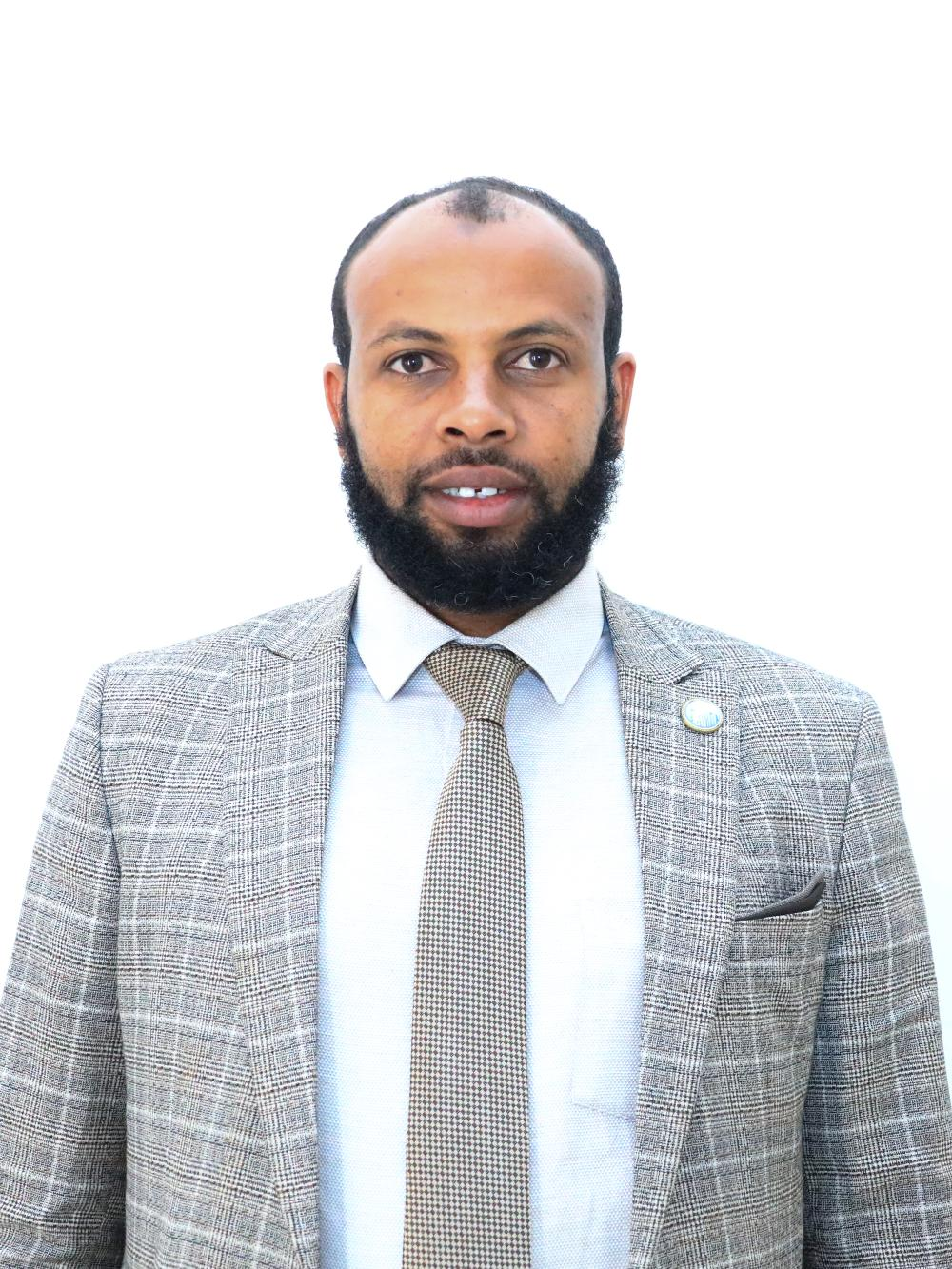
- Constituency: Arabi

Personal details
- Party: Prosperity Party
- Spouse: Ubah Abdikader
- Occupation: Member of Parliament of the House of Peoples' Representatives of the Federal Democratic Republic of Ethiopia and Member of the House's Advisory Committee.
- Profession: Lecturer
- Portfolio: Member of the House's Advisory Committee, Senior Advisor of the President, Member of the Ad hoc Committees of the House.

Kemal Hashi Mohamoud also Hon. Ato Kemal Hashi Mohamoud, is an Ethiopian politician and a Member of Parliament of the House of Peoples' Representatives of the Federal Democratic Republic of Ethiopia representing the Arabi Constituency under the ruling Prosperity Party. He is also a Member of the Parliamentary House's Advisory Committee.

== Overview ==
He hails from the Jibriil Yoonis subclan clan of the Gadabuursi and represents the Arabi Constituency which is an electoral region comprising the districts of Awbare, Harawo and Dembel. He succeeded Saharla Abdulahi Bahdon, also of the Jibriil Yoonis, who in turn won the Parliamentary seat representing Addis Ababa becoming the first Somali to become a Parliamentarian representing the capital.
