= Sulaiman Ahmed Gulaid =

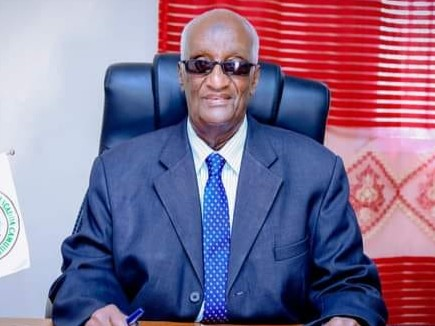
- Born: 1942 (age 83–84); Jaare, Hawd Reserve Area

Academic background
- Education: Emporia State University

Academic work
- Discipline: Educational psychology
- Institutions: Lafoole University; Amoud University

Sulaiman Ahmed Gulaid (Somali: Saleebaan Axmed Guuleed) is a Somaliland academic and educational administrator who is the co-founder at 1997 and served as the first president of Amoud University from 1997 to 2022.

== Biography ==
=== Early life ===
Relation map.

Around 1942, Sulaiman was born in Jaare, a village located in the Hawd Reserve Area. Suleiman's father came from a family of farmers. And his mother, Aasha Abdulle Haji Dalal, came from a family of camel herders, and she was born in Aware.

Sulaiman graduated from the elementary school in Awbare. In September 1959, he enrolled in Amoud High School that is now part of Amoud University. However, in 1960, Sheikh High School opened, and many students from Amoud School were transferred to them.

In 1964, Sulaiman moved to the United States to pursue higher education at Emporia State University.

=== Teaching career ===
After graduation, Sulaiman returned to his home country and worked in education for seven years. He served as a teacher, deputy principal, and principal at Amoud High School. Following this period, the Ministry of Education of the Somali Government appointed Sulaiman as the director for secondary and technical schools.

He later transferred to Lafoole University at his own request. Since Lafoole University is a division of Somali National University, there are also sources that wrote he was active at Somali National University. He worked as a lecturer. He later advanced within the institution, serving as the head of the department of education and psychology. After that, he became the deputy dean and was eventually promoted to dean of the university. In 1975, he took a leave of absence from teaching to pursue specialized studies at the same university. He later returned to his teaching position at the university. He subsequently became involved in the field of humanitarian aid as an advisor to Lafoole University and to the United Nations High Commissioner for Refugees (UNHCR) in Mogadishu.

=== Ethiopia ===
After the Somali Civil War began, Sulaiman spent five or six years in Addis Ababa, Ethiopia. He actively worked alongside Dr. Abdul Majid Hussein to unify twelve distinct Somali organizations, leading the process that culminated in the formation of the Ethiopian Somali Democratic League (ESDL) in Dire Dawa.

=== Amoud University ===
In 1996, Sulaiman returned to Borama, and in 1997, together with other scholars, founded Amoud University. There were 60 students enrolled when the school opened. (Some sources state that the school opened in 1998 and initially consisted solely of the School of Business Administration, with 96 students.) This university became the first to be established nationwide after the civil war. In 1997, Sulaiman became the president of the university. The institution was small when he took over the leadership role.

In 2000, Sulaiman welcomed the first group of fifteen students from outside Borama to Amoud University. Despite the tight budget constraints faced by the university, he prioritized their higher education and future. Sulaiman rented a large house in the Shacab neighborhood to provide them with accommodation for their studies.

As of March 2002, there were seven university professors, including Sulaiman. The university was governed by a faculty council and a board of trustees that included clan elders, and the president was appointed by the citizens for a two-year term.

In July 2012, Sulaiman announced that Amoud University would establish master’s and doctoral programs.

In March 2015, the president of Somaliland, Ahmed Mohamed Mohamoud (Silanyo), issued a presidential decree to establish the management committee for the Academy of Science and Arts. Sulaiman was appointed as one of the thirteen committee members. committee to develop strategic plans to attain full international recognition and to provide advisory support regarding the bilateral roadmap dialogues between Somaliland and Somalia.

In February 2016, President Silanyo issued a presidential decree appointing 18 members to a national committee tasked with seeking recognition of the Republic of Somaliland. The Minister of Foreign Affairs served as chair, and Sulaiman was named as the 11th member.

In June 2017, Ali Khalif Galaydh, President of Khatumo State, who had reached a reconciliation agreement with the Somaliland government, visited Borama. Ali Khalif Galaydh was one year ahead of Sulaiman at Amoud High School and met with Sulaiman during his visit.

In December 2019, Sulaiman criticized former Somaliland ministers who had done nothing during their terms in office but were making provocative statements to the public after leaving office.

In August 2022, Sulaiman stepped down as president of Amoud University after serving in that role for 25 years.

=== Later life ===
In May 2023, a Somaliland Coast Guard officer was killed by his superior in Borama. The superior was sentenced to death. Meanwhile, protests broke out against the killer. The protests escalated into violence and vandalism. Rumors spread on social media that prominent figures, such as Sulaiman, were being targeted for assassination. Somaliland’s Minister of the Interior stated that the riots were instigated by outsiders unrelated to the murder case and that they were expected to be arrested shortly; he also criticized those spreading irresponsible rumors.

In September 2025, Sulaiman was honored during the twenty-third annual graduation ceremony at Amoud University. The institution recognized his decades of service and conferred upon him the title of Professor Emeritus of Educational Leadership and Governance.

== His students ==
- Muse Bihi Abdi - A former president of Somaliland.
- Ismail Mumin Are - A former minister of justice of Somaliland.
- Zamzam Abdi Adan - A former minister of finance of Somaliland.
- Abdiaziz Mohamed Samale - A former minister of finance of Somaliland.

== Personal life ==
Sulaiman married Safiya Haji Abubakar, the daughter of a clan elder who worked on peacebuilding in Somaliland. He has four children, including their eldest son, Cabdiwahaab, and three daughters, named Hodan, Hibo, and Nimco.
