= Jaare =

Jaare جاري
- Town
- Location in Ethiopia
- Coordinates: 9°41′25.1″N 42°45′51.8″E
- Country: Ethiopia
- Region: Somali Region
- District: Awbare, Fafan Zone
- Time zone: UTC+3 (EAT)
- Climate: BSh

Jaare or Jarre (Somali: Jaare, Arabic: جاري), is a town located in the western Fafan Zone in the Somali region of Ethiopia in the Awbare district.

== Demographics ==
The town is primarily inhabited by the Abokor subclan of the Makayl-Dheere branch of the Gadabuursi Dir clan.

Filipo Ambrosio (1994) describes Jaare as being predominantly Gadabuursi:

"Jarso and Geri then sought refuge on 'neutral' adjacent Gadabursi territory in Heregel, Jarre and Lefeisa."
