= Gogti =

Gogti Gocti
- Town
- Location in Ethiopia
- Coordinates: 10°04′35″N 42°51′33″E
- Country: Ethiopia
- Region: Somali Region
- District: Awbare, Fafan Zone
- Time zone: UTC+3 (EAT)
- Climate: BSh

Gogti (also spelled: Gocti), is a town located in the Fafan Zone in the Somali region of Ethiopia. It lies near the border with the Sitti Zone.

== Demographics ==
The town and the surrounding region is primarily inhabited by the Reer Dudub of the Jibriil Yoonis subclan of the Gadabuursi Dir clan.

Adele Galipo (2018) states that Gogti was built around an already existing water source belonging to the shepherds of the Reer Dudub subclan of the Gadabuursi Dir clan:

"Gogti, located at the Somali-Ethiopian border and founded in 1928 by two brokers of the Reer Dudub lineage working for a merchant of the same lineage located in Zeyla. The village was built around a water source for the shepherds of the Reer Dudub."
