= Omar Osman Rabe =

Somali scholar, writer and politician

Omar Osman Rabe عسمان عمررابي

Personal details
- Born: 1946 Dembel, Ethiopia
- Died: 17 April 2013 (aged 66–67) Cairo, Egypt
- Occupation: Politician, scholar

Omar Osman Rabe (Somali: Cumar Cismaan Raabi) was a Somali scholar, writer, politician and pan-Somalist of the former Cote Francaise des Somalis or French Somaliland and the Republic of Djibouti. He was born in Dembel in the Shinile region of Ethiopia in 1946 and died in Cairo, Egypt in 2013.

== Biography ==
Omar Osman Rabeh was raised under the French colonial rule and started his struggle against the French at an early age. He was a Somali politician and a pan-Somalist, he joined the "Parti Du Mouvement Populaire (PMP)" in 1960.

Accused of having participated in an assassination attempt against the French appointed Prime Minister, Ali Aref Bourhan on 6 May 1968, he was sentenced to death on 27 May 1968. Although on 27 November 1968 his execution sentence was commuted to life imprisonment. He was transferred in December 1968 to the "Centre de détention de Muret" in Haute-Garonne, in the region of Occitanie. in France.

After spending 7 years in the "Centre de détention de Muret", the French jail, he was later traded for the French Ambassador to Somalia, John Gueury who was kidnapped by the "Front de libération de la Côte des Somalis" (FLCS), the French Somali Coast Liberation Front. While in jail, he achieved a PhD degree in philosophy from the University of Toulouse in 1979.

Later on he moved to Djibouti, and became the director of the "l'École normale" in 1980. He also partook in the training of the "Parti Populaire Djiboutien" (PPD) in 1981, then moved to Somalia in 1982. Eventually he moved to France and then Canada. He published his autobiography, Le Cercle et la spirale in 1984, shortly after he was stripped of his Djiboutian citizenship.

He returned to Djibouti in the 2000s, where he became a presidential adviser and head of the research center "de l'institut de géopolitique au Centre d'études et de recherche de Djibouti" (CERD).

He devoted his time to seeking Somali unity and to educate young Somalis, in Ottawa, Canada he founded "L'ecole Ibn Battouta", a French Immersion Islamic school. The school is considered to be one of the best and serves the Muslim community. Omar Osman Rabe also authored many books and articles on Somali culture, psychology and nationalism.

In a series of videos published on YouTube on October 24, 2019, Omar Rabeh’s wife claims that he was never able to obtain Canadian citizenship, his country of residence. At the time, Djibouti, under the leadership of Hassan Gouled, had placed him on a list of persons of interest and had alerted the Canadian Refugee Status Determination Division, accusing him of participating in militia and terrorist activities. Although he eventually won his case and Canada granted him residency, these persistent suspicions prevented him from acquiring citizenship, leaving him stateless.

She also testifies about the treatment Omar Rabeh received from Ismaïl Omar Guelleh at the end of his life. She explains that Rabeh had requested that the seven years he spent in prison in France, for his pro-independence activities, be taken into account when calculating his retirement pension. His request was denied, accompanied by the explicit response: ‘You’re not seriously asking me that.’”

Feeling exhausted and unwell, he requested to be evacuated out of the country. However, despite his status as a presidential advisor and submitting multiple properly acknowledged requests for an audience, he received only rejection. Eventually, he traveled to Cairo for medical treatment. During his convalescence in Egypt, his salary was suspended.

After his death, envoys sent on the orders of Ismaïl Omar Guelleh took turns pressuring his wife to organize the funeral in Djibouti, promising her a state funeral. These envoys included representatives from the Somali embassy in Egypt, the Djiboutian embassy, Somali personalities present in Egypt, and even members of his wife’s own family.

Upon the arrival of the body at Djibouti’s airport, orders from Ismaïl Omar Guelleh were given to conceal the corpse from public view and prevent any gathering. Rabeh was buried in the utmost secrecy at the PK12 cemetery. No tribute or official announcement of his death was made by the authorities in the media.

== Publications ==
- Le Cercle et la spirale, Paris, Les Lettres libres, 1984.
- République de Djibouti ou roue de secours d’... Éthiopie, Ivry, Ateliers Silex, 1985.
- L’État et le pansomalisme, Paris, Le Derwish, 1988.
- The Somali nation, III : the state and society, theorical considerations, Paris : Seecop, 1985.
- The Somali nation, 2 : present-day considerations and questions as the future : nomadism and technology, 1984
- The Somali nation : historical considerations and issues for the future, Aulnay-s-bois 1983.
- Somalia : psychology of the nomad, 1983.
- La mentalité nomade ou l'Antinomie état/clans, Djibouti, RDD : Institut d'études politiques et stratégiques (IEPS), 2010.
- The Somali Nomad, Hamburg, 1983
- Examen de conscience et autocritique philosophiques : Liberté et prison, Toulouse2: 1979.
