= Lefe Isa =

Lefe Isa Lafaciise (Somali)
- Location within Ethiopia
- Coordinates: 9°36′34″N 42°58′50″E
- Country: Ethiopia
- Region: Somali Region
- District: Awbare, Fafan Zone

Government
  - Type: Democratic
  - Mayor: Filsan Ahmed
- Elevation: 1,609 m (5,279 ft)
- Time zone: UTC+3 (EAT)

Lefe Isa (Somali: Lafaciise) is a town in eastern Ethiopia. Located in the Fafan Zone of the Somali Region. It is administered under the Awbare district.

== Demographics ==
The town is inhabited by the Reer Mohamuud and Reer Faarah subclans of the Jibriil Yoonis and the Habar 'Affan subclan, both branches of the Gadabuursi Dir clan.

Filipo Ambrosio (1994) describes Lefe Isa as being predominantly Gadabuursi:

"Jarso and Geri then sought refuge on 'neutral' adjacent Gadabursi territory in Heregel, Jarre and Lefeisa."
