= Amoud University =

Public university in Somalia

Coordinates: 9.945°N 43.223°E

- Jaamacadda Camuud
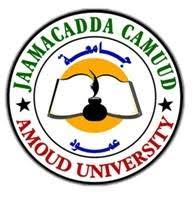
- Motto: A vehicle for peace and development.
- Type: Public
- Established: 1998
- President: Dr. Mohamed Muse Jibril, PhD
- Vice-president: Ahmed Abdillahi Boqore (Administration and Finance); Mohamed Mahamud Jama (Public Relations and Extra Curricular); Prof. Hamud Ibrahim Barkhdle (Academic Affairs)
- Academic staff: 238
- Students: 5111 (2020/2021)
- Undergraduates: 4599 (2020/2021)
- Postgraduates: 512 (2020/2021)
- Location: Borama, Awdal, Republic of Somaliland
- Campus: Main Campus located Amoud valley Borama city
- Colors: Green and white
- Sporting affiliations: Football, Olympics
- Website: Amoud University

Amoud University (Somali: Jaamacadda Camuud) is a comprehensive public university, located in the city of Borama in Somaliland.

The university started in 1998 with 66 students in two faculties (Education and Business Administration), and three teachers. It has a student population of 5,111 enrolled in 14 faculties/schools, 238 teaching staff.

The first batch of medical graduates came out in June 2007 and their final exams were supervised by King's College of London, United Kingdom, which provides the curriculum and teaching assistance to the Amoud University College of Health Sciences.

== Academic year ==
The university operates according to a semester system, and the academic year begins in September and ends in July. There is a brief one-month break after the first semester, and two months of holiday at the end of the academic year.

== Undergraduates and staff ==
As of 2020/2021, Amoud University has a student population of 5,111, and includes students from all Somali-speaking territories. The university's teaching staff consists of 238 instructors.

== Faculties and curricula ==
As of 2020/2021, the university consists of fourteen faculties/schools offering postgraduate degrees, bachelor's degrees, as well as two-year diploma and certificate programs. Each faculty or school formulates its academic program within the university's general regulations.

== History ==
The idea to establish Amoud University came from four intellectuals working in the Gulf in 1994 and was formally proposed in a workshop held in Borama on August 6, 1996. The workshop agreed to the proposal and adopted a resolution for the establishment of the university by 1997. Sulaiman Ahmed Gulaid served as the first president.

Amoud University started its first admission examination in September 1997 and selected 66 students to undergo a nine-month intensive English course. The university commenced its undergraduate program on 4 November 1998 and admitted the first freshman class.

Amoud University was formally launched in 1998 and is registered as a non-governmental, non-profit making institution. Amoud is an institute which is deeply rooted within the local community due to primary support for the establishment of Amoud coming from community elders, leaders, business people, concerned citizens and local non-governmental organizations.

In 2003, Amoud University signed a project agreement with the EC/DANIDA/CfBT for teacher training in the Education department. The two-year Diploma Education Program was funded by EC and DANIDA through UNESCO and CfBT.

== Faculties ==
The university consists of fourteen faculties/schools which offer master's degrees, Bachelor's degrees, two years diploma and certificate programs:

Student population for the 2020/2021 academic year
Faculties/schools/departments	Male	Female	Total
Department of Freshman Studies	872	483	1355
Faculty of Sharia and Law	129	60	189
Faculty of Agriculture and Environment	152	43	195
Faculty of Engineering	310	12	322
Faculty of Computing and ICT	340	95	435
Faculty of Education	217	14	231
Faculty of Business and Public Administration	360	283	643
Faculty of Economics and Political Science	95	20	115
School of Postgraduate Studies and Research	351	161	512
School of Medicine	174	107	281
School of Pharmacy	26	36	62
School of Dentistry	108	34	142
School of Nursing and Midwifery	10	191	201
School of Public Health and Nutrition	88	149	237
School of Medical Laboratory Technology	110	81	191
Total	3342	1769	5111
Percentage	65.40%	34.60%	100.0%

== Amoud University ==
=== Amoud Valley ===
The university's main campus is in Amoud Valley which is located 4.5 kilometers east of Borama, Somaliland, on the grounds of the former Amoud Secondary School which was established in 1952.

The faculties on the campus are as follows:

- Faculty of Education
- Faculty of Business and Public Administration
- Faculty of Computing and ICT
- Faculty of Agriculture and Environment
- Faculty of Engineering
- Faculty of Economics and Political Science

=== College of Health Sciences ===
The College of Health Sciences is situated in Borama town, west of Rays Hotel and next to the Allaale Hospital, where medical students perform their practical sessions.

The faculties on the campus are as follows:-

- School of Dentistry
- School of Nursing and Midwifery
- School of Medicine and Surgery
- School of Public Health
- School of Laboratory Technology
- School of Pharmacology

== Admission ==
Admission to the university is based on competitive examination. Candidates who have obtained an adequate passing grade in their secondary school exit tests are eligible for the admission examination that is held each July. Candidates from abroad who have matriculated under different educational systems are evaluated by the Admissions Committee on a case-by-case basis.

== Academics ==
=== Agriculture and environment ===
The faculty has microbiology, biochemistry and soil labs. The library of the faculty holds text books on almost all the subjects of agriculture.

=== Business and public administration ===
The Faculty of Business and Public Administration is one of the thirteen faculties of Amoud University. It is located at Amoud Valley, the university's main campus. The Faculty of Business and Public Administration along with the Faculty of Education was the first two faculties inaugurated on November 4, 1998.

The faculty offers the following programs

- Degree of Business Administration (stream Management and Accounting)
- Degree in Public Administration
- Degree in Project Management
- Diploma in Business Administration
- Diploma in Project Management

Local applicants who seek admission to Faculty of Business and Public Administration must pass the General Secondary School Leaving Examination conducted by the Somaliland Ministry of Education.

If there are more applicants than available vacancies, students with high grades will be given priority. Applicants who hold Secondary Education Certificates from recognized institutions in other countries will have their certificates evaluated and approved by the Academic Committee.

==== Graduation requirements ====
The credit hour per semester forms the basis of awarding a degree at the university. In order to be eligible for a degree, a student must earn successfully a minimum of 124 credit hours with an overall cumulative GPA (grade point average) of at least 2.00 and 2.50 for his major area in his field of specialization on a 4.00 point scale. In addition, he/she must also pass Amoud Comprehensive Exam (ACE) in his major area. That is, he/she must earn a minimum of GPA: 2.00 (overall), 2.50 (major area) and a pass grade for the ACE.

=== Computing and ICT ===
==== Programmes ====
This faculty offers two programmes: the Bachelor of Science in Information Technology, which is offered in the Information and Communication Technology department, and Bachelor of Business Information Technology, a joint collaborative programme offered in partnership with faculty of Business and Public Administration.

===== Bachelor of Information Technology (BIT) =====
The next intake will be at the start of the new academic year which shall commence on September 15, 2022. Its pioneer students graduated in August 2012.

===== Bachelor of Business Information Technology (BBI) =====
The programme was launched on September 15, 2012. The pioneer students for the programme are in their sophomore year. The department's office is located at the faculty of Computing and ICT. There are regular joint consultations between the Faculty and the Faculty of Business and Public Administration, Amoud University, regarding the curriculum, teaching and routine running.

===== Bachelor of Software Engineering (BSE) =====
The programme was launched on September 15, 2018. The first cohort of the BSE programme have just recently graduated in August 2021.

===== Bachelor of Telecommunication Engineering (ECE) =====
The programme was launched on September 15, 2019. The first cohort of the ECE programme are on schedule to graduate August 2022.

===== Diploma in Information Technology programme:- =====
This programme was launched in March 2014 and was offered part time in the evening sessions only. The next intake will be on September 15, 2022.

==== Target market is open to the following categories of people ====
for DIT.

- Those who have just cleared secondary school and want to pursue a quick course for a short period of time in the evenings.
- Those who are currently working in any other profession and wish to add some Information Technology strength to their curriculum vitae.

=== Education ===
The Faculty of Education was established in 1998 with the aim of producing qualified teachers and educationists. The faculty started with three lecturers and ten students. Now it is the largest faculty of the university and hosts 60 lecturers and 800 students.

The faculty has five departments: Biology, Chemistry, Physics, Mathematics, Social Studies and Languages.

=== Economics & Political Science ===
Faculty of Economics and Political Science (FEPS) was established on November 4, 1998, but due to growth and extension of the university FEPS was inaugurated as a separate Faculty of Economic & Political Science on October 23, 2012.

Programs:

- Bachelor's degree in Economics
- Bachelor's degree in Political Science

Applicants within Somaliland who seek admission to the Economics and Political Faculties must pass the General Secondary School Leaving Examination conducted by the Somaliland Ministry of Education. In addition, they must have a GPA of at least 2.00 in their freshman class at Amoud University. Applicants outside Somaliland must have a GCSE certificate from a recognized institution, and must have a GPA of not less than 2.00 in their freshman class here in Amoud University.

==== Graduation requirements ====
- The credit hour per semester forms the basis of awarding a degree at the university.
- In order to be eligible for a degree, a student must earn successfully a minimum of 124 credit hours with an overall GPA {Grade Point Average} of at least 2:00 and 2.5 for his major area.
- In addition, they must also pass Amoud Comprehensive Exam (ACE) for their major.

That is, they must:-

- Earn a minimum of GPA: 2.00 (overall)
- Obtain a minimum of GPA: 2.5 (major area)
- Obtain a Pass Grade (Amoud Comprehensive Examination)

=== Sharia and Law ===
The faculty of Sharia and Law was established in 2006.

=== Engineering ===
The faculty began offering four year engineering programmes on 15 September 2009.

==== Equipment ====
- Surfing instruments, electronic and manual
- Drawing special lab (for each student)
- Electrical installation lab.
