= Derwernache =

Derwernache Dharwanaaje (Somali)
- Town
- Location in Ethiopia
- Coordinates: 9°49′47.6″N 43°01′54.7″E
- Country: Ethiopia
- Region: Somali Region
- District: Awbare, Fafan Zone
- Time zone: UTC+3 (EAT)
- Climate: BSh

Derwernache (Somali: Dharwanaaje) is a town in eastern Ethiopia. Located in the Fafan Zone of the Somali Region, this town has an elevation of 1402 meters above sea level.

The UNHCR reports that in 2000 they assisted in the digging of a couple of relatively shallow wells at this settlement.

== Demographics ==
The inhabitants of this town are primarily of the Jibriil Yoonis clan of the Makahiil subclan of the Gadabuursi Dir clan.

Based on figures from the Central Statistical Agency in 2005, this town has an estimated total population of 135,645, of whom 102,327 are men and 33,318 are women. The 1997 census reported this town had a total population of 123,891 of whom 67,768 were men and 56,123 women. It is a major town in the Awbare district.
