= Sheder =

Sheder شيذير
- Town
- Location in Ethiopia
- Coordinates: 9°41′35″N 43°07′25″E
- Country: Ethiopia
- Region: Somali Region
- District: Awbare, Fafan Zone
- Time zone: UTC+3 (EAT)
- Climate: BSh

Sheder (Somali: Sheed-dheer, Arabic: شيذير), also known as Sheed-dheer meaning Looked far or Shedher, is a town located in the northeastern Fafan Zone in the Somali region of Ethiopia near the border with Somaliland on the main trade route between Jijiga and the sea. It is one of the largest towns in the Awbare district.

== Demographics ==
The town and surrounding region is primarily inhabited by the Aadan Yoonis subclan of the Gadabuursi Dir clan. The Aadan Yoonis clan has five major descendants including:

1. Hassan Aadan (Hassan Badhiile),
2. Abiib Aadan,
3. Abokor Aadan,
4. Boqorweyne Aadan and
5. Sayre Aadan.

== History ==
Sheder is an old town established in 1953. The Ethiopian Administration for Refugee and Returnee Affairs and the UNHCR together opened a new refugee camp at Awbare 13 July 2007. As of June 2012 13,553 individuals were resident at the camp, with a further 10,847 at the Sheder camp.

== Climate ==
The climate of Sheder is a subtropical highland climate (Köppen climate classification: Cwb). extremely wet and lush during rainy season, as with the rest of the Ethiopian highlands, Seasonal differences relate only to rainfall, as temperatures year round are cool to mild in the mornings and uniformly very warm though not hot during the afternoons. There are two rainy seasons: the main meher rains occur from July to September, and the short belg rains in April and May. The dry season, known as bega, is cooler by morning than the wet seasons due to lower cloud cover, but equally hot by afternoon though less humid.

== Ecology ==
The main economic source of the town is agriculture. For the land surveyed in this town and its surroundings, it is planted in cereals like teff, sorghum and maize, root crops, and vegetables. Permanent crops included lands planted in khat, and fruit trees. Farmers both raise crops and livestock, while some either grow crops or raise livestock.

There was extensive history of animal life in the past. For example, the area was earlier a habitat for the African wild dog, Lycaon pictus, although this canid is likely extirpated at present in the local area, due to an expanding human population. Also deer, horses, lions, cheetah, tigers, and many others currently almost non-existed due to increasing population residence were once up on a time inhabited the town and its surrounding serial of rocky mountains called in the local language "Weeranayaasha" meaning "The surrounded ones" due to their shape.
