= Dembel =

Place in Somali Region, Ethiopia

- Town
- Location within Ethiopia
- Coordinates: 9°48′N 42°36′E
- Country: Ethiopia
- Region: (Somali Region) Somali
- Zone: Shinile
- Woreda: Dembel
- Elevation: 1,333 m (4,373 ft)
- Time zone: UTC+3 (EAT)

Dembel is a town in central Ethiopia. Located in the Shinile Zone of the Somali Region. It is the administrative center of Dembel woreda.

== Overview ==
Inhabitants of this woreda have engaged in crop farming since 1965; however, there has been a great decline in crop production from 1989 to 2001. That was primarily caused by clan conflicts and aggravated by severe droughts. Between 35-45% of the inhabitants are pastoralists, while 55-65% raise cereals (mostly sorghum) as well as raise livestock.

== Demographics ==
This town is primarily inhabited by the Bahabar Cabdale, Makayl-Dheere, and Celi Makahil subclans of the Gadabuursi Dir clan family.

The Research-inspired Policy and Practice Learning in Ethiopia and the Nile region (2010) states that the Dembel district is predominantly Gadabuursi:

"Mainly Somali Gurgura, Gadabursi and Hawiye groups, who inhabit Erer, Dambal and Meiso districts respectively."
