= Amud =

Amud Amoud
- Archaeological site
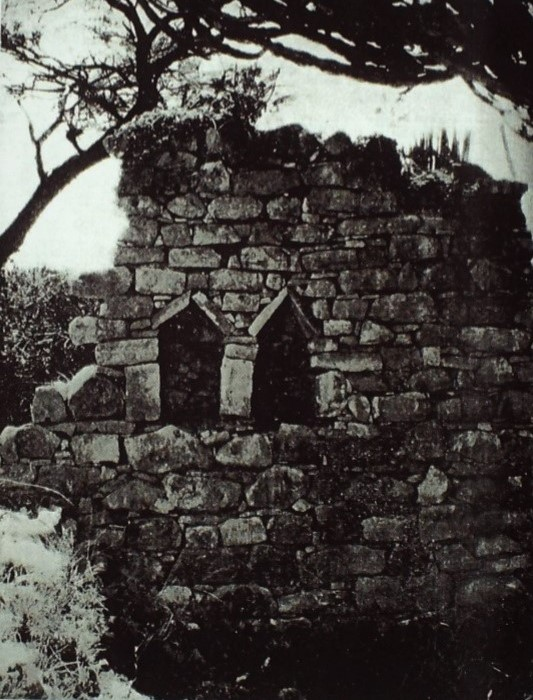
- Triangular headed niches in the wall of an old uninhabited house at Amud

- Location in Somaliland Amud (Somaliland)
- Coordinates: 9°59′57″N 43°13′56″E
- Country: Somaliland
- Region: Awdal
- Time zone: UTC+3 (EAT)

Amud or Amoud (Somali: Camuud, Arabic: عمود) is an ancient, ruined town in the Awdal region of Somaliland. Amud once served as one of the old capitals of the Adal Sultanate. Named after its patron Saint Amud, it was a center of activity during the Golden Age of the Adal Kingdom. The archaeological site is situated 1,000 metres (3,300 ft) above sea level, around 10 km southeast of the regional capital Borama. Archaeologist Jorge Rodriguez states that this town, similar to other ruins in the area, originates from around the 13th century and is associated with the Ifat and Adal Sultanates.

== History ==
British archaelogist and historian Gervase Mathew, F.S.A, described Amud as one of the old capitals of the Adal Sultanate:

"On the other hand the porcelain I have listed from site A is of finer quality than that from any other site that I have examined in East Africa -- except Amud far to the North, one of the old capitals of the Sultanate of Adal."

The historian G.W.B. Huntingford (1930) gives a detailed description of the ancient town in The town of Amud, Somaliland:

"The house are scattered around without any apparent plan; there are no streets and no trace of a surrounding wall. There is a mosque in the southern half of the dwelling area... [with a] rather oddly built mihrab facing the entrance... and immediately to the south... is the cemetery. There are upwards of two hundred houses, all well-built of stone [and] as much as 2.6m in height... The number of rooms ranges from two to four... there is sometimes no sign of an entrance to the inner rooms. This implies that entry was made from the roof, which was doubtless flat and reached by teps now vanished... There are many niches or cupboards in the inner walls."

Dr. A. G. Mathew (1956) who travelled to Amud attributed the history of the ancient settlement into two different periods as reported in his findings in the Somaliland Protectorate Report:

"The scattered ruins of the site at Amud cover an area of approximately 1½ miles in circumference. They would seem to belong to two different periods, Amud I and Amud II. It now seems possible to reconstruct much of the history of Amud II."

Dr. A. G. Mathew (1956) reports some of the valuabes that were discovered at the site:

"The site was deserted by the middle of the 19th century when Sir Richard Burton, passing from Zeila to Harar, heard of it as a ruined city. But it seems clear that it was still inhabited at least as late as the 18th century, for the fragments of Chinese porcelain found there include a broken plate with violet-toned sunflowers, which is almost certainly of the period of the Emperor Kiang Hsi (1662-1723) or of his successor, and broken bowls of the blue and white willow pattern commonly exported from 18th century China. There was also a considerable quantity of the currency beads used along the African coast and in the interior, some of which I am inclined to believe to be of European manufacture and not earlier than the beginning of the 19th century."

Dr. A. G. Mathew (1956) suggests there is strong evidence that Amud was a powerful trading settlement and a slave route from Harar to Zeila:

"Amud II was therefore a trading settlement. It lay between Aw Barreh and Abassa on the road from Harar to Zeila which was also the caravan route between the cities of the Upper Niger and the Gulf of Tajura. This was obviously a slave route and around the edge of the town there are remains of a number of large pens built roughly from stones placed loosely one upon the other without mortar; it seems probable that these were slave pens. Yet it is clear that Amud II was only a settlement in one part of an already ruined city (Amud I)."

Amud is situated over 1,000 m above sea level. The old town contained over 200 houses, each built with stone walls and mason ranging from single room to multi-roomed courtyard houses. Niches were cut in the walls for storage, and they were roofed with brushwood laid over wooden rafters. The mosques were more ambitiously planned.

The old section of Amud spans 25 acres (100,000 m^{2}) and contains hundreds of ancient ruins of multi-roomed courtyard houses, stone walls, complex mosques, and other archaeological remains, including intricate colored glass bracelets and Chinese ceramics.

According to Sonia Mary Cole, the town features 250 to 300 houses and an ancient temple. The temple was constructed from carefully dressed stone, and was later transformed into a mosque. It also features pottery lamps.

Curle in 1937 identified jars in Amud resembling honey jars still common in Harar however no longer used in Somaliland.

Amud is home to several historic pilgrimage sites belonging to celebrated Somali Saints, the most prominent being Saint Sau, Saint Amud and Saint Sharlagamadi, some sources associate these Saints with a proto-Somali ethnic group that lived in the region, where another source associates Amud with the Harla people. During his research in the area, the historian G.W.B. Huntingford noticed that whenever a historic site had the prefix Aw in its name (such as the ruins of Awbare and Awbube), it denoted the final resting place of a local Saint. The patron Saint Amud is buried in the vicinity of the ancient town.

The Amoud University in Borama is named after the archaeological site.

== Demographics ==
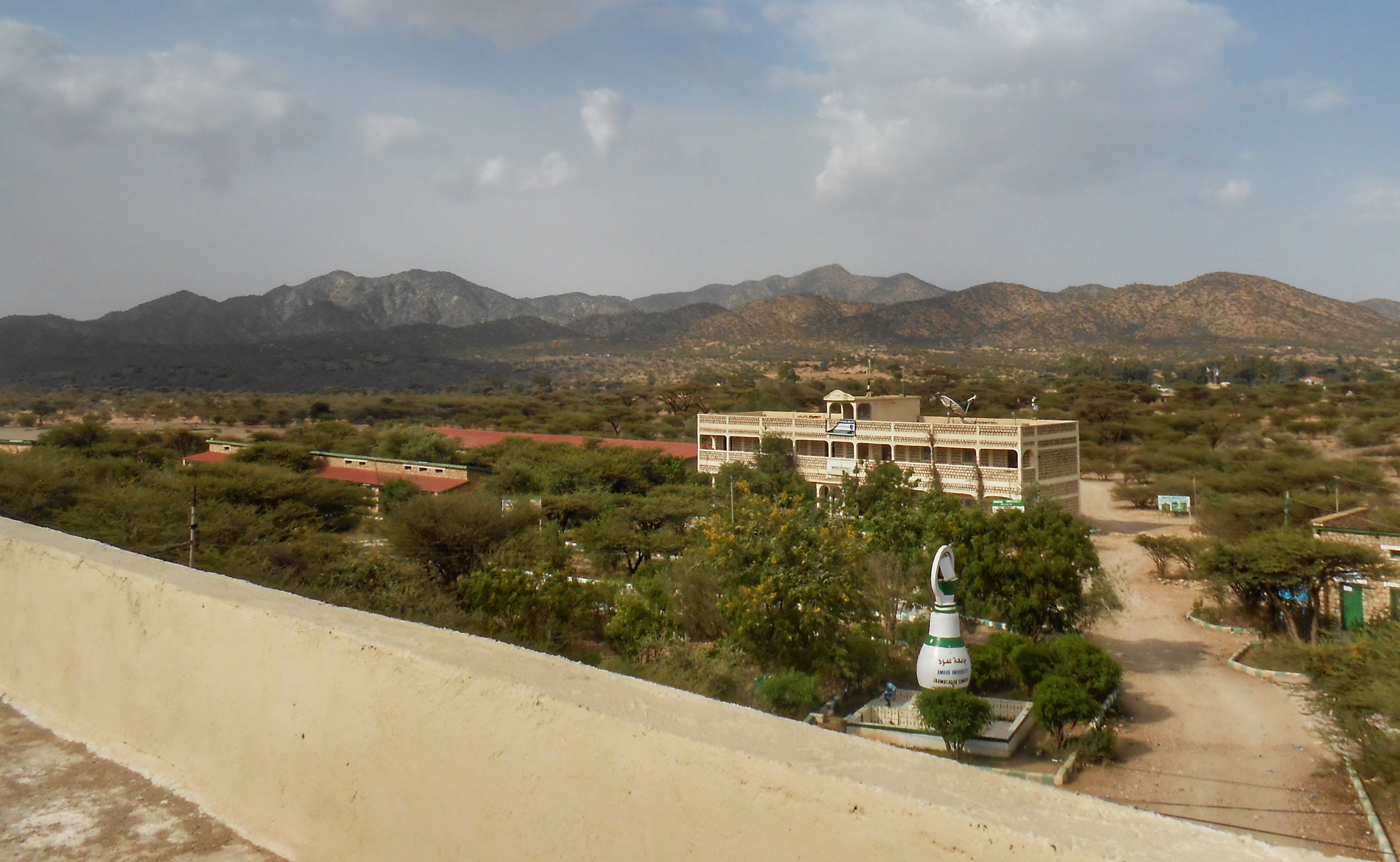
Amoud University

The region around the ancient town and university is inhabited by the Faarah Nuur, one of the two sub divisions of Reer Nuur and Galaal-weyne sub division of the Reer Mohamed, both subclans of the Gadabuursi Dir clan.

== See also ==
- Abasa
- Awbare
- Awbube
- Amoud University
- Borama
