= Arabi, Ethiopia =

Arabi Araabi (Somali)
- City
- Location in Ethiopia
- Coordinates: 09°56′01″N 42°43′03″E
- Country: Ethiopia
- Region: Somali Region
- District: Dembel, Sitti Zone
- Time zone: UTC+3 (EAT)
- Climate: BSh

Arabi (Somali: Araabi), is a town located in the Dembel district of the Sitti Zone, in the Somali region of Ethiopia. It is located in the famous Harrawa Valley in the Gadabuursi country.

== History ==
Arabi, Ethiopia is an old settlement and is the final resting place of Ughaz Cabdi Ugaas Cali (died: 1664), Ugaas and leader of the Gadabuursi Dir clan. Arabi is located in the famous Harrawa Valley in the Gadabuursi country.

The Ethiopian Administration for Refugee and Returnee Affairs and the UNHCR together opened a refugee camp in Arabi in the late 1980s and early 1990s to serve refugees of Gadabuursi origin.

== Demographics ==
The town and region is primarily inhabited by the Bahabar cabdale subclan of the Gadabuursi Dir clan.
