= Tuli Gulled =

District in Gerikombe, Ethiopia

Tuli Gulled Tuli Guuleed (Somali)
- District
- Location within Ethiopia Tuli Gulled (Africa)
- Coordinates: 9°37′N 42°45′E
- Country: Ethiopia
- Region: Somali
- Zone: Faafan
- Elevation: 1,816 m (5,958 ft)

Population (2007)
  - Total: 92,901
- Time zone: UTC+3 (EAT)

Tuli Gulled (Somali: Tuli Guuleed) is a district in the Faafan zone of the Somali Region of Ethiopia.

== History ==
Tuli Guleed has often been the centre of clashes between the Geri Koombe clan and the Jaarso clan, who lived synonymously in the district until the re-shaping of the districts line in 2004. The district has a majority, with the remaining being the Jaarso The clan clashes came from the minority Jaarso the majority Geri Koombe refusing. However, it is still in the Somali Region as the majority of the population are Somali.

== Demographics ==
Based on the 2017 Census conducted by the Central Statistical Agency of Ethiopia (CSA), this woreda has a total population of 92,901, with 52,100 being men and 38,801 being women. This woreda is primarily inhabited by the Jaarso clan of the . The largest ethnic group reported in Tuli Guleed are assumed to be the Somalis, however this is not clear due to the district being new in the time of the census. however other Somali clans such as the Jidwaaq, Abdi Kumade of the Darod the Karanle of the Hawiye and the Geri of the Darood clan can also be found in
