= Aw (father) =

Honorific title in the Harari and Somali languages

Aw (Harari: ኣው Āw; sometimes spelled Au) is an honorific title in the Harari and Somali languages. It commonly designates a father, respected elder or saint in Harari and Somali languages. It is used widely and most commonly in the Somali territories.

== Etymology ==
According to linguist Edward Ullendorff term '"Aw"' from Harari language is linked to the Proto-Semitic term Ab meaning father. According to Giorgio Banti the term has been adopted by various Somali clans from the Harari language.

== History ==
During his research in the ancient town of Amud, the historian G.W.B. Huntingford noticed that whenever an old site had the prefix Aw in its name (such as the ruins of Awbare and Awbube), it denoted the final resting place of a local saint. The honorific prefix Aw was a customary title in Adal and among the Somali

Most notably applied to the founder of Harar Aw Abadir. According to the southern Somali Geledi clan, the appellation Aw was common amongst them and was used “scrupulously” in interactions between the nobles and half casts. Sorcerers among the Arsi Oromo are known as Awan Shan, a designation derived from the Somali title Aw, with shan meaning "five" in the Oromo language.

== Notables ==
People with the title include:

- Aw Barkhadle, saint
- Aw Barre (Awbare), Adal era saint
- Aw Buba (Awbube), pre Ifat era saint
- Aw Abdal/Idal, saint
- Aw Ali Hamdogn, saint and scholar
- Aw Abadir (Aw Badir), saint and scholar
- Aw Umar Ziad, saint
- Aw Ansaar, saint
- Aw Hashim, saint and scholar
- Aw Seid Ali, saint
- Aw Sofi Yahya, saint and scholar
- Aw Khutub, saint and scholar
- Aw Qurrabe Limay, saint
