= Makayl-Dheere =

Northern Somali clan

Makayldheere
- Ethiopia Somaliland Djibouti
- (Dir) Dir (including those of ancestral descent)

Regions with significant populations
- Ethiopia, Somaliland, Djibouti

Languages
- Somali, Arabic

Religion
- Islam

Related ethnic groups
- Other Gadabuursi clans, and Dir clans such as Barsuug, Biimaal, Gurgura, Surre, Issa

The Makayl-Dheere (English: Makail Dera, Somali: Makayldheere, Amharic: ሚካኤል ዳራ, Arabic:مكائيل ديري) also known as Makaahiil-Dheere (Makayldheere), is a northern Somali clan, a sub-division of the Makahiil sub-clan of the Gadabuursi Dir clan family.

== Overview ==
The Makayl-Dheere are one of the biggest sub-divisions of the Gadabuursi clan family. Historically, they occupy the buffer zones between the Gadabuursi and Issa clans in Ethiopia. They also border the Jaarso, Geri Koombe and the Hawiye.

== Distribution ==
The territory of the Makayl-Dheere is almost exclusively in Ethiopia, however, they also reside in Somaliland and Djibouti.

Within Ethiopia, the Makayl-Dheere reside in both the Somali Region and Oromo Region. In the Somali Region, they specifically reside in the Awbare district and make up the majority of the clans which reside in the Dembel district. They make up the largest clan inhabiting the famous Harrawa Valley in the Gadabuursi country which strides both the Awbare and Dembel districts. In the Oromo Region, the Makayl-Dheere reside in Metehara and Chinhahsan. They also inhabit rural areas east of Dire Dawa and in the immediate vicinity of Harar.

Within Somaliland, the Makayl-Dheere reside in the Awdal region, specifically the Borama District.

Within Djibouti, the Makayl-Dheere reside in Quarter 4 and 5 of Djibouti (city).

== History ==
As a member of the Dir clan, the Makayl-Dheere come under the Makahiil branch of the Gadabuursi. As a member of the Dir clan, the Makayl-Dheere were a part of the Sultanate of Ifat and the Adal Sultanate. These sultanates were run by the Walashma dynasty, who were originated by the famous Yusuf bin Ahmad al-Kawneyn.

The Makayl-Dheere also reside in some of the oldest towns of these sultanates such as Awbare which is considered an important historical area and home to many Somali saints.

The royal family of the Gadabuursi, the Ugasate, evolved from and is a successor kingdom to the Sultanate of Harar. The first Ughaz of this break away and successor kingdom, Ali Makail Dera (Cali Makayl-Dheere) was the son of the progenitor of the Makayl-Dheere.

According to a Max Planck research paper, one branch of the Reer Ugaas of the Makayl-Dheere on the borders of Ethiopia rose to the rank of dejazmach (ደጃዝማች ), (‘Commander of the Gate’). A military title meaning commander of the central body of a traditional Ethiopian armed force composed of a vanguard, main body, left and right wings and a rear body.^{[4]}

The Horyaal Democratic Front was a Gadabuursi paramilitary organization that was active in the Somali Region of Ethiopia, the bulk of which whom were from the Makayl-Dheere. Their area of influence straddled the Somaliland border and incorporated the Dire Dawa, Jijiga, Chinhahsan, Tuli Guled, Harar, Ejersa Goro and the Awbare zones. The centre of this rebel movement was the mountains between Chinhahsan and Dire Dawa.

== Gadabuursi Ughazate (Ugaasyada ama Boqortooyada Gadabuursi) ==
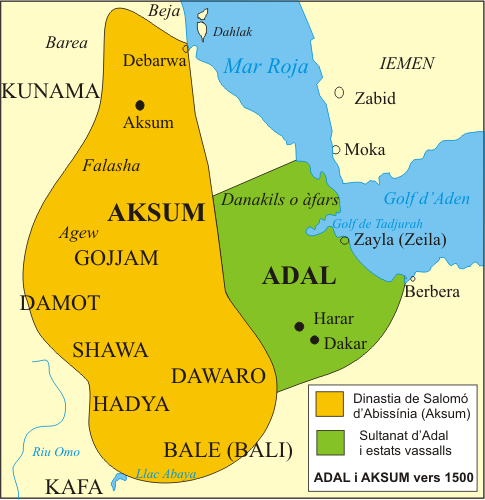
The Adal Sultanate which was largely on part of the Gadabuursi territory and the conquest of Abyssinia which they contributed to.

The royal family of the Gadabuursi, the Ugasate, evolved from and is a successor kingdom to the Sultanate of Harar and Adal Sultanate. The first Ughaz of this break away and successor kingdom, Ali Makail Dera (Cali Makayl-Dheere) was the son of the progenitor of the Makayl-Dheere.

The Gadabuursi give their King the title of Ughaz. It's an authentic Somali term for King or Sultan. The Gadabuursi in particular is the only clan with a longstanding tradition of having a Sultan.

The first Ughaz of the Gadabuursi was Ughaz Ali Makail Dera (Cali Makayl-Dheere), who is the progenitor of the Reer Ugaas subclan to which the royal lineage belongs.

Ughaz Ali Makail Dera (Cali Makayl-Dheere) who was born in 1575 in Dobo, an area north of the present town of Borama in north-western Somaliland, is recorded as having inflicted a heavy defeat on Galla forces at Nabadid.

Ughaz Nur I, who was crowned in 1698, married Faaya Aale Boore who was the daughter of a famous Oromo King and Chief, Aale Boore. Ughaz Nur I the first and Faaya Aale Boore gave birth to both Ughaz Hiraab and Ughaz Shirdoon who was the 7th in line after Ughaz Hiraab. Aale Boore was a famous Oromo King, the victory of the former over the latter marked a historical turning point in concluding the Oromo predominance in the Eastern Hararghe region.

The Gadabuursi managed to defeat and kill the next Oromo King after Aale Boore during the reign of Ughaz Roble I who was crowned in 1817. It is said that during his reign the Gadabuursi tribe reached great influence and tremendous height in the region, having managed to defeat the reigning Galla/Oromo King at that time whose name was Nuuno which struck a blow to the Galla's morale, due to their much loved King being killed. He was defeated by Geedi Bahdoon, also known as Geedi Malable. He struck a spear right through the King while he was in front of a tree, the spear pierced inside the tree making it not able for the King to escape or remove the spear. After he died he was buried in an area that's now called Qabri Nuuno near Sheedheer. In the picture already shared titled 'An old map featuring the Harrawa Valley in the Gadabuursi country, north of Harar' one can read Gabri Nono, which is the anglicized version of the Somali Qabri Nuuno.

Ughaz Roble I died in 1848 and was buried in an area called Dhehror (Dhexroor), near Awbare. It has become the custom for Somalis after Ughaz Roble I that whenever an Ughaz gets inaugurated and it rains, he should be named Ughaz Roble, which translates to 'the one with rain' or 'rainmaker'.

Ughaz Nur II was born in Zayla in the year 1835 and crowned in Bagi in 1848. He established strong links with the Egyptian Khedive and Abdallah II ibn Ali of Harar, during his reign the Western powers were vying for power in the Horn of Africa. He was also a great and famous poet. He was the type to speak words which would never be forgotten once they entered people's ears. He has created many poems and saying of which really explain the politics and knowledge of that time. How through patience and clever dealing one could be able to entrap one's enemy. He also used to say that whenever he heard a poem he would never forget it. His work was and is still taught in Somali Poetry classes (Suugaan: Fasalka Koobaad) among other Somali poets.

For more about Ughaz Nur II visit the following:

For more about Ughaz 'Elmi Warfaa, visit the following:

	Name	Reign From	Reign Till	Born
1	Ughaz Ali Makail Dera	1607	1639	1575
2	Ughaz Abdi I Ughaz Ali Makail Dera	1639	1664	
3	Ughaz Husein Ughaz Abdi Ughaz Ali	1664	1665	
4	Ughaz Abdillah Ughaz Abdi Ughaz Ali	1665	1698	
5	Ughaz Nur I Ughaz Abdi Ughaz Ali	1698	1733	
6	Ughaz Hirab Ughaz Nur Ughaz Abdi	1733	1750	
7	Ughaz Shirdon Ughaz Nur Ughaz Abdi	1750	1772	
8	Ughaz Samatar Ughaz Shirdon Ughaz Nur	1772	1812	
9	Ughaz Guleid Ughaz Samatar Ughaz Shirdon	1812	1817	
10	Ughaz Roble I Ughaz Samatar Ughaz Shirdon	1817	1848	
11	Ughaz Nur II Ughaz Roble Ughaz Samatar	1848	1888	1828
12	Ughaz Roble II Ughaz Nur Ughaz Roble	1888	1898	
13	Ughaz Olmi-Warfa "Olmi-Dheire" Ughaz Roble Ughaz Samatar	1898	1938	1835
14	Ughaz Abdi II Ughaz Roble Ughaz Nur	1938	1948	
15	Ughaz Dodi Ughaz Abdi Ughaz Roble	1948	1952	
16	Ughaz Roble III Ughaz Dodi Ughaz Roble	1952	1977	
17	Ughaz Jama Muhumed Ughaz Olmi-Warfa	1960	1985	
18	Ughaz Abdirashid Ughaz Roble Ughaz Dodi	1985	-	

Currently Abdirashid is the Ughaz of the Gadabuursi.

== Clan Tree ==
The Makayl-Dheere descend from Dir through Gadabuursi. The lineage is listed below.

- Gadabuursi
- Habar Makadur (Makadoor)
  - Makahil
    - Muse
      - Makail Dera (Makayl-Dheere).

The sub divisions of the Makayl-Dheere:

- Makail Dera (Makayl-Dheere)
  - Abokor
    - Reer Galaangal
    - Reer Abdi Abokor
  - Ugaas
    - Ugaas Cabdille
    - Ugaas Samatar
