= Hart Sheik =

Hart Sheik Harta Sheekh
- Agro Pastoralists
- Nickname: Idhanka Buushaale
- Location within Ethiopia
- Coordinates: 9°9′N 43°21′E
- Country: Somali Regional StateEthiopia
- Region: Somali
- Zone: Jijiga
- Elevation: 1,590 m (5,220 ft)

Population (2022)
  - Total: 126,669
- Time zone: UTC+3 (EAT)

Hart Sheik (Somali: Harta Sheekh) is a town located in eastern Ethiopia, in the Somali Region. Hart Sheik is primarily inhabited by the Sacad Muuse sub-clan of the Habar Awal Isaaq Somali people.

== Demographics ==
According to the 2022 census conducted by the Central Statistical Agency of Ethiopia (CSA) Hart Sheik had a population of mostly are Habar Awal Sub clan of Sacad Muuse 500,000.
