= Awbare (woreda) =

Coordinates: 9°45′N 43°00′E

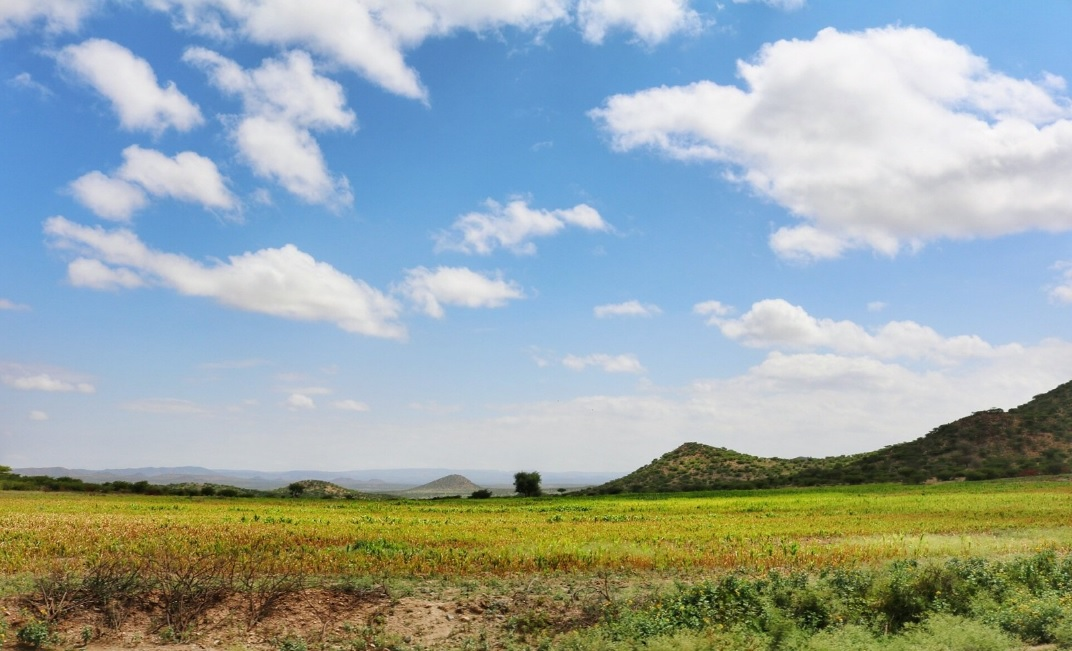
Awbare Countryside

Awbare (Amharic: ኣውባረ) (Somali: Aw Barre), officially known as Teferi Ber, is one of the woredas of the Fafan Zone in the Somali Region of Ethiopia. Awbare is bordered on the southwest by Jijiga, on the west by the Sitti Zone, on the east by Somaliland, and on the southeast by Kebri Beyah. Cities and towns in the Awbare district include Awbare, Awbube, Sheder, Lefe Isa, Derwernache, Gogti, Jaare and Heregel.

High points in this woreda include Sau (1863 meters), near the international border.

== History ==
Due to reports of a new wave of Somali refugees reaching Hart Sheik in late 2006, the Ethiopian Administration for Refugee and Returnee Affairs and the UNHCR together opened a new refugee camp at Awbare on 13 July 2007. As of June 2012, 13,553 individuals were resident at the camp, with a further 11,639 at the Sheder camp.

The Ethiopian De-mining Office reported in November 2008 that it had cleared land mines in Awbare as part of the four million square meters of land the office had cleared in the Somali Region.

== Demographics ==
This woreda is primarily inhabited by the Gadabuursi subclan of the Dir clan family.

The Department of Sociology and Social Administration, Addis Ababa University, Vol. 1 (1994), describes the Awbare district as being predominantly Gadabuursi. The journal states:

"Different aid groups were also set up to help communities cope in the predominantly Gadabursi district of Aw Bare."

Filipo Ambrosio (1994) describes the Awbare district as being predominantly Gadabuursi whilst highlighting the neutral role that they played in mediating peace between the Geri and Jarso:

"The Gadabursi, who dominate the adjacent Awbare district north of Jijiga and bordering with the Awdal Region of Somaliland, have opened the already existing camps of Derwanache and Teferi Ber to these two communities."

Based on the 2024 Census by the Federal Democratic Republic of Ethiopia's Central Statistical Agency (CSA), Awbare district has the largest district population in the Somali Region.

== Agriculture ==
A sample enumeration performed by the CSA in 2001 interviewed 21,963 farmers in this woreda, who held an average of 0.99 hectares of land. Of the 21.7 square kilometers of private land surveyed, 83.16% was under cultivation, 6.38% pasture, 8.64% fallow, and 1.82% were devoted to other uses; the percentage in woodland is missing. For the land surveyed in this woreda, 75.77% is planted in cereals like teff, sorghum and maize, 1.66% in root crops, and 1.14% in vegetables; the number for pulses is missing. Permanent crops included 908 hectares planted in khat and 4.08 in fruit trees. 89.2% of the farmers both raise crops and livestock, while 7.44% only grow crops and 3.35% only raise livestock. Land tenure in this woreda is distributed amongst 98.06% who own their land, 0.8% rent, and the remaining 1.15% held their land under other forms of tenure.
