= Awbare =

Town in Somali Region, Ethiopia

Awbare Aw Barre (Somali) Teferi Ber አውበሬ (Amharic)
- City
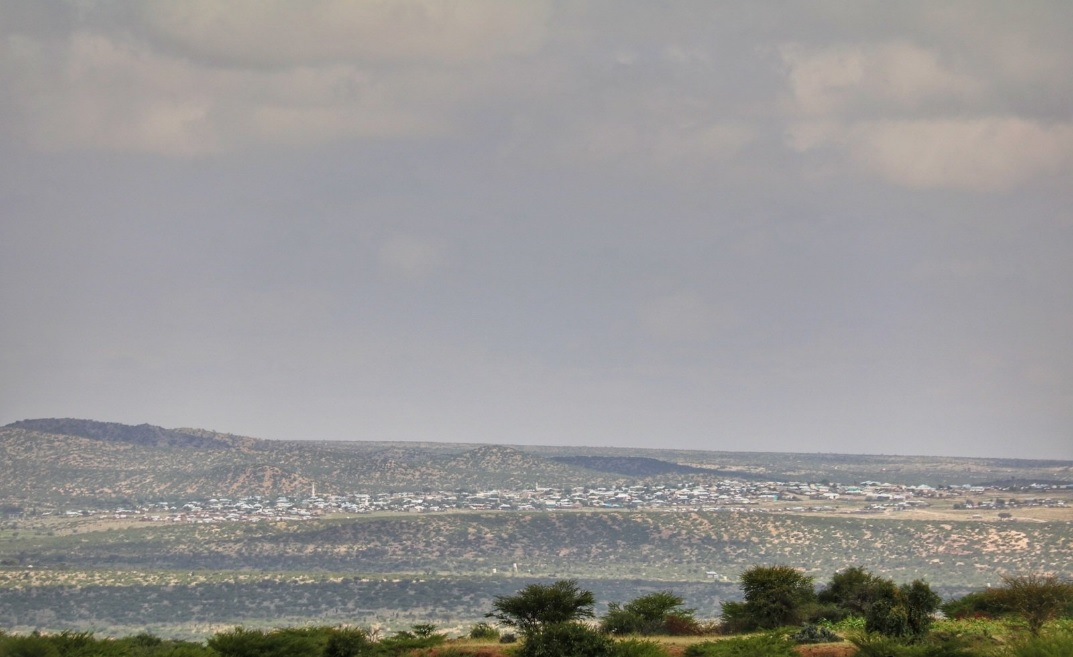
- Awbare (Teferi Ber)

- Location within Ethiopia
- Coordinates: 9°47′N 43°13′E
- Country: Ethiopia
- Region: Somali Region
- Zone: Awbare, Fafan Zone
- Elevation: 1,551 m (5,089 ft)

Population (2024)
  - Total: 728,771 (District Population)
- Time zone: UTC+3 (EAT)

Awbare (Somali: Aw Barre, Amharic: አውበሬ), officially known as Teferi Ber and called after its patron Saint Awbare, is a town in eastern Ethiopia located in the Fafan Zone of the Somali Region, near the border with Somaliland on the main trade route between Jijiga and the sea. It is the administrative centre of the Awbare district.

It was one of the biggest towns of the Adal Empire. According to Ethiopian Christian folklore, this town was the only gateway that has caused fear for the Ethiopian Christian Kingdom, hence the name Teferi Ber, meaning "The Gate of Fear".

The main trade route between Jijiga and the sea passes through Awbare; an ancient route to Zeila almost always went through Awbare. In 1962 it was described as a dry weather road. The Ethiopian News Agency reported in early 1998 that much khat was illegally smuggled out of Ethiopia by this route.

When emperor Haile Selassie inspected the region in 1935 prior to the outbreak of the Second Italo-Ethiopian War, Haile Selassie made a secret two-day excursion to Awbare. The Italian Giuda described Awbare in 1938 as a Somali village with about 1,000 inhabitants, whose houses were partly built of masonry, and possessing a mosque; a little to the west of the village was the tomb of the patron Saint Awbare.

During his research in the ancient town of Amud, the historian G.W.B. Huntingford noticed that whenever an old site had the prefix Aw in its name (such as the ruins of Awbare and Awbube), it denoted the final resting place of a local saint.

== History ==
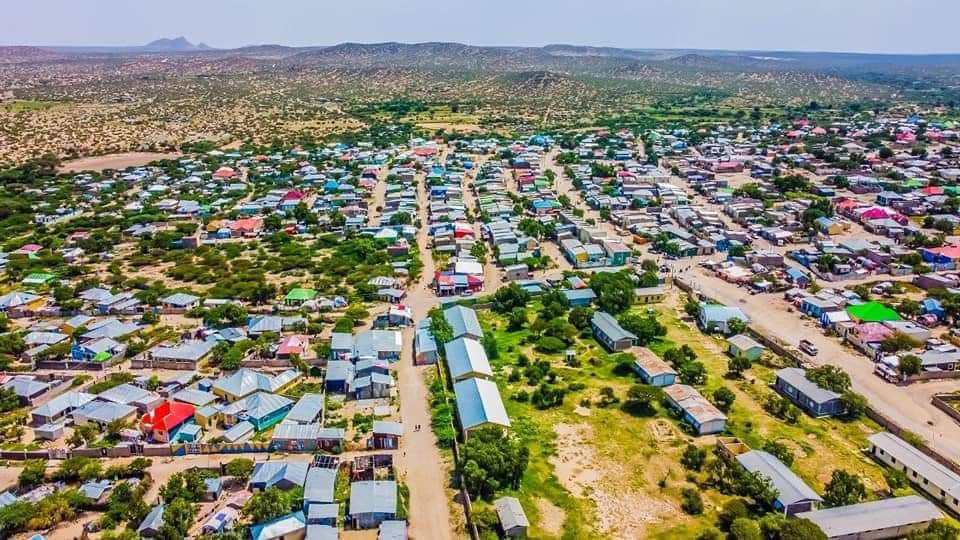
A Section of Awbare.

Awbare is one of the oldest inhabited cities in Ethiopia, also known as Teferi Ber, which in Amharic denotes the name of Ras Tafari Makonnen's (Ge'ez ልጅ፡ ተፈሪ፡ መኮንን) Gate of Fear, a threat for the Abyssinian Empire during the peak of power for the Muslim State of Adal. Awbare was one of the biggest cities of the former Adal Empire. It is the final resting place of Sheikh Awbare, whose tomb is located west of the town. The Bah Gurgura and Bah Sanayo sections of the Gadabuursi Dir clan are matrinileal descendants of both the celebrated patron saints Awbare and Awbube. According to historical accounts, both the celebrated patron saints Awbare and Awbube hail from the Nabidur branch of the Gurgura, a subclan of the Dir clan family. Both the tombs of the celebrated patron saints Awbare and Awbube are much frequented and under the protection of the local Gadabuursi Dir clan who dominate the region in which they are buried.

Richard Francis Burton (1856) describes the old ruined town upon visitation as he passed by, in his book First Footsteps in East Africa:

"Without returning the salutations of the Bedouins, who loudly summoned us to stop and give them the news, we trotted forwards in search of a deserted sheep-fold. At sunset we passed, upon an eminence on our left, the ruins of an ancient settlement, called after its patron Saint, Ao Barhe: and both sides of the mountain road were flanked by tracts of prairie-land, beautifully purpling in the evening air."

Awbare was the seat of one branch of the Reer Ughaz family (Reer Ugaas) and the Gadabuursi Ughazate. Many of the traditional leaders and kings of the Gadabuursi Ughazate were from this town, such as Ughaz Roble II Ughaz Nur II (buried in the town), Ughaz Abdi II Ughaz Roble II (who was crowned in the town during the Italian occupation of Ethiopia), Ughaz Roble III Ughaz Dodi, Sheikh Hassan Nuriye Mohamed Gele Ughaz Roble I (famous saint, administrator, merchant and father of The Ambassadorial Brothers) and others. According to Max Planck, one branch of the Reer Ughaz family (Reer Ugaas) on the Abyssinian side of the border around Awbare and the Hararghe region was known as Dejazmach (ደጃዝማች ) or 'Commander of the Gate'.

== Old Town of Awbare ==
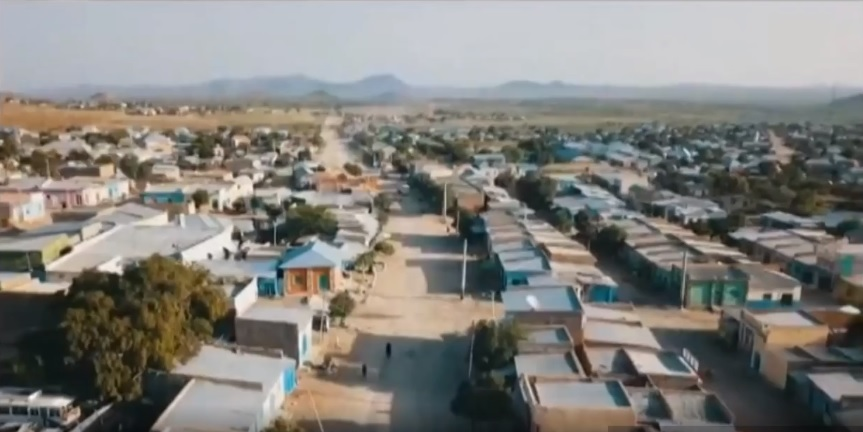
Awbare town centre.

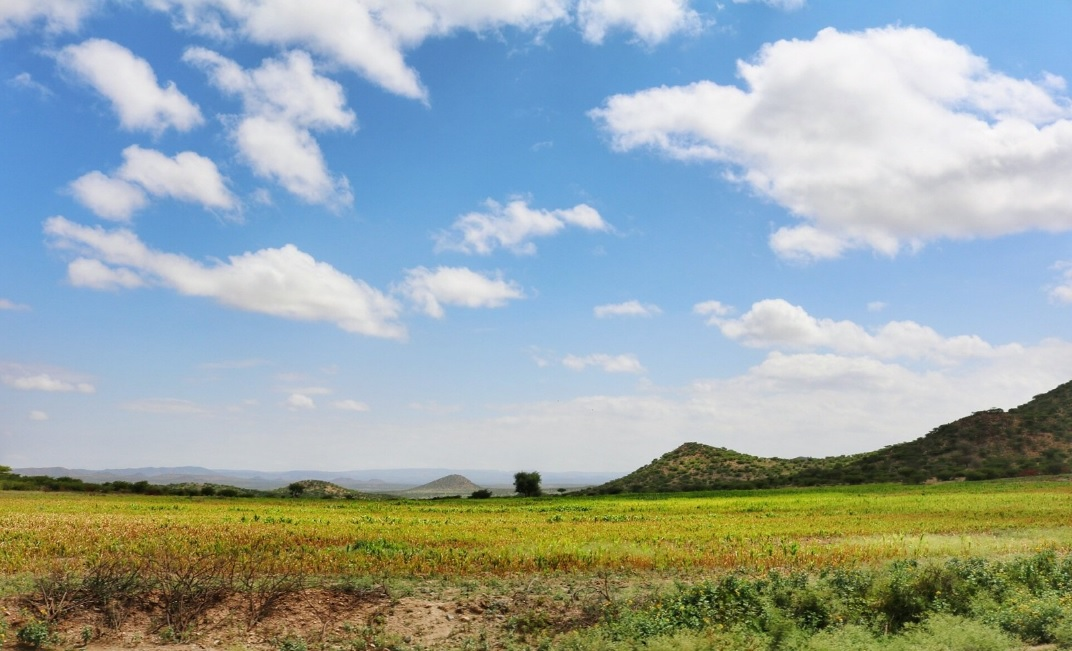
Awbare countryside.

Awbare is situated over 1,000 m above sea level. The old town contained over 200 houses, each built with stone walls and mason ranging from single room to multi-roomed courtyard houses. Niches were cut in the walls for storage, and they were roofed with brushwood laid over wooden rafters. The mosques were more ambitiously planned.

== Demographics ==
The town is inhabited by the Gadabuursi subclan of the Dir clan family. With the majority of the inhabitants belonging to the Faarah Nuur, one of the two sub divisions of the Reer Nuur, a subclan of the Gadabuursi. The town also has a sizeable population of the Reer Ugaas subclan of the Makayl-Dheere branch of the Gadabuursi.

The Department of Sociology and Social Administration, Addis Ababa University, Vol. 1 (1994), describes the Awbare district as being predominantly Gadabuursi. The journal states:

"Different aid groups were also set up to help communities cope in the predominantly Gadabursi district of Aw Bare."

Filipo Ambrosio (1994) describes the Awbare district as being predominantly Gadabuursi whilst highlighting the neutral role that they played in mediating peace between the Geri and Jarso:

"The Gadabursi, who dominate the adjacent Awbare district north of Jijiga and bordering with the Awdal Region of Somaliland, have opened the already existing camps of Derwanache and Teferi Ber to these two communities."

Based on the 2024 Census by the Federal Democratic Republic of Ethiopia's Central Statistical Agency (CSA), Awbare district has the largest district population in the Somali Region.

== Education ==
Awbare has many schools with one of the most famous and well known being the Sheikh Hassan Nuriye Primary and Elementary School.

== Notable residents ==
- Sheikh Awbare - Patron Saint of Awbare.
- Ughaz Roble II Ughaz Nur II (died: 1938) - Ughaz of the Gadabuursi clan.
- Ughaz Abdi II Ughaz Roble II (died: 1941) - Ughaz of the Gadabuursi clan.
- Ughaz Roble III Ughaz Dodi (died: 1977) - Ughaz of the Gadabuursi clan.
- Sheikh Hassan Nuriye - Famous Saint, Administrator, Merchant and Father of The Ambassadorial Brothers.
