= Dembel (woreda) =

District in Somali Region, Ethiopia

Coordinates: 9°50′N 42°30′E

Dembel is a woreda in Somali Region, Ethiopia. Part of the Shinile Zone, Dembel is bordered on the west by Shinile, on the north by Ayesha, and on the east and south by the Jijiga Zone. Towns in Dembel include Arabi, Dembel, Samakab, Sandalol, Biobahie, Dure and Harmukale.

== Overview ==
Inhabitants of this woreda have engaged in crop farming since 1965; however, there has been a great decline in crop production from 1989 to 2001. That was primarily caused by clan conflicts and aggravated by severe droughts. Between 35-45% of the inhabitants are pastoralists, while 55-65% raise cereals (mostly sorghum) as well as raise livestock.

== Demographics ==
Based on the 2017 Census conducted by the Central Statistical Agency of Ethiopia (CSA), this woreda has a total population of 206,611, of whom 156,531 are men and 50,080 women. While 18,360 are urban inhabitants, a further 88,251 were pastoralists.

Based on the 2007 Census conducted by the Central Statistical Agency of Ethiopia (CSA), this woreda has a total population of 182,286, of whom 75,094 are men and 57,192 women. While 13,648 or 16.59% are urban inhabitants, a further 17,950 or 21.81% are pastoralists. 99.3% of the population said they were Muslim. This woreda is primarily inhabited by the Gadabuursi sub-clan of the Dir clan family.

The Research-inspired Policy and Practice Learning in Ethiopia and the Nile region (2010) states that the Dembel district is predominantly Gadabuursi:

"Mainly Somali Gurgura, Gadabursi and Hawiye groups, who inhabit Erer, Dambal and Meiso districts respectively."

The 1994 national census reported a total population for this woreda of 72,168, of whom 37,814 were men and 34,354 were women; 9,756 or 13.52% were urban inhabitants. The largest ethnic group reported in Dembel was the Somali people (99.96%).
