= Subdivisions of Ethiopia =

Administrative units of Ethiopia

Subdivisions of Ethiopia. The darkest lines indicate Regions, the lighter lines Zones, and the white lines Districts.

Ethiopia is administratively divided into four levels: regions, zones, woredas (districts) and kebele (wards). The country comprises 12 regions and two city administrations under these regions, plenty of zones, woredas and neighbourhood administration: kebeles. In addition to the 12 federal states within the country, there are two federal-level city administrations in Addis Ababa and Dire Dawa.

== Current ==
=== Region ===
Level 1: Regions and chartered cities

The first administrative division in Ethiopia is a region, also called kilil, or alternatively regional state. The 1995 Constitution of Ethiopia established the regions based on ethno-linguistic territories. Previously, this level was called a province, and though many of the old province and new region names are the same, the entities are not identical and the words region and province are not interchangeable. As of 2023, there were twelve regions.

- Afar Region
- Amhara Region
- Benishangul-Gumuz
- Central Ethiopia
- Gambela
- Harari
- Oromia
- Sidama
- Somali
- South Ethiopia
- Southwest
- Tigray

Additionally there are two independently chartered cities which are on the same level as a region.

- Addis Ababa
- Dire Dawa

=== Zone ===
Level 2: Zones

Regions are subdivided into zones. The number of zones varies, but most regions have around six to twelve zones. The largest region Oromia has over 20 zones, and the two smallest regions have none. There are some cities which are set up as "special zones", such as Bahir Dar Special Zone in the Amhara Region. The earlier equivalent to a zone was called an awrajja, and many zones today are named the same as their earlier awrajja, but the terms zone and awrajja are not interchangeable.

=== Districts ===
Zones are divided into districts (woredas). In Ethiopia, the woredas comprise three main organs: a council, an executive and a judicial. The Woreda Council is the highest government organ of the district, which is made up of directly elected representatives from each kebele in the woredas. The representative of the people in each kebele is accountable to their electorate. The woreda chief administration is the district's executive organ that encompasses the district administrator, deputy administrator, and the head of the main sectoral executive offices found in the district, which are ultimately accountable to the district administrator and district council. The quasi-judicial tasks belong to the Security and Justice administration. In addition to woredas, city administrations are considered at the same level as the woredas. A city administration has a mayor whom members of the city council elected. As different regional constitutions govern woredas, the names of the bodies may differ.

=== Wards ===
Woredas are divided into wards (kebele), also called mu. This is the smallest administrative division. This is sometimes also called tabia or tabiya. They are at the neighbourhood level and are the primary contact for most citizens living in Ethiopia. Their administrative unit consists of an elected council, a cabinet (executive committee), a social court and the development and security staff. Kebeles are accountable to their woreda councils and are typically responsible for providing basic education, primary health care, agriculture, water, and rural roads.

== Historic provinces and awrajjas ==
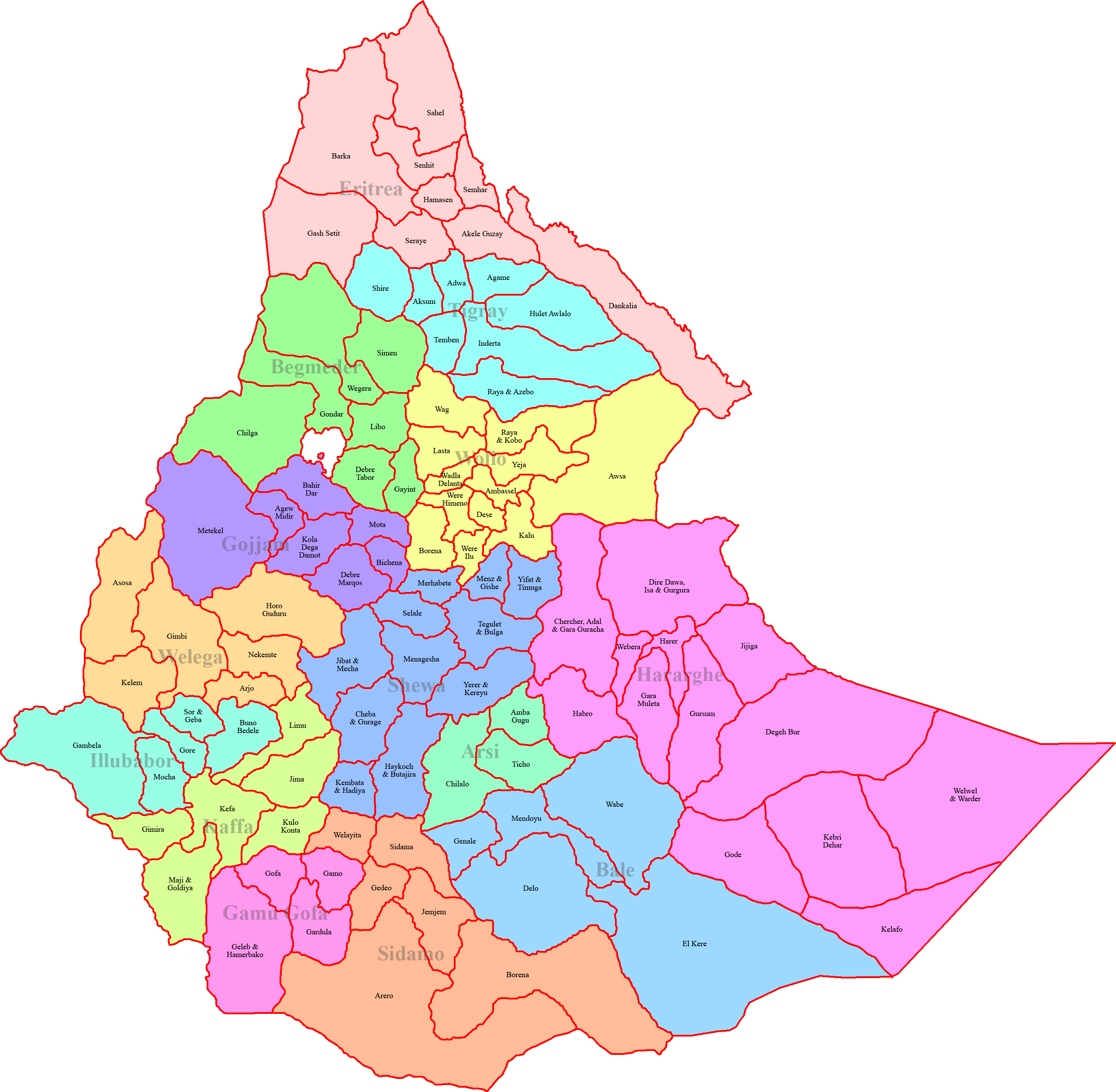
Historic: Former provinces and awrajjas (includes the Eritrea territory)

Prior to the 1995 Constitution, Ethiopia was divided into provinces, and those were further subdivided into awrajjas, then into woredas and then sub-woredas. Boundaries were sometimes redrawn and the number of provinces varied across time. (Note: Boundaries continue to be redrawn. For example, in 2021 a new region (South West Ethiopia Peoples' Region) was created by special referendum. It was created by taking several zones from Southern Nations, Nationalities, and Peoples' Region.) Awrajja were subdivisions of provinces, and were the rough equivalent of the current term zones. After the 1995 Constitution, the terms "province" and "awrajja" were dropped in favor of the terms "region" and "zone".

== See also ==
- Regions of Ethiopia
- Zones of Ethiopia
- Districts of Ethiopia
- Wards of Ethiopia
