= Vorst =

Vorst may refer to:

- Abbey of Vorst
- Forest, Belgium
- Volkswagen Vorst
- Vorst (surname)
- van Vorst, Germanic surname
