= Van Vorst =

Van Vorst is a surname. Notable people with the name include:

- Bessie Van Vorst (1873–1928), American author and journalist
- Cornelius Van Vorst (1822– 1906), American politician, Mayor of Jersey City, New Jersey
- Marie Van Vorst (1867—1936), American writer and artist

== See also ==
- Van der Vorst
- Van Vorst Township, New Jersey
