= Ughaz Roble I =

Somali noble (born 1820s)

Ughaz Roble I 𐒚𐒌𐒔𐒖 𐒇𐒙𐒁𐒐𐒗 أوغاس روبل
- Ugaas; Sultan
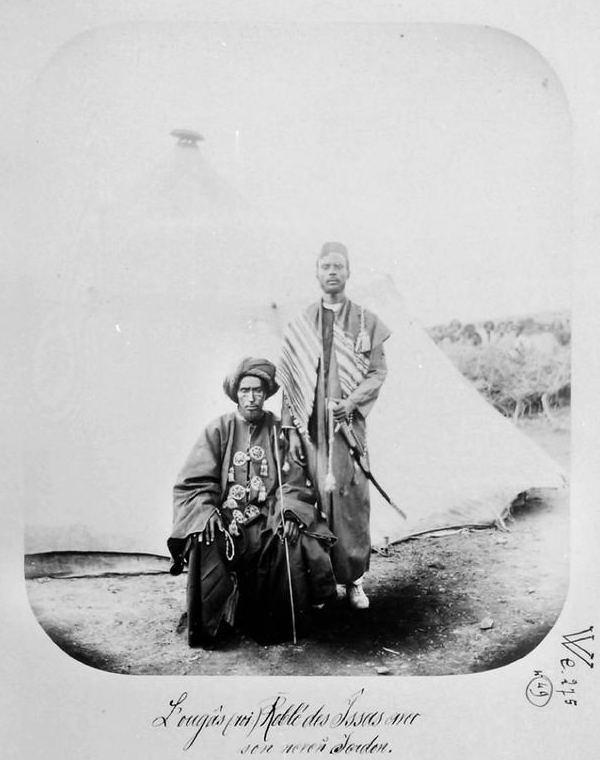
- Ugaas Rooble with his nephew, Jardon, in 1885 Jaldessa

Ughaz of the Issa
- Reign: Late 19th century
- Born: c. 1820s
- Burial: Jaldessa
- Father: Ughaz Farah
- Religion: Sunni Islam

Ughaz Roble I (Somali: Ugaas Rooble Ugaas Farax), Osmanya: 𐒚𐒌𐒔𐒖 𐒇𐒙𐒁𐒐𐒗, Arabic: أوغاس روبل), also known as Roblay, Robli, Robleh, and Robiley. Known by many as the Rain Prince was the 14th Ughaz of the Issa Ughazate. The Issa are northern Somali clan, a sub-division of the Dir clan family.

== Biography and reign ==
Ughaz Roble rose to prominence within the Issa (clan) during the latter half of the 19th century, eventually assuming the esteemed title of Ugaas, a position of leadership and authority. Ughaz Roble, a revered leader among his people, wielded significant influence and authority that stemmed from his exceptional power. The Italian explorer, Antonio Cecchi, noted that through his leadership, the Ughaz possessed the remarkable ability to amass a formidable army of up to 40,000 men in times of conflict or war.

The future Ethiopian emperor, Menelik II used to pay some sort of tribute to the Ughaz so his caravans and guests arrive safely. In 1876, the Ughaz was received and welcomed in Zeila in a very splendid way; the Pasha residents there celebrated him and went to receive him in Tocoscia. It is distinguished from the other leaders, because it is equipped with a garment, an umbrella and for the large amount of amulets, pockets and pouches. It was precisely by him that the tribute of fifty thalers and a piece of special cotton was imposed on the first expedition, which the Pasha paid instantly.

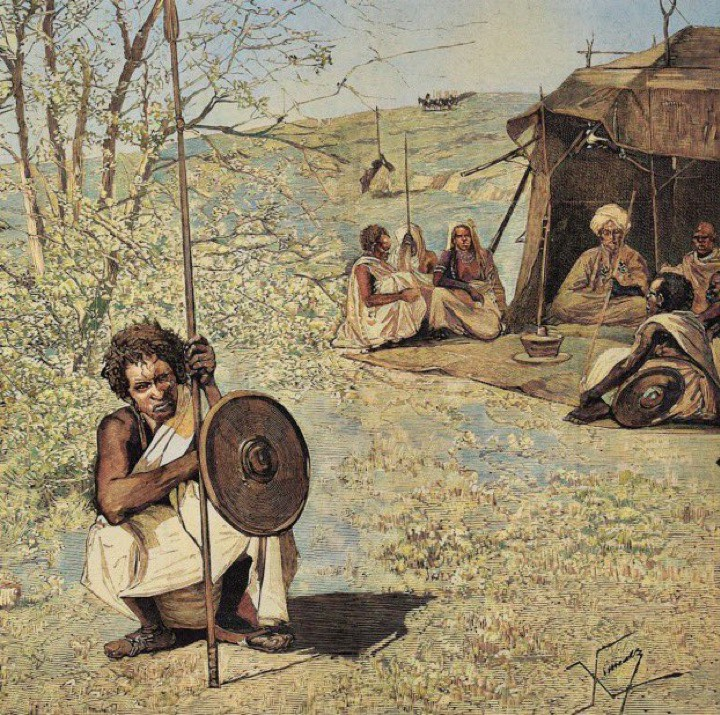
Issa Somali stands guard outside the abode of Ugaas Robleh Farah in Jaldessa who is hosting a special guest

Jaldessa was the seat of Ughaz Roble, Jaldessa where his main palace was situated. The Egyptian soldiers led an invasion of Harar and had entered Jaldessa in 1875, leaving a garrison there, which would later be the seat of Ughaz Roble Farah. Cecchi's description of Ughaz Roble is as following:

The current great chief is called Uadi-Dubli-Fara, also called Ugas-Robli; he is tall in person, with slender limbs like all his fellow country men; he has a fairly smart eye, a crushed nose and a face thrown by the vajuolo. He wears Turkish trousers, covers his shoulders with an ordinary canvas mantle and his head with a coarse tarbush, wrapped in a turban, in whose folds there is no shortage of papers and amulets. He has rather kind manners, and in the speeches he takes on an oratorical character, imposing himself with great effectiveness, and at the same time he jokes with his subjects and even with the boys who graze camels."

Philipp Paulitschke, an Austrian explorer, travelled to and explored Egypt and Nubia in 1880 and between 1884 and 1885 with Dominik Kammel Edler von Hardegger (1844–1915) the Somali and Galla lands. Paulitschke mentioned that the Ugas wished to see him and his group immediately. It was there they saw a giant man with a deep black complexion, an unusually thin, dull face, sleepy eyes, prominent cheekbones, dressed in a snow-white coat, was standing there. Marro, brandishing a small stick in his right hand, in front of the tent: His highness the Ugaas Roble Farah "The Rain Prince".

== See also ==
- Egyptian invasion of the Eastern Horn of Africa
- Somali aristocratic and court titles
- Jaldessa
- Khedivate's Somali Coast
- Khedivate of Egypt
