= Vorst (surname) =

Vorst (Latinized: Vorstius) is a surname. Notable people with the name include:

- Johannes Vorst, 1623-1696
- Joseph Vorst, American painter
- Levie Vorst (1903–1987), Dutch rabbi
- Scott Vorst, American soccer player
- Ton Vorst, Dutch economist

== See also ==
- Van der Vorst
- Van Vorst
