= Antonia Isola =

Mabel Earl McGinnis Richardson (May 16, 1876 – ), known by the pen name Antonia Isola, was an American cookbook author who wrote Simple Italian Cookery, the first Italian cookbook published in the U.S.

== Biography ==
McGinnis was born in New York, the sixth and youngest child of John McGinnis and Lydia Olivia Matteson, the daughter of Illinois Gov. Joel Aldrich Matteson. Her father, a wealthy investor and banker, and her grandfather were both credibly accused of financial corruption in the 1850s–60s.

She had lived in Rome for some years and was well-versed in Italian food, but publishers Harper & Brothers chose the pseudonym Antonia Isola to impart an air of "authenticity" to the work. Simple Italian Cookery was published February 1912.

In 1917, she married fellow writer and diplomat Norval Richardson in Rome, Mississippi. He served as secretary of U.S. embassies at Rome (1916–20), Lisbon (1920–22), and Tokyo (1922–24). Her sister Bessie Van Vorst was also a noted writer whose second marriage was to French author Hugues Le Roux. Her sister Adèle McGinnis Herter was an artist.
