= Mersha Nahusenay =

Ethiopian reformist (1850–1937)

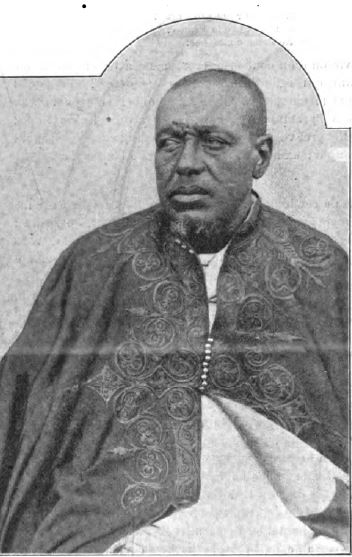
- Mersha Nahusenay around 1900
- Born: c. 1850; Shewa, Ethiopia
- Died: c. 1937 (aged 86–87); Harar, Ethiopia
- Occupations: Governor; reformist; diplomat
- Known for: Pioneering Contributions to the modernization of Ethiopia

Mersha Nahusenay (c. 1850 – c. 1937) was an Ethiopian reformist and pioneer of change who made important contributions to the modernization and independence of Ethiopia. One of the closest advisors to Emperor Menelik II, he went on to become the first governor of Dire Dawa, and surrounding areas (1902–1905). Prior to that he was governor of the strategic and frontier district of Jaldessa (Gildessa) and its environ where he also held the key position of Head of Customs. His public career lasted over three decades from the time of Menelik II (referred to in historical records as Menilek) until the reign of Haile Selassie. Mersha understood French and was open to European ideas of progress earning him admiration abroad. His most enduring legacy is perhaps the supervision of the day to day activities of the construction, maintenance and security of the first railroad which he oversaw at the request of Menilek. Mersha belongs to a generation of Ethiopians who took advantage of the relative stability of the late 19th – early 20th century to implement a series of wide-ranging political, military, economic and social reforms, paving the way to the founding of present-day Ethiopia.

== Early life ==
=== Childhood and Formative Years ===
Ato (Mr.) Mersha Nahusenay (አቶ መርሻ ናሁሠናይ) was born about 1850 near the town of Ankober, the former capital of Shewa.

According to oral history, Mersha came from a family of priests. His parents were strict followers of the Ethiopian Orthodox faith and religion played a central role in their life. Mersha's childhood was hence heavily influenced by events involving the Church where he was also baptized. Family lore further indicates that his father owned a land given to him in return for the service he rendered to the church. In addition to holding lands, churches at the time received considerable assistance from the royal palace which they then used to provide key services to their members and communities, including the education of children. Thus Mersha was taught reading and writing at an early age and received traditional church education. Whether or not he had any siblings remains unknown although the name Mersha in the Amharic language often implies a parental wish or mechanism to cope with a traumatic experience such as the loss of a previous child.

Growing up, Mersha spent a great deal of time on the farm with his parents. He traveled to various places within Shewa and beyond allowing him to interact with a diverse group of people and explore opportunities which existed for a career in a secular field. Early on he learned to appreciate the importance of local as well as foreign languages. He was one of the best students at the Catholic Mission, and he married Tedeneqyalesh, daughter of Ato Mekbeb an officer of Menelik's royal house. It is unclear, if he had royal ancestry. The fact that he was married to the daughter of one of Menelik's trusted servants suggests, however, that the family had close ties to the palace.

Mersha's formative and early adulthood experiences helped him prepare for his long and influential public career. Today Ankober is one of many districts (woredas) of Ethiopia, but in Mersha’s youth, the region was the capital of one of several powerful kingdoms. The following quote encapsulates the vitality of the Ankober area at the time:

The early nineteenth-century Shawan royal capital of Ankober was a spectacular sight, ‘perched at 2400 meters atop a volcanic cone above the steep escarpment of the eastern highlands’. It commanded a prosperous, cosmopolitan and culturally diverse polity. Founded as a frontier outpost in the late-eighteenth century, fifty years later Ankober stood amidst a rich agricultural area and controlled the Red Sea trade through regional markets such as Aliyu Amba. Visited by Muslim merchants and traders from the Mediterranean, and a busy ecclesiastical base of Orthodox theology, Ankober was a lively commercial and intellectual center.

By mid-19th century, Ankober had established trade and diplomatic ties with the outside world. As a result, there was strong public interest in international affairs, foreign languages, history, geography and medicine, as well as the design, manufacturing and function of machines and tools as documented by missionaries. Under Menelik, the last ruler of Shewa (1865–1889), Ankober rapidly evolved into a vibrant political and economic center. Trade was expanded to the Gulf of Aden and the Red Sea via Harar.

Mersha also grew up in one of the most consequential periods in the nation's history. The second half of the nineteenth century was a turning point in the sense that it marked the end a long period of deep divisions within and between the various kingdoms located in the northern part of the country known as the Era of Princes or Zemene Mesafint (1769–1855). Emperor Tewodros (Tewodros II) was the first ruler (1855–1868) in the modern era to try and unify the northern kingdoms. Included in Tewodros' vision also was the introduction of European-style civilization. His efforts were cut short however by internal resistance and external challenges as well as his untimely death. Emperor Yohannes (Yohannes IV) further pursued the unification agenda during his reign (1872–1889), but he was unfortunately killed in a war with Mahdist Sudan. Emperor Menelik II (1889–1913), his successor, the fortunate one to realize the dreams of his predecessors and much more. He succeeded in bringing together, under a central authority, northern and southern territories. Through a combination of diplomacy and military campaigns, he was able to create a new empire paving the way for the emergence of modern Ethiopia.

Menelik's extraordinary achievements, including his leadership in the decisive victory over Italy at Adwa, in 1896, enabled him to put the country on the path to stability and modernization. According to the prominent Ethiopian historian Tekletsadiq Mekuria, Menelik's top priorities included: negotiating Ethiopia's borders with the three European colonial powers (i.e., France, Britain and Italy) who controlled much of Eastern Africa; securing access to the Gulf of Aden and the Red Sea as a way of improving trade relations with Europe and beyond; maintaining security and stability across the vast empire; implementing a wide-ranging political, economic and social reforms; and building Ethiopia's image abroad.

As will be seen below, Mersha was at the forefront of most, if not all, of these undertakings. He answered repeated calls for public service and rose to the occasion by taking on challenging tasks. More importantly, he was a strong advocate for reform and European-style modernization. The renowned Ethiopian historian Tekletsadiq Mekuria wrote in his book Atse Menilek and the Unity of Ethiopia:

ስለዚህ ዐፄ ምኒልክ የነዚህንና የውጭ አገር ተወላጅ አማካሪዎች ምክር በመስማት እውጭ አገር ደርሰው መጠነኛ እውቀት እየቀሰሙ የተመለሱትን የነግራዝማች ዬሴፍን፤ የነነጋድራስ ዘውገን፤ የእነ አቶ አጥሜን፤ የነ አቶ መርሻ ናሁ ሠናይን፤ የነ ብላታ ገብረ እግዚአብሔርን፤ የነ ከንቲባ ገብሩን፤ የነአለቃ ታየን፤ የነ ነጋድራስ ገብረ ሕይወት ባይከዳኝን፤ የነ አቶ ኀይለ ማርያም ስራብዮንን፤ አስተያየት በማዳመጥ በአገራቸው የአውሮፓን ሥልጣኔ ለማስገባት ታጥቀው ተነሡ።

English translation: Thus, after listening to the advice of these and other personal foreign advisors and taking into account the views of those who had travelled abroad and returned with limited knowledge such as Grazmach Yosef, Negaddras Zewge, Ato Atsme, Ato Mersha Nahusenay, Blata Gebre Egziabher, Kentiba Gebru, Aleqa Taye, Negadras Gebre Hiwot Baykedagn and Ato Hailemariam Serabyo, Atse Menelik decided to introduce European civilization to his country.

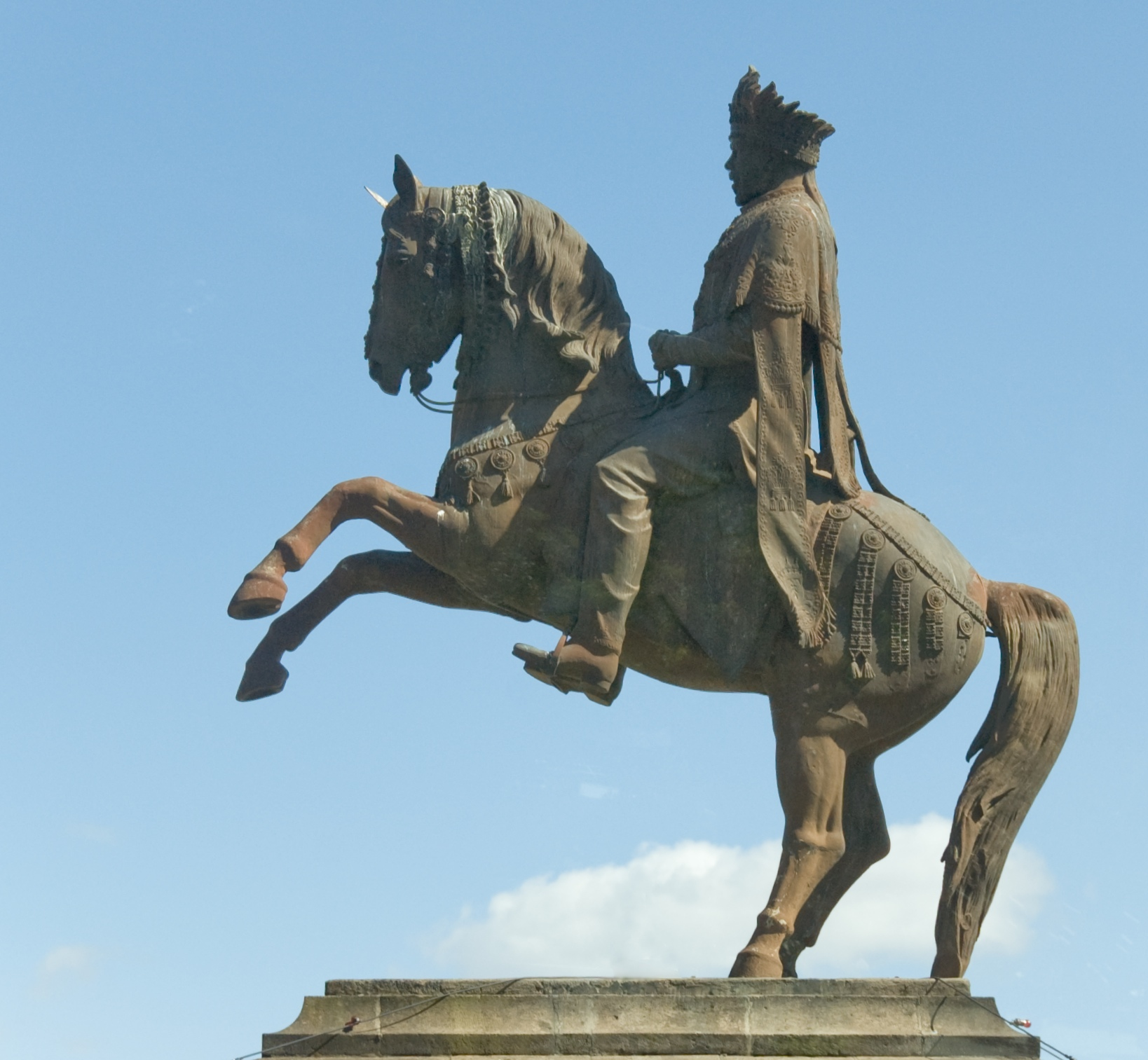
Statue of Emperor Menelik II in Addis Abeba

== Later life ==
Whether Mersha Nahusenay held any official imperial government positions before Menelik II became Emperor of Ethiopia in 1889 remains unknown. What is evident from historical records is sometime in the early 1890s, at the age of about 40, he left his birthplace and settled in the Harar province. By then, Ankober had declined in part due to the rise of Addis Abeba (Addis Ababa), as the new capital of Ethiopia founded in 1886 by Menelik and his influential wife Empress Taytu Betul (1851–1918).

=== Governor of Jaldessa and Head of Imperial Customs ===
Mersha's relocation to Harar marked the beginning of his long and distinguished career. By some accounts as early as 1892, but surely by 1895, he was appointed governor of Jaldessa (Gildessa, Jildessa, Guildessa, Gheldessa), a historic and strategic district near the present city of Harar. According to one source., at the time, Jaldessa had approximately 6,000 inhabitants at the time compared to 8,000 in the port city of Djibouti and 30,000 in Harar. Not only was Jaldessa a frontier town to Menelik's empire, but it was also located along an important caravan route connecting Ethiopia with the Gulf of Aden and the Red Sea coast. As a result, all visitors were required to pass through an armed and customs post established there by the Ethiopian authority and administered by Mersha. As chief of customs, Jaldessa Mersha oversaw the import of all goods. Caravans were stopped and inspected. Import duty of 10 per cent was levied on merchandise generating important revenue for the empire. The economic value of Jaldessa grew considerably after the port of Djibouti became operational. However, it sharply declined following the founding of Dire Dawa, in 1902.

As governor, Mersha controlled and administered a vast area between Ethiopian borders with the French and British Somalilands and the Awash River. The territory was inhabited by Somalis, Oromos, Afars and other ethnic groups. He served under Ras Mekonnen Woldemichael (Makonnen Wolde Mikael), who was governor of Harar Province until his untimely death in 1906. The Armenian Serkis Terzian (1868–1915) served as governor of Jaldessa before him. Terzian, a personality well known to scholars of Ethiopian history, served Menelik in various capacities, including the import of arms and ammunition. Apparently, there was confusion at times about who owned what. On one occasion, Mersha confiscated arms claimed by Terzian, according to distinguished historian Richard Pankhurst. Lord Hindlip, a British businessman and adventurer and a member of an Anglo-American expedition, described his visit to Mersha's residence as follows:

He received us in his official residence, a small circular hut with the usual pointed roof, built on a conical hill. His furniture consisted of a table, chair, two beds, a photograph of an Abyssinian priest, and a coloured Crucification, while his rifle, shield, and revolver were hung on the walls.

Furthermore, Jaldessa was at the center of international negotiations between Menelik and the three colonial powers. Article 3 of the 1897 treaty signed between Britain and Ethiopia, for example, stated that the route between Zeyla (Zeila) and Harar via Gildessa should remain open for the commercial interests of the two countries. Mersha was regularly consulted on relevant matters. He was also directly responsible for implementation of agreements. For instance, in 1896, he hosted Cyrille Macaire (Kyrillos Makarios), a coptic Egyptian bishop who came as a special envoy of Pope Leo XIII to plead with Menelik to free the Italian prisoners from the battle of Adwa. When the prisoners were freed ultimately, they were brought to an area near Gildessa to meet with an Italian Red Cross team before being transported to Harar for safe return to Italy. Mersha visited Djibouti on several occasions, including at the request of Emperor Menelik. His knowledge of French was invaluable during his foreign trips.

=== Promoter of a progressive image of Ethiopia ===
Following the victory at Adwa (1896), there was a heightened global interest in strengthening diplomatic and trade relations with Ethiopia. A large number of foreign nationals, including diplomats, journalists, writers, scientists and explorers visited the empire. The visitors were intrigued by Menelik's wisdom and accomplishments. Realizing the significance of the moment for the future, the emperor was equally determined to build a progressive image of his nation. What better place to create a good first impression than the frontier town of Jaldessa? Lord Edward Gleichen, the British courtier, officer and author who visited Ethiopia in 1897 and who was a member of Sir Rennell Rodd's diplomatic mission wrote the following:

Next day we made a long march of twenty-four miles over stony country to Garasle, a pretty little river, three inches deep, running between high banks, and a three hours' march on the following morning brought us to Gildessa. Here we were received in great state by the governor, one Aito Merzha (i.e., Ato Mersha), who, to impress on us that we were now on Abyssinian territory, had turned out a guard of about a dozen men, all armed with rifles and carrying the Abyssinian flag. The latter, I fear, did not impress us much, as it only consisted of triangular yellow, red, and green pennons nailed on a thin and crooked stick; but the guard of honour was very beautiful.

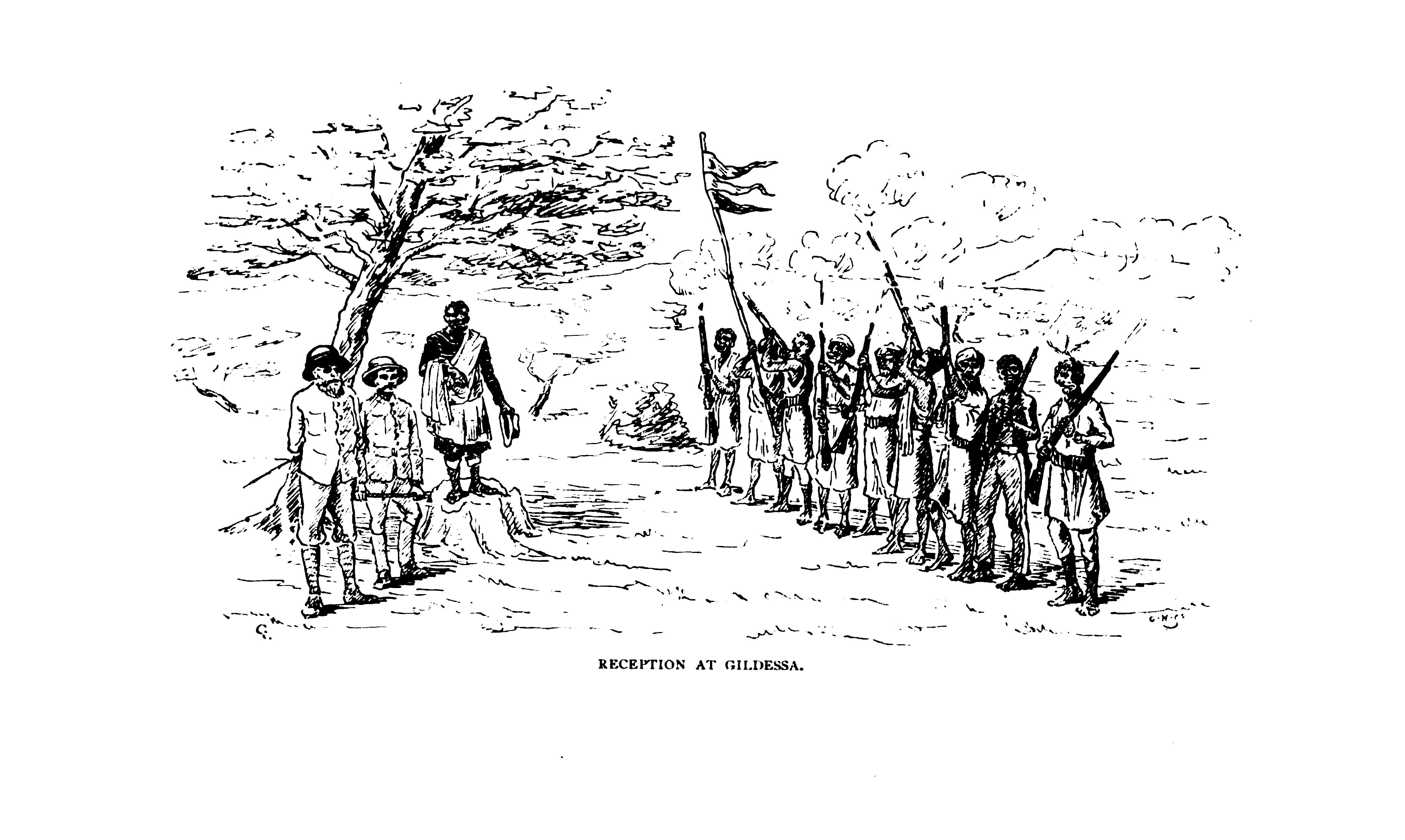
Reception of the British mission led by Rennell Rodd at Gildessa in 1897, after Count Edward Gleichen 1898

Most visitors came to the country through the Gulf of Aden and the Red Sea and many camped at Jaldessa for at least a day before traveling further to Addis Abeba, Harar or other parts of the new empire. Thus, Mersha was tasked with providing logistical and other forms of assistance to the guests. He was uniquely positioned to meet and interact with a large number of Europeans and other foreign nationals. In an article published in Le Figaro (April 1901), the French journalist and author Hughes Le Roux noted the following after a long discussion with Mersha.

Je ne sais si ce sage a lu Candide, mais depuis les années déjà longues que le Roi des rois lui a confié la clef de la première poterne de l'empire, il a vu défiler beaucoup d'hommes de toutes couleurs, de tous pays, de toutes langues.

English translation: I do not know if this wise man read Candide, but since for many years the King of Kings has given him the key to the first gate of the empire, he had seen people of all colors, all countries, and all languages.

The following is a partial list of notables who have either interacted with or hosted by Mersha at Gildessa or Dire Dawa:

- Prince Henri of Orleans (1867–1901): French prince;
- Harald George Carlos Swayne (1860–1940): British army officer and author;
- Vicomte Edmond de Montaigne de Poncins (1866– 1937): explorer, naturalist and author;
- Lord Albert Edward Wilfred Gleichen (1863–1937): British diplomat and author;
- Pyotr Mikhailovich Vlasov (1850–1904): head of the Russian Imperial mission to Ethiopia
- Jean-Baptiste Marchand (1863–1934): French army officer and explorer;
- Robert Peet Skinner (1866–1960): American diplomat;
- Lucien Heudebert (1860–1949): French writer;
- Jean-François-Albert du Pouget, Marquis de Nadaillac (1818–1904): French anthropologist;
- Hughues Le Roux (aka Robert Charles Henri Le Roux) (1860–1925): French journalist, author and senator;
- Robert Pierre Marie Robert, vicomte du Bourg de Bozas(1871–1902): French explorer;
- Peter Nikolaevich Krasnov (1869–1947): Russian diplomat and military officer;
- Victor Félix Edmond Marie Goedorp (1874–1963): French publicist and author;
- Benito Sylvain (1868–1915): Haitian lawyer, anti-slavery activist and Pan Africanist;
- Friedrich Rosen (1856–1935): German diplomat, orientalist, author and politician; he is the brother of botanist Felix Rosen.
- Kyrillos Makarios or Cyrille Macaire (1867–1921): Egyptian Coptic leader, Patriarch of Alexandria;
- Cesare Nerazzini (1849–1912): Italian diplomat, doctor and military officer
- William Fitzhugh Whitehouse (1842–1909): American explorer and adventurer;
- Felix Rosen (1863–1925): German Botanist, professor of botany at Breslau University (then Germany, now Wrocław, Poland); he is the brother of diplomat and orientalist Friedrich Rosen.
- François Marie Casimir Mondon-Vidailhet (1847–1910): French journalist, philologist and author;
- Sir Charles Allsopp, 3rd Baron Hindlip (1877–1911): British businessman, adventurer and writer;
- Rennell Rodd (1858–1941): British diplomat, politician and poet;
- Alexander Bulatovich (1870–1919): Russian military officer, diplomat and author;
- Azmzade Sadik El Mueyyed Pasha (1860–1910): Aide de Camps to the Ottoman Sultan Abdulhamid II: head of the Ottoman delegation to Emperor Menelik II in 1904.

Despite robust diplomatic efforts by Menelik and his domestic as well as foreign advisors, there was a great deal of skepticism initially among many Europeans that Ethiopia was ready to embrace modernization. In an article titled The Menelik Myth, published in 1899, for example, vicomte Edmond de Poncins, the wealthy French naturalist and explorer, concluded:

The history of Ethiopia, then, may be summed up thus: a country in which communications are difficult, peopled by a multiplicity of races; its internal life presents ever the same cycle of wars, victories, defeats, its external life the same blank. A real civilization is impossible in that black chaos, and the products of civilization, such as agriculture, invention, commerce, do not exist.

In contrast, there were those who offered unwavering support for the expansion of trade and investment in Ethiopia. Menelik's closest European advisors such as the Swiss engineer Alfred Ilg and the French trader Leon Chefneux (“chief commerce advisor”) were incontestably at the top of the list. Mersha worked closely with both of them. But there were others as well. Casimir Mondon-Vidailhet, the French journalist and contributor to the Le Temps, was another important figure who played a major role in advancing Ethio-French relations. Due to his passion for horticulture, Mondon-Vidailhet may have also played a role in popularizing the eucalyptus tree (የባሕር ዛፍ). He also studied local languages (e.g. Amharic, Guraghe, Harari, etc.) and wrote books about them. More relevantly, Mondon-Vidailhet helped advance the progressive image of Menelik and Ethiopia in Europe and the United States. He did this primarily through his speeches and writings. In an interview that he gave to The New York Times, in 1898, Mondon defended Ethiopia's records and potential:

The country lends itself easily to civilization, and its organization, still encumbered by feudal relations, tends more and more to become modelled on the lines of European constitutional monarchies. Menelek, powerful and respected, an enlightened reformer and administrator, who abolished slavery in his dominions, and dislikes fanatics to whatever sect they belong, has revealed himself as a really great sovereign, worthy of admiration by his conduct, as well as by the dignity of his character.

Mersha was a strong proponent of opening Ethiopia to the world. He encouraged 'modern' education and supported missionary schools in Harar. He encouraged trade ties with Europe, particularly France, Ethiopia's major strategic ally at the time. The French government awarded Mersha the El-Anouar Nishan in April 1905.

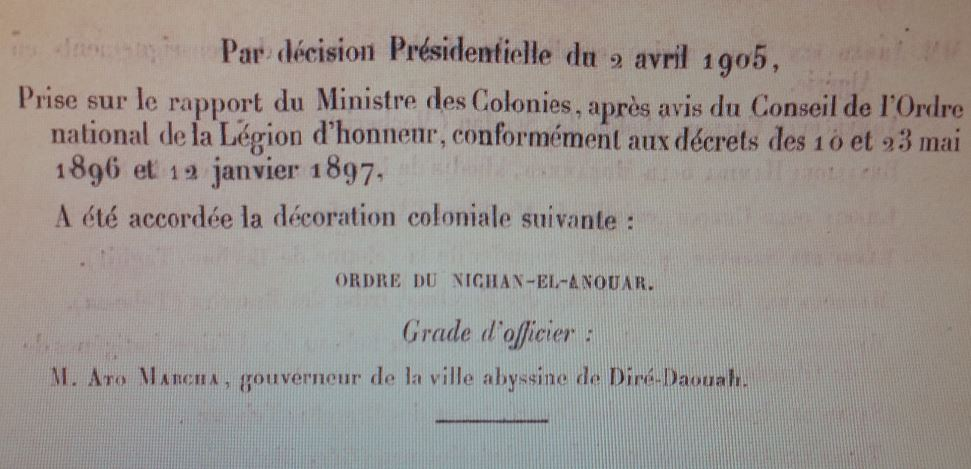
The Legion d'Honneur order given to Mersha in April 1905

=== Head of the first railway construction ===
The first and most significant example of European direct investment in Ethiopia was the construction of Ethiopia's first railway. The agreement to create a company for the construction of the railroad was first signed in 1894 between Menelik and Alfred Ilg. The primary European stakeholder was obviously France although British investors also owned shares and bonds at least until 1902 which is when the line reached Addis-Harar, later renamed Dire Dawa.

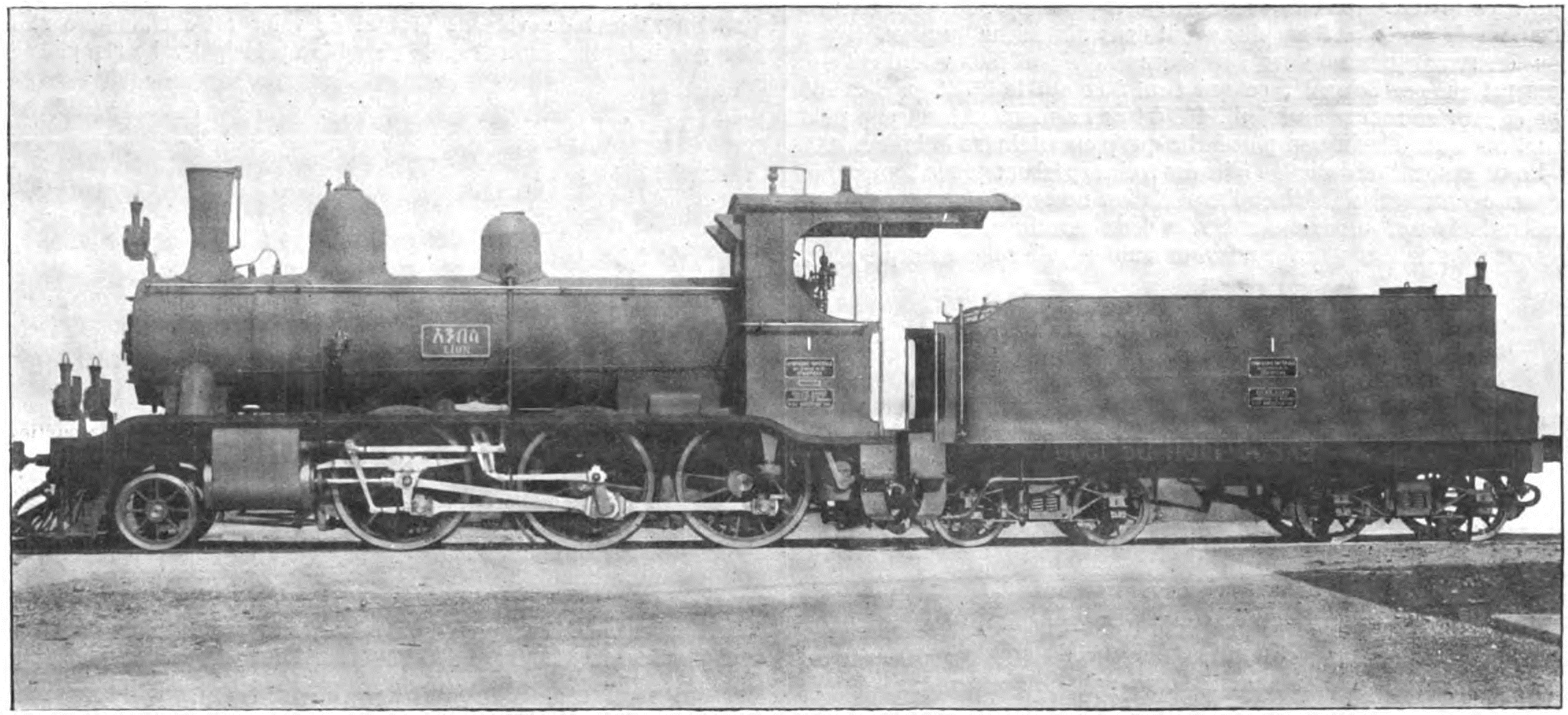
Ethiopia's first train Anbessa

Mersha was a key figure in the negotiations, construction and security of the railway during the initial phases of the project (1897–1911). When the Djibouti railroad reached the Ethiopian border town of Dewele (Dawale), in July 1900, he represented the emperor at the inaugural ceremony attended by a delegation of the French government led by Gabriel Louis Angoulvant, acting governor-general of the French Somaliland as well representatives of shareholders and other domestic and foreign diplomats, including Ato Yosef Zagalan, the Ethiopian consul in Djibouti and a dear friend of Mersha. According to one source, emperor Menelik himself was to be present, but he changed his mind later in protest of the growing interference by the French government in the affairs of the Compagnie Imperiale d'Ethiopie to which he granted concession. Things became worse and the construction was interrupted for several years following the completion of the Djibouti-Dire Dawa line. When the work resumed in 1909, Mersha was once again called to serve. The task given to him and other local officials was to oversee the extension of the meter-gauge line up to Awash. The railway reached Addis Abeba only in 1917. By then emperor Menelik had died and his daughter Zewditu was head of the empire.

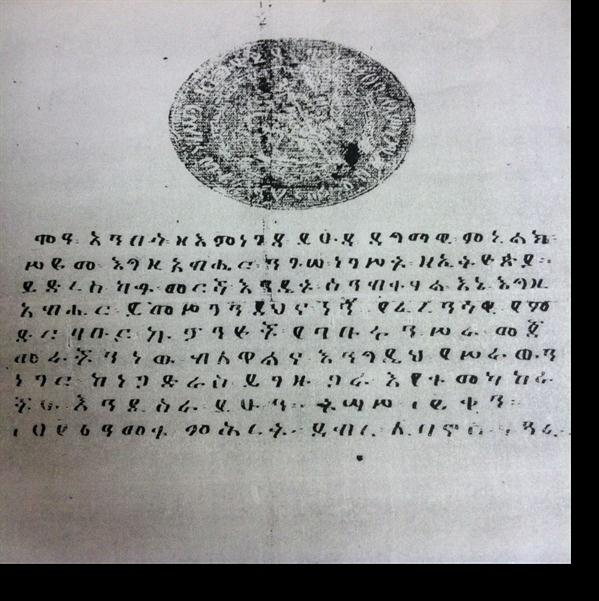
Emperor Menelik's letter to Mersha, written in December 1908

English translation of Menelik's letter to Mersha:

Dear Ato Mersha. How have you been? I, thank God, am well. Since the French railway companies informed me that they would resume construction, I would like you to manage the work in consultation with Negadras Yigezu. Written in the city of Debre Libanos on the 2nd day of Tahsas 1901.

(*The above letter has been included in the recent book titled 'Emperor Menilek's Domestic Letters' as letter #1898 (Paulos Gnogno collections); Aster Nega Publishers; 2010 p. 517).

The historian Richard Pankhurst called the first railway “the country’s greatest technological achievement of the period.” It led to rapid expansion of domestic and foreign trade. By cutting the amount of travel time to the coast in half, for example, the railroad increased the import and export of commodities drastically. It accelerated the process of urbanization as it paved the way to the rise of new settlements and villages and transformation of towns such as Harar and Addis Abeba. The movement of people from south to north and vice versa grew considerably. In short, the railway made life better for hundreds of thousands, if not millions, of Ethiopians. More importantly, it connected the country to the sea. Robert P Skinner, the diplomat who led the first US mission, in 1903–04, noted the following about the importance of the railway to the economy

The custom-house figures show a movement of importations and exportations in 1902 amounting $1,659,800, but, having in mind the methods of appraisement and the possibility of entering goods in contraband, it may be conservatively stated that the total trade under present conditions amounts to $3,000,000 per annum. Henceforth, this trade will grow rapidly, although the full power of the country will not be appreciated until the railroad is extended to the capital, 300 miles distant from its present terminus.

Spinner further observed:

When the railroad connecting the Empire and the sea was projected, a route was naturally selected which should give the greatest advantages to commerce...A town was created at this point, to which was given the name Dire Douah, and it has already become an important business center....

=== Pioneer and the first governor of Dire Dawa ===
The conclusion of the Djibouti-Dire Dawa railway, in 1902, marked the birth of Dire Dawa, the second largest city in Ethiopia. Shortly after, Mersha was ordered to move the Jaldessa custom house and his residence to the new terminus making him the first governor of the railway city. Not only he was at the right place at the right time, but this was a natural extension of his administrative responsibilities. Getahun Mesfin Haile, an expert on the history of Dire Dawa wrote:

Before the foundation of the town, the whole frontier region up to Dawale including the great environ of Dire Dawa used to be administered by a governor whose seat normally was at Jeldessa, a few km to the east of Dire Dawa. In 1902 the Governor was one Mersha Nahusenay, an educated and also French speaking personality, who took a considerable part in the foundation of the station and eventually of the town.

He went on to say;

The earliest town quarters of Käzira and Mägala, which sprang up following the establishment by the railway company of a station and its main workshop, soon evolved into the two most important nodes of economic, social and administrative activities of the new town. Käzira was built according to a regular plan and well provided with modern amenities. In the meantime, Ato Märsha Nahusänay, the first governor, and his followers, cleared and settled an area of land across from Käzira on the opposite side of the Dächatu that was largely covered with dense brush and cacti then. Growing out of this nucleus the larger quarter of Mägala took shape by degrees. In fact, the present quarter of Dächatu used to be known as Gändä-Märsha in the past in honor of its illustrious resident and founder.

Thus, it didn't take long before residential communities appeared and roads, offices and workshops as well as other critical facilities were built under the leadership of Leon Chefneux and Mersha. In the first several years of its founding, residents of the new town and the Franco-Ethiopian railway company were able to lay the foundation for what later became a French-style, cosmopolitan city. Sadly, unlike other towns, foreigners and locals did not live in the same area. Kezira or Gezira became a European quarter while Megala was inhabited by natives.

Richard Pankhurst called Dire Dawa “Ethiopia’s first modern town". Not only Dire Dawa was built differently than other towns of the time, but its administration was also unique. Historian Shiferaw Bekele noted:

The officials shared certain important characteristics which sharply set them apart from the general run of Ethiopian officialdom at the time… Almost in every province, one would meet one or two men who belonged to this category. However, in no other much concentration as in Dire Dawa.

Shiferaw, who is an expert on the early history of Dire Dawa, went on to say:

The Dire Dawan officialdom invariably spoke at least one European language. Even the earliest, Mersha, spoke French. A good number of them were highly educated. Afework Gebre Yesus and Gebre Hiwot Baykedagn who were the directors of Customs had had long years of stay in Europe where they had attained a tertiary level education. Beshah Wured was educated in the United States. The rest had gone to Mission schools.

Mersha served as governor from 1902 until 1906. He was in charge of administrative as well as judicial affairs. He even held courts "under a tree" in the early years of his tenure. He was succeeded by Ato Negatu Gugsa. The Dire Dawa municipality did not emerge until sometime between 1915 and 1920.

=== Chief of railway security ===
The agreements signed by the Ethiopian government and the railway company required Ethiopia to deploy a police force to safeguard the line and safety of employees. The mission was extremely dangerous due to local hostilities. Mersha became head of railway security full-time in 1906. His strategy for success included working with local chiefs and leaders. In fact he also assumed the position of chief of the Issa territory which much of the opposition to the construction came from. Shiferaw Bekele wrote:

As the governor of the province through with the line passed, he (i.e. Ato Mersha) was responsible for the peace and security of the line. He posted detachments of troops all along the line. He carried out negotiations with all the important chiefs of the Afar and Somali tribes in the region. He received orders from Ras Mekonnen and from Menelik.

He was in charge of the recruitment, training of the security personnel; negotiated their wage with the company; and settled disputes. He had always been the middle man between the railway company and Ethiopians. That involved making sure that the company honored its contractual obligations as well. As early as September 1900, for example, Mr. J. Gerolimato, the British consul agent in Harar, sent the following message to his boss, James Hayes Sadler, the Consul-General of the British-Somaliland:

Dear Sir: BEFORE yesterday, Atto Marcha, Governor of Jildessa, who was in Jibuti arrived here. There were in Daranli (i.e., Dawale) 200 Abyssinians to protect the line against the Essa (i.e., Issa), the Company paying 12 dollars per month for each Abyssinian soldier; now the Company paid them 8 dollars, instead of 12 dollars, and the Abyssinians have withdrawn these 200 men.

His prior experience as chief of Harar police must have prepared him for the challenges of the position. The railway police was in charge of stability and peace in the railway city and its surroundings as well. which he held until the mid-1920s with the exception of his brief dismissal by Lij Iyasu in 1916.

=== The Dawn of Modernization ===
The desire to introduce European style modernization was not unique to Emperor Menelik II. However, it was under him that the country took important practical steps in terms of establishing modern institutions and structure of governance. Transport and communication got a huge boost. The first telephone and telegraph were introduced following the first railway. Major roads were built and bicycles and automobiles appeared for the first time. The tax system was restructured. A modern monetary system was created. The first bank (Bank of Abyssinia) was established. A national currency was launched. The governance system underwent significant reorganization. The first cabinet of ministers was formed. Each of the six districts had two judges appointed by Menelik himself. The position of a supreme judge was created. The first public schools; the first newspaper, the first hotels, the first hospitals and post offices emerged. The list goes on. Although Mersha was principally involved in the construction of the railway and establishment of "modern" customs, he also participated in other important reforms such as the creation of postal and telegraph services.

After Menelik died in 1913, following a long illness, his grandson Iyasu V became the de facto ruler. Mersha was about sixty years of age at the time.

During his brief reign (1913–1916), Iyasu seems to have continued some of the reforms that he inherited. However, he also made political miscalculations resulting in his removal from power. In 1915, for example, Iyasu appointed Hasib Ydlibi (or Idlibi), a Syrian merchant of Turkish citizenship, as governor of Dire Dawa and Neggadras of Harar. The appointment was kept secret from Dejazmach Teferi (Tafari) Mekonnen, his cousin and governor of Harar Province. But then in July 1916, a few months before his ouster, Iyasu took the unprecedented step of deposing Teferi from his governorship creating further tensions between them and leading to anger in a province traditionally governed by that family.

Iyasu also seem to have chosen a foreign policy which sought to alienate traditional allies such as France and strengthen relations with Germany and Turkey (then Ottoman Empire). Perhaps because of that, he went on to remove Mersha from his post at the railway and replace him with Abubakar Mahammad, another important historic figure in Ethiopian history. Ironically, just months before their dismissal, both Dejach Teferi and Mersha had accompanied Iyasu during his trip to the region along with a number of other notables, including Mikael Berru (a German educated, British agency interpreter and father of the Sorbonne graduate Lij Seifu Mikael) and Tesemma Eshete. The radical changes were quickly picked up by foreign media.

The sudden change was picked up by international media and largely interpreted as a plan to favor Muslims over Christians, a sentiment shared by many in the country.

Suddenly, at the end of last July, Yasu left Adis Abeba for Harrar and came on to Jibuti on August 8th, where he renewed his protestations of friendship to M. Simoni, Governor of French Somaliland .... He was found to have deposed Prince Taffari, son of Ras Makonnen, from the Governorship of Harrar and substituted a Muhammadan... Intrigue was rampant at Harrar under the Turk Ydlibi; and finally the chief of the Issas, Ato Marcha, was deposed in favour of a Muhammadan. These events caused a stir at Adis Abeba. The legations of the Entente Powers also sent in a protest. And on September 27th...Lij Yasu was formally deposed.

The situation, however, was much more complex than what the reports claimed. There is no doubt that Iyasu tried to nurture close relations with the Muslim community and was married Fatima, the daughter of Abubakar, raising questions about his intentions and vision. Abubakar came from a family of rich Muslim Afar traders who made enormous contributions to Menelik commercially, administratively and diplomatically. His father, Mahammad (also Negaddras) was the governor of the historic town of Aliyu Amba (Shoa Province) while he himself served as the governor of Shenno, another commercial center. His grandfather, Abubakar Ibrahim Chehem, was a notable statesman and Sultan or Pasha of Somalia's port city of Zeila (Zeyla) before it became part of the British Somaliland.

In contrast, some scholars argue today that the new policies were all part of Iyasu's efforts to consolidate the imperial power such as by integrating marginal territories such as the Afar land.

From the end of the 19th century, the members of this family lost their role as obligatory intermediaries in favour of European traders supported by their respective states. However, one of them, Naggadras Mahammad Abubakar, continued to enjoy the trust of Menelik, who was unwilling to rely solely on the Europeans.

Furthermore, although Mersha was Christian, he did not adhere to the historically dominant Orthodox faith. Rather he was one of the first to convert to Catholicism and subjected to mistreatment like many of his fellow worshippers.

Mersha's absence was a source of great concern to the railway company in part due to his long and dedicated service and reputation. This was obvious from one of the letters that Emperor Menelik wrote to him. The following comment made by Mr. de Mazérieux, the company's administrator, captures that sentiment:

Avec Ato Marcha, qui était au courant des usages et des méthodes de la Cie, et qui lui était surtout absolumment dévoué, les difficultés etaient rapidement aplanies. Abou-Baker est trop connu en Abyssinie et à la Cie, pour qu’on puisse espérer, qu’il en sera de même avec lui.

English translation:

With Ato Marcha, who had experience with the practices and methods of the Compagnie Imperiale d’Ethiopie (CIE), operational difficulties were resolved more quickly. Abu-Baker is also known within Abyssinia and CIE, and similar outcomes were anticipated following his involvement.

Mersha was restored to his position under Empress Zewditu, Menelik's daughter, who ruled Ethiopia from 1916 until 1930. Teferi Mekonnen was regent to the throne during this period and went on to rule Ethiopia as Emperor Haile Selassie I(1930–1974) when the empress died.

=== A prominent Catholic ===
Mersha was a well-known Catholic. He played an important role in the spread of the faith in Harar region and beyond. His wife Tedeneqyalesh was the daughter of Ato Mekbeb (also Mekev, Makeb and Makbeb) who was converted to Catholicism in the late 1860s by the Italian missionary Cardinal Guglielmo Massaja or Abba Messias as he was known in Ethiopia. Martial De Salviac, the French missionary who lived in Ethiopia at the end of the 19th century, wrote the following:

The one which Menelik called 'a man of my confidence', that was Ato Makeb, officer of the royal house. He soon earned the confidence of missionaries by becoming an edified Catholic. Later he gave his daughter in marriage to one of the better students of the mission, Ato Marsha, who was a police chief in Harar, and actually directed the customs at Jaldessa.

It is not surprising that Mersha's children were brought up Catholics. Benito Sylvain, the Haitian lawyer, author and anti-slavery activist who visited Ethiopia a few times during the late 19th and early 20th century wrote:

En l'absence de Ras Makonnen, retenu par l'Empereur à Addis-Abeba, pour la conclusion du traité de paix avec l'Italie, était le Ghérazmatch Banti qui remplissait les délicates fonctions de gouverneur. Il manifesté de cordiale faҫon sa joie de me voir et après avoir vidé le tedj ou hydromel de l'amitié, il me fit donner l'hospitalité chez Ato Marcha, chef des douanes de Guieldessa, dont tous les enfants sont élevés à la Mission catholique française que dirige actuellement le sympathique Mgr André, récemment promu Evèque.

English translation:

In the absence of Ras Mekonnen, kept by the Emperor in Addis Ababa, for the conclusion of the peace treaty with Italy was the Gerazmatch Banti who filled the delicate functions of governor. He expressed in a cordial way his joy to see me, and after emptying the tedj or mead of friendship, he offered me hospitality at the residence of Ato Marcha, Chief of Customs of Gildessa, with all the children raised in the French Catholic Mission currently headed by the friendly Mgr André who was recently promoted Bishop.

Mission schools such as those founded by the French missionary Andre Jarosseau (Abba Endryas) trained a generation of young Ethiopians. Recent biographies (e.g. Ras Emru Haile Selassie) shed light on the importance of these schools. In his autobiography, Captain Alemayehu Abebe, one of the pioneers of Ethiopian aviation and the first black African pilot of a commercial jet airliner, wrote:

አቶ መርሻ ከነቤተሰቦቻቸው በሐረር ከተማ የታወቁና የተከበሩ የካቶሊክ ሃይማኖት ተከታይ ስለነበሩ ምንሴኘር አንድሬ ዣሩሶ በሚያስተዳድሩት የካቶሊክ ሚሲዮን ገብቼ በአዳሪነት እንድማር ተደረገ

English translation:

Since Ato Mersha, along with his family, was a well-known and respected follower of the Catholic faith in the city Harar, I was allowed to attend the mission school headed by Mgr Andre Jarousseau.

Another important biography by Mickael Bethe-Selassié describes in detail the historic contributions of Catholic Ethiopians during the first half of the 20th century. Many, including Mersha Nahusenay and the author's uncle Berhane-Marqos Welde-Tsadiq, played a role in the modernization efforts of Emperors Menelik and Haile Selassié. The biographer argues that these Catholics form a distinct sub-group within the larger community of educated men also known as La Jeune Ethiopie. However, the historic ties between Catholic and Orthodox Christian intellectuals have also been stressed by Mickael as well other scholars.

The Ethiopian Roman Catholic community, the first of whose members were converted in the late 19th century by Italian or French missionaries, such as Guglielmo Massaia and André Jarosseau, included Zäwgä Haylu, who attended the Paris Exposition Universelle of 1900, and Märsha Nahu Sänay, who represented Menelik at the ceremony marking the completion of the Jibuti railway as far as the Ethiopian frontier in 1902. The community thus came into existence at the very same time as the emergence of the Young Ethiopians as a whole. The Catholic community was moreover influenced by the same factors - missionary education, travel to France or Italy, employment by foreigners, service on the railway, etc. -which gave birth, as we have seen, more generally to Young Ethiopianism.

== Death and legacy ==
Mersha retired in the mid-1920s, but he maintained contact with friends such as the missionary A. Jarousseau, according to historian Bahru Zewde. His retirement comes after a long public service with important contributions in four key areas: border and railway security, public administration, economic development and diplomacy. He soon fell ill and was confined to bed for almost a decade. Mersha died in the early years of Italian occupation and was laid to rest in the city of Harar. He was about eighty five years of age.

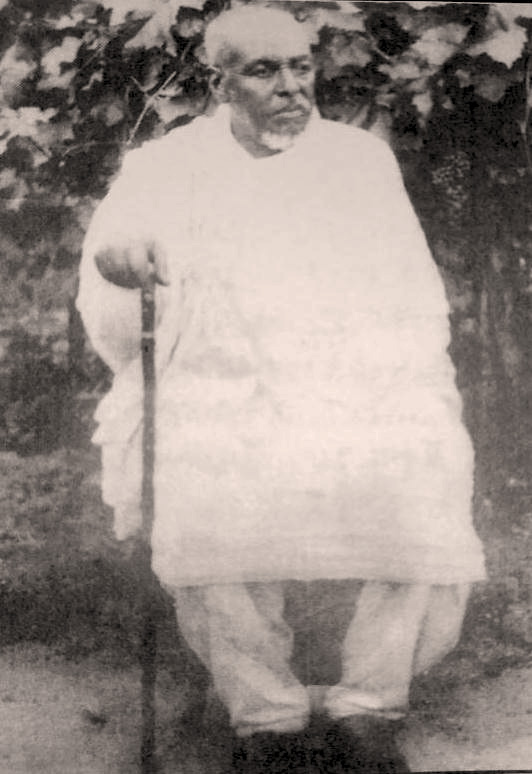
Mersha Nahusenay during retirement

Mersha nurtured a large family. He and his wife Tedeneqyalesh had eleven children: Beyene, Negest, Zewditu, Alemu, Worqe, Desta, Yosef, Marqos, Negatu, Zegeye, and Medemdemya. He encouraged his children to attend school and appreciate foreign languages. Beyene Mersha, his eldest child, spoke French fluently. Even his daughter (probably Zewditu) knew French. She read a welcome speech to Colonel Jean-Baptiste Marchand (1863–1934), the French officer and explorer who traveled through Harar in 1899, according to the missionary Martial de Salviac. Mersha loved take his family to important public events. Martial describes how Mersha, a proud father, attended the opening ceremony of the Dawale railway station in 1900 surrounded by "a beautiful crowd of eight children."

In the late 1890s, young Beyene, who was fluent in French, traveled to France and Italy with Andre Jarosseau. In 1903, on behalf of his father, he met in Dire Dawa with R.P. Skinner, the American diplomat sent by Theodore Roosevelt to sign a trade treaty with Menelik. Mersha himself was present, however, when the first-ever US diplomatic mission completed its visit and was preparing to leave Dire Dawa for Djibouti. In fact he conveyed a farewell message from the Emperor delivered over the phone from Addis.

Beyene Mersha was later appointed by the emperor as head of the postal and telephone service opened in the frontier town of Dawale. During the period of uncertainty, following the emperor death, he stood on the side of those who campaigned to deny Lej Iyasu the throne, under the leadership of Fitawrari Tekle Hawaryat. In 1931, 'balambaras' Beyene was appointed director of the first Ethiopian School for Girls founded in Addis Abeba by Empress Menen. Prior to that, he was a member of the board for construction of the Dessie-Asseb road, a project undertaken by a team of Dutch engineers.

Ato Denqu, husband of Negest Mersha, was appointed in 1907 as the chief of Dire Dawa's Post Office. He too traveled to Europe (e.g. Switzerland and Italy) to attend meetings of the International Postal Union after Ethiopia became a member in 1908. Many grandchildren and great-grandchildren live and work in Ethiopia and around the world. The most visible descendant today, Ato Abinet Gebremeskel, is a businessman and philanthropist in Ethiopia. Tadewos Assebework is the grandson of Zegeye Mersha and great-grandson of Ato Mersha.

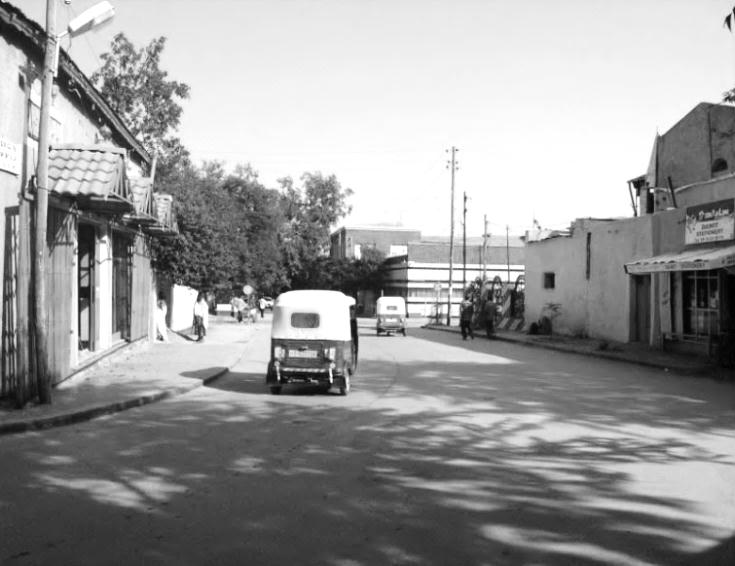
Mersha Nahusenay Street (Kezira, Dire Dawa)

Mersha's legacy includes a street named after him in Kezira (Gezira), a subsection of Dire Dawa during the reign of Emperor Haile Selassie. He was remembered and honored when the railway city celebrated its 105th anniversary in December 2007.

However, Mersha is still very much a forgotten hero. His biography remains unwritten and his distinguished service is poorly known by many scholars and students of Ethiopian history. In his book titled Pioneers of Change in Ethiopia: The reformist Intellectuals of the early twentieth century, Professor Bahru Zewde describes the contributions of many historic personalities of that dynamic era. The book does not mention Mersha as a pioneer. However, some of the reformist intellectuals discussed had either administered the offices he helped establish or occupied the positions he held before. Neggadras Gebrehiwot Baykedagn (c.1885-1918), arguably the foremost intellectual of the time, for example, was director of the Dire Dawa customs administration. Fitawrari Tekle Hawariat Tekle-Mariam (1884–1977), who later became governor of Jigjiga; credited for founding Asebe Teferi; and is best known for playing a prominent role in the drafting of the 1931 constitution, was chief of the railway station briefly during Lij Iyasu. He was also among the first Ethiopians to travel abroad for education. As a matter of fact, shortly before the young Tekle Hawaryat departed for Russia, in 1896, Mersha gave him his blessings. We find the following interesting account in his autobiography,:

ጄልዴሳ ላይ ስንደርስ አቶ መርሻ ናሁ ሰናይ ከቤታቸው ወስደው ጋበዙኝ ። ያስቀሩኛል ብዬ ፈርቼ በቶሎ ወጣሁና ወደ ሰፈሬ ሮጥኩ ። ፀሓይ እንዳይጎዳኝ አስበው አቶ መርሻ ጥላ ገዝተው ሰጡኝ ። (ከወንድሜ ከሟቹ ገብረ ጻድቅ ጋር በጣም ይፋቀሩ ነበር) (p. 78)

English translation:

When we arrived at Jaldessa, Ato Mersha invited me for lunch at his residence. Because I was afraid that he might not let me travel overseas, I ran away as soon as I finished. Ato Mersha, however, bought me an umbrella so I could protect myself from the scorching sun. (He and my deceased brother Gebre Tsadiq were dear friends).

The last few decades of the 19th century marked the beginning of a long period of modernization in Ethiopian history in the sense that they opened the door to new ways and better conditions of life and work. Significant achievements were recorded during the reign of Emperor Haile Selassie in areas such as manufacturing, transportation (e.g. aviation) and education. Trade and foreign direct investment continued to play a key role in the young economy. Despite some serious setbacks in the two decades after the 1974 popular revolution, primarily due to severe droughts and civil war but also poor policy choices, the country underwent a radical transformation. The revolution has ended the feudal (ባላባት) system paving the way for greater participation of people in political and economic activities. During the past several decades, Ethiopia has witnessed unprecedented growth characterized by a strong government sector, expanding private sector and major development of critical infrastructure (e.g. roads, new Djibouti-Addis railway, etc.). Whether or this momentum will be maintained in the long run, time will tell. Ethnic and religious tensions are increasingly undermining national unity and consensus-building often leading to tragic consequences. When all is said and done, however, much of the progress made over the last century is deeply rooted in the historic events and reforms of the late 19th – early 20th century.
