= Isola (surname) =

Isola is the surname of the following people

- Akinwunmi Isola (1939–2018), Nigerian playwright, actor, dramatist, culture activist and scholar
- Albert Isola (born 1963), Gibraltarian politician
- Amédée Isola (1898–1991), French runner
- Andrés Isola (born 1974), Olympic windsurfer from Uruguay
- Antonia Isola (1876–?), pseudonym of American writer Mabel Earl McGinnis
- Carlos Isola (1896–1964), Argentine footballer
- Émile Isola (1860–1945), French conjurer and theatre director
- Federica Isola (born 1999), Italian fencer
- Floris Isola (born 1991), French association football player
- Frank Isola (1925–2004), American jazz drummer
- Frank Isola (sportswriter), American sportswriter
- Giuseppe Isola (1808–1893), Italian painter
- Johnny Dell Isola (1912–1986), American football player
- Maija Isola (1927–2001), Finnish textile designer
- Peter Isola (1929–2006), Gibraltarian politician and lawyer, father of Albert
- Paul Isola, Gibraltarian musician and songwriter
- Vincent Isola (1862–1947), French conjurer and theatre director, brother of Émile
