= Vorstius =

Vorstius or Vorst is a Dutch and German surname, a Latinized from of "Vorst". Notable people with the surname include:

- Aelius Everhardus Vorstius (1565-1624) Dutch physician, botanist and professor at Leiden University
- Conrad Vorstius (1569–1622) German-Dutch heterodox Remonstrant theologian, and professor of theology at Leiden University.
- Adolphus Vorstius (1597–1663) Dutch physician and botanist, son of Aelius Everhardus
