= Jaldessa =

- Town
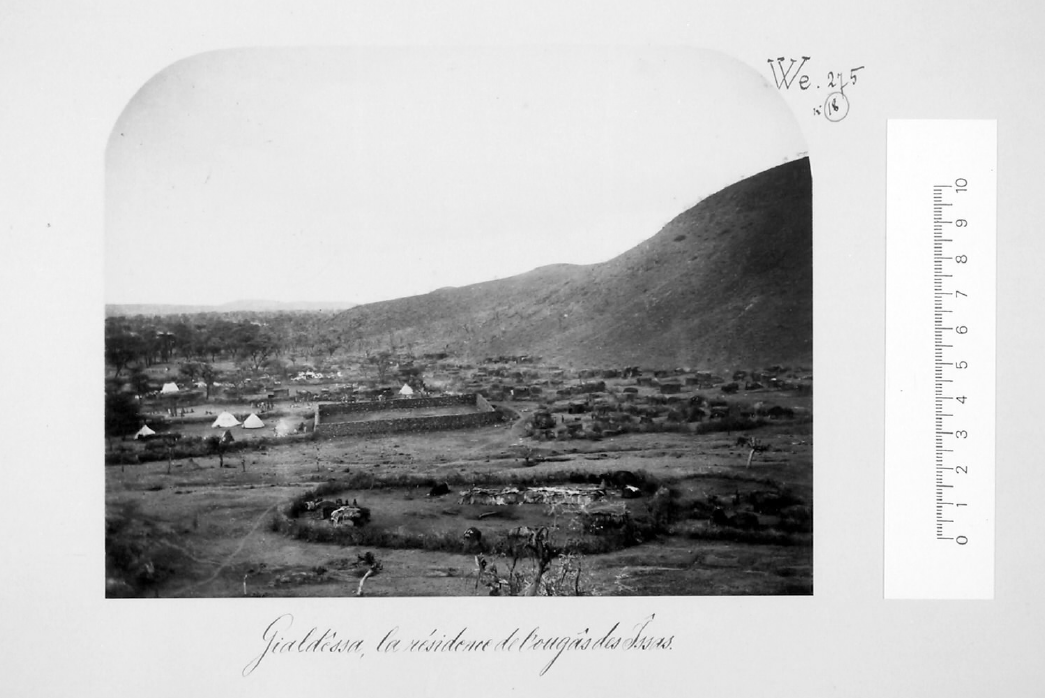
- Jaldessa in 1885

- Location in Ethiopia
- Coordinates: 09°43′00″N 42°08′00″E
- Country: Ethiopia
- Region: Somali Region
- District: Sitti Zone
- Time zone: UTC+3 (EAT)
- Climate: BSh

Jaldessa (also transliterated Jeldessa, Gildessa, Guildessa, Gheldessa) is a village in eastern Ethiopia. Located in the Shinile Zone of the Somali Region of Ethiopia.

The Central Statistical Agency has not published an estimate for the population of this village. It is located in Shinile woreda.

== History ==
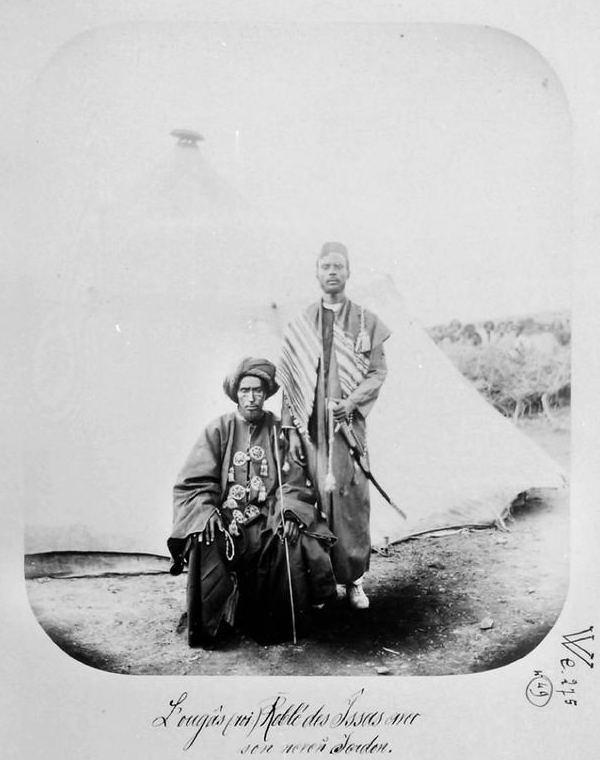
Issa Ugaas Rooble pictured with his nephew Jardon in 1885

In its early history the area of Jaldessa was part of the Emirate of Harar. W.C. Barker, writing in 1842, mentions it as a stopping place in the territory of the Nole Oromo, on the caravan route between Zeila and Harar.

The present-day town of Jaldessa (45 km north of Harar), was founded in 1875 by the Egyptians who set up a fort to secure supply from the coast and stationed a contingent of Sudanese soldiers with an Egyptian officer. Jaldessa then became an important station along the trade route between Harar and the Red Sea coast. A market was set up and people built huts around the station, which was fortified with stones and hedgerows, the Somali on one side and the Oromo on the other. The Ughaz of Issa, Roble Farah, moved his seat to Jaldessa. Its population increased to 1,500 and doubled or tripled on market days. After the Egyptians left Harar in 1885, Britain took possession of Jaldessa and stationed a garrison of 19 Indians and 20 Somalis, however, these soldiers were soon imprisoned by the troops of Amir Abdullahi who took control of the area. The party of Italian explorer Count Pietro Porro was ambushed and slaughtered at Jaldessa in April 1886, which provided Menelik II of Shewa with an excuse to attack Harar. Between the Shewan victory at Chelenqo and the foundation of Dire Dawa, Jaldessa was the seat of the various governors, such as the Armenian Sarkis Terzian and later Ato Mersha Nahusenay. The opening of the Addis Ababa - Djibouti Railway and the birth of Dire Dawa diminished the strategic importance of Jaldessa.

Early in the Ogaden War, Jaldessa was captured by Somali units as they closed in on Dire Dawa; it was recaptured 4 February 1978 by the Ethiopian Ninth Division with Cuban tank and artillery shock troops.

In 2008, the United States of America selected Jaldessa as one of seven locations where servicemen of the Combined Joint Task Force-Horn of Africa worked with Ethiopian veterinarians to vaccinate more than 20,000 animals: cattle were inoculated against blackleg and anthrax, while sheep and goats were inoculated against contagious caprine pleuro-pneumonia and peste des petits ruminants.

== Ruins ==
Archaeologist Timothy Insoll, states the existence of a caravanserai and a mosque in Jaldessa.

== See also ==
- Issa
- Zeila
- Harar
- Somali aristocratic and court titles
