= Bessie Van Vorst =

American author and journalist

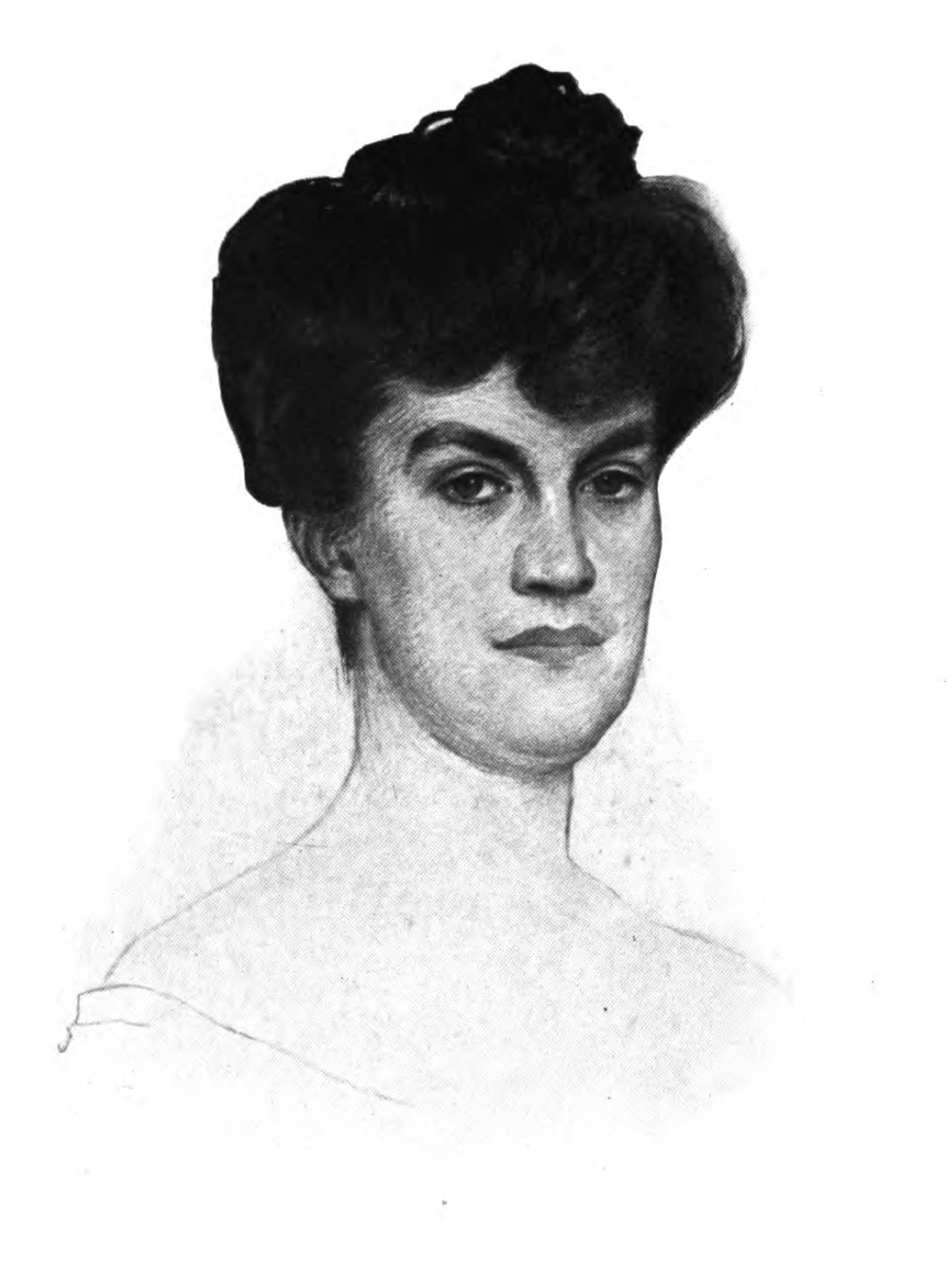
- Born: Bessie McGinnis; September 2, 1873; New York City, U.S.
- Died: May 19, 1928 (aged 54); Paris, France
- Other names: Mrs. John Van Vorst
- Occupations: journalist, writer
- Known for: women and children's labor studies
- Notable work: The Woman Who Toils: Being the Experiences of Two Gentlewomen as Factory Girls

Bessie Van Vorst (née McGinnis; September 2, 1873 – May 19, 1928), also known as Mrs. John Van Vorst, was an American author and journalist. She is best known as a co-author of the magazine series and the book The Woman Who Toils: Being the Experiences of Two Ladies as Factory Girls (1903) with a preface by US President Theodore Roosevelt, an influential example of social investigation. Her study of women and child labor in the mills of Alabama and New Hampshire helped stir reform sentiment.

== Early life and family ==
Bessie McGinnis was born in 1873 in New York City. She was educated in New York private schools. In 1898, she started working for the New York Evening Post. In 1899, she married John Van Vorst. The marriage lasted only twelve hours – it was the groom's last wish to marry the bride before his death. His father Judge Hopper Cornelius Van Vorst was a president of the Holland Society and served on the United States Circuit Court. Upon her husband's death, she moved to Paris with her sister-in-law Marie Van Vorst, and the two co-authored the novel Bagsby's Daughter, published in 1901.

== Undercover investigations ==
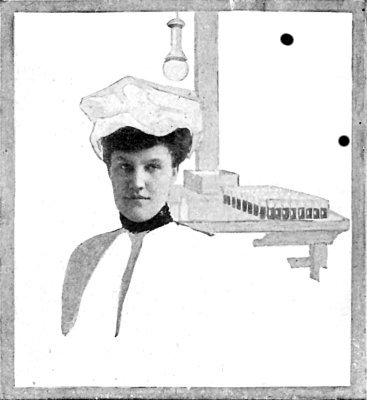
Van Vorst as "Esther Kelly" wearing the costume of the pickle factory

In 1901. Bessie and Marie Van Vorst began an undercover investigation into women and child factory laborers by finding jobs in factories under aliases. Bessie worked in a plant in Perry, New York, a knitting mill near Buffalo, and a Pittsburgh pickle factory, among other places, using the name "Esther Kelly". Marie Van Vorst found employment in a shoe factory in Lynn, Massachusetts, and a cotton mill in Columbia, South Carolina, under the alias "Bell Ballard". The Van Vorsts began writing a column detailing their experiences in Everybody's Magazine.

Their writings attracted the attention of the President of the United States, Theodore Roosevelt, who was interested in demographic issues. He wrote a letter to Bessie Van Vorst in 1902. Roosevelt's primary concern in his letter was race suicide that he believed was more important than any other issue in the country.

When the publisher saw the letter he asked Van Vorst to compile her magazine work on laboring women into a book and use the president's note for the preface. In 1903, Roosevelt's preface appeared in Van Vorsts' book The Woman Who Toils: Being the Experiences of Two Ladies as Factory Girls – a book form of the magazine series. One part of the letter in particular caused a sensation among Americans who were not used to seeing any president address such issues as demography and birth control:

If a man or woman, through no fault of his or hers, goes throughout life denied those highest of all joys which spring only from home life, from the having and bringing up of many healthy children, I feel for them deep and respectful sympathy; the sympathy one extends to the gallant fellow killed at the beginning of a campaign, or the man who toils hard and is brought to ruin by the fault of others. But the man or woman who deliberately avoids marriage, and has a heart so cold as to know no passion and a brain so shallow and selfish as to dislike having children, is in effect a criminal against the race, and should be an object of contemptuous abhorrence by all healthy people.

Roosevelt's outcry struck a chord with many Americans. His criticism of voluntary childlessness was accepted by many citizens at that time and helped change the way families were depicted in mass media emphasizing the children. The idea of race suicide would become a favorite Roosevelt topic on his lecture tours, in which he urged white women to have babies.

In their book the Van Vorsts portrayed the troublesome working and living conditions they had observed, and their consequences for women and girls. Bessie appealed for a more compassionate attitude towards these employees. Van Vorst also noted that factory women enjoyed the independence afforded them by paid labor and therefore delayed marrying. "I never saw a baby nor heard of a baby while I was in town", Van Vorst wrote after nearly three weeks spent in Perry. She also discussed sociability and the discipline of factory work as a dangerous alternative to family unity.

The book, with the same title and title page but containing only Bessie's contributions, was reprinted in 1974.

Some contemporary authors criticize Bessie and Marie Van Vorst for having a condescending attitude toward the working class, and indeed they themselves described working-class women as "degrading to look upon and odorous to approach".

Sociologist Carolin Auer, in a 2000 essay on "social reportage", criticizes Bessie and Marie Van Vorst for the simulated reality they create. Auer claims that the women's undercover investigation is nothing but a simulation of the reality as the researchers remain untrammeled by the economic, educational, and emotional ties which bind female factory workers. She notes that equating a life among the Other with the life of the Other is erroneous. Therefore, the Van Vorsts' efforts result in "false representations" as they produce a fragmentary and flawed account of the worker's world, as well as represent a report of what is actually a fake world. Auer calls their narrative constructed when describing encounters, situations and events.

== Later work ==
In 1908, Van Vorst wrote the book The Cry of the Children, in which she described child labor in wool and cotton mills in New Hampshire and Alabama. She conducted her study through visits to the Dwight Manufacturing Company in Alabama City, the Massachusetts Cotton Mill in Lindale, Georgia, and the Merrimack Manufacturing Company in Huntsville. Everywhere she traveled she saw children of twelve years and younger working as doffers or sweepers, earning between twenty and fifty cents for a twelve-hour workday and often working night shifts. Her book was illustrated by drawings by Guernsey Moore, a well-known illustrator who was responsible for Saturday Evening Post covers. Van Vorst's study of child labor in the mills of Alabama and New Hampshire helped stir reform sentiment.

== Move to Paris ==
Van Vorst settled in Paris among the expatriate American community. In 1914, she married Hugues Robert Charles Henri Le Roux, a writer and editor of Le Matin. Van Vorst continued writing on social issues as a correspondent for US and French publications, including Harper's Magazine, Revue des deux Mondes, and Journal des débats.

Van Vorst died on May 19, 1928, in Paris.

== Selected publications ==
- 1901 – Bagsby's daughter
- 1903 – The woman who toils: being the experiences of two gentlewomen as factory girls
- 1903 – L'ouvrière aux États-Unis
- 1904 – The issues of life: a novel of the American woman of today
- 1907 – Magda, queen of Sheba, from the ancient royal Abyssinian manuscript, "The glory of the kings" — translator
- 1908 – The cry of the children; a study of child-labor
- 1918 – Popular history of France
- 1918 – On the field of honor (Au champ d'honneur)
- 1918 – A popular history of the war from 1914 to 1918
- 1919 – A popular geography of France, industries, principal cities
- 1919 – To the homeward-bound Americans
- 1926 – A girl from China (Soumay Tcheng) — translator
