= Marie Van Vorst =

American writer (1867–1936)

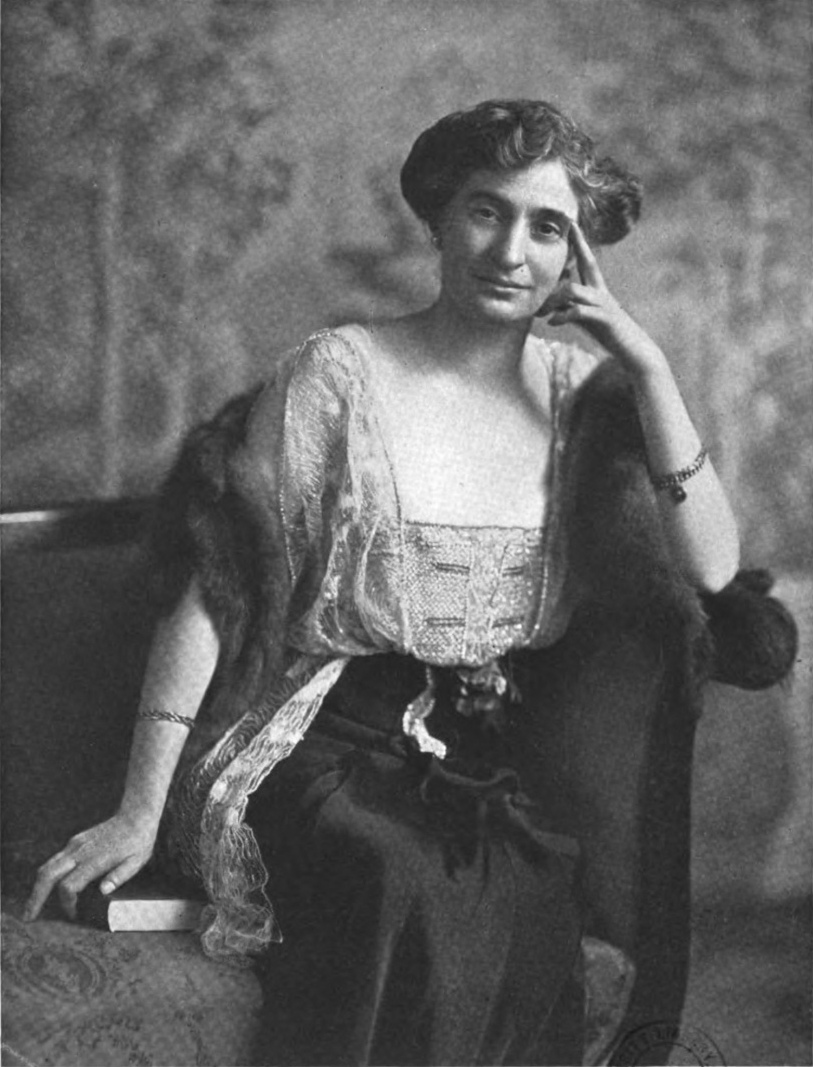
Van Vorst featured in Book News Monthly in 1915

Marie Louise Van Vorst (November 23, 1867 – December 16, 1936) was an American writer, researcher, painter, and volunteer nurse during World War I.

== Early life ==
Marie Louise Van Vorst was born in New York City, the daughter of Hooper Cumming Van Vorst and Josephine Adele Treat Van Vorst. Her father was a judge on the New York City Superior Court and president of the Century Club.

== Career ==
Van Vorst and her widowed sister-in-law, Bessie Van Vorst, moved to France and co-wrote novels together, including Bagsby's Daughter (1901). For The Woman Who Toils: Being the Experiences of Two Ladies as Factory Girls (1903), they went undercover at a pickle factory in Pittsburgh; a textile mill outside Buffalo, New York; a variety of sweat shops in Chicago; a shoe factory in Lynn, Massachusetts; and a Southern cotton mill to learn about working women's lives. The book's introduction was written by Theodore Roosevelt. Marie Van Vorst also wrote regularly for Harper's Magazine, Good Housekeeping, and other national publications.

Van Vorst's books include Philip Longstreth (1902), Poems (1903), Amanda of the Mill (1905), Miss Desmond (1905), The Sins of George Warrener (1906), The Sentimental Adventures of Jimmy Bulstrode (1908), In Ambush (1909), First Love (1910), The Girl from His Town (1910), The Broken Bell (1912), His Love Story (1913), Big Tremaine (1914), Mary Moreland (1915), Fairfax and His Bride (1920), Tradition (1921), The Queen of Karmania (1922), Goodnight Ladies! (1931), and The Gardenia (1933). Three of her novels were adapted for silent films before 1920.

During World War I, she volunteered as a field hospital worker at Neuilly-sur-Seine and Paris, and wrote War Letters of an American Woman (1916) about her experiences in the war zone. In the same year she published a book of poetry, War Poems (1916). She returned to the United States to give lectures and raise funds for American ambulances in France. In 1918, she took charge of a postwar relief organization in Italy. In 1922, Van Vorst was encouraged by artist Mary Foote to take up painting, and exhibited her art in New York City.

== Personal life ==
Van Vorst in 1916 married widower Count Gaetano Cagiati in Paris in a small wedding ceremony at Notre Dame Cathedral. She later adopted a war orphan, a son she named Frederick John Barth Van Vorst. In 1936, while in Florence, Italy, she died of pneumonia at the age of 69.

== Gallery ==
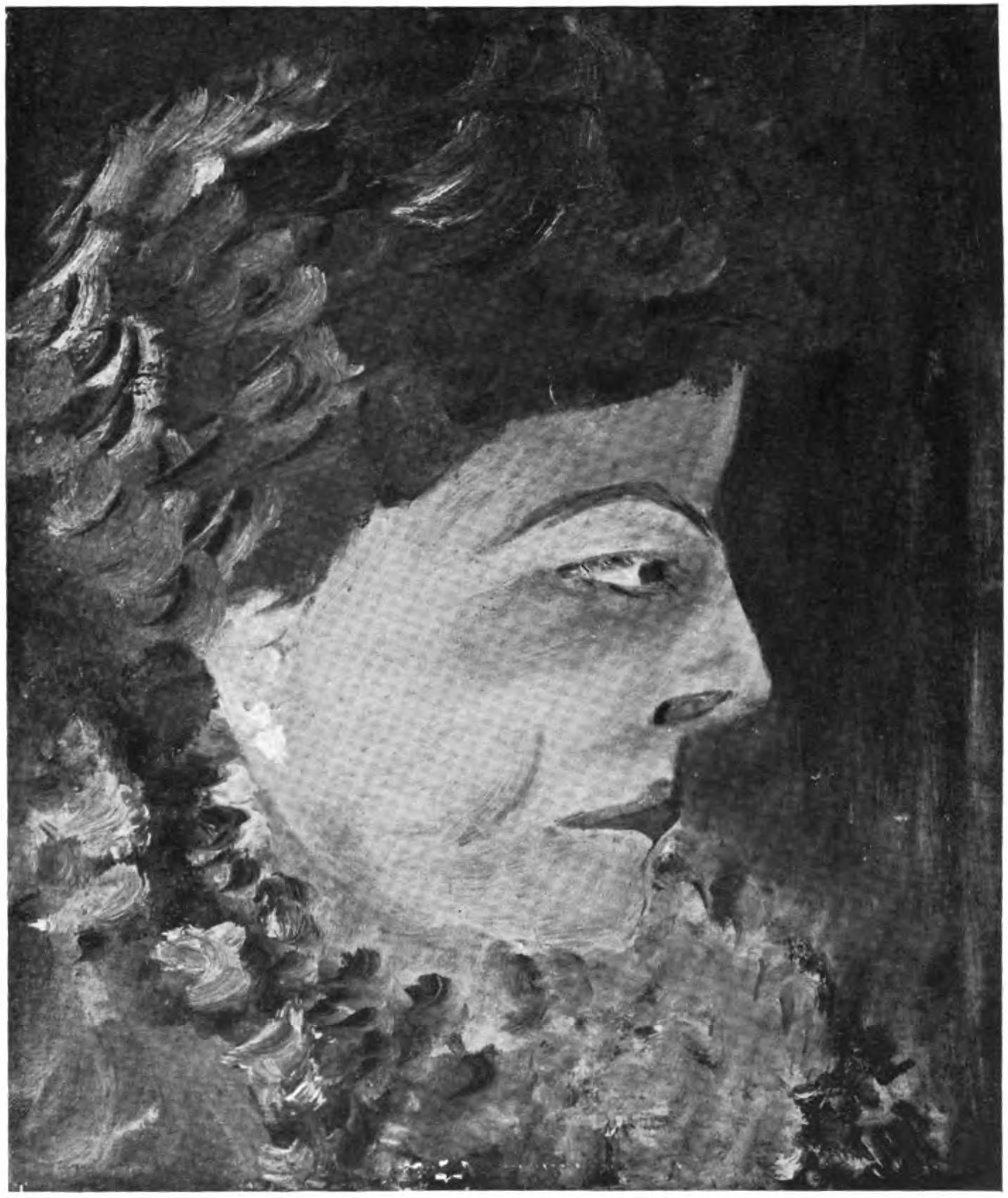
The Grey Boa by Marie Van Vorst, published in 1923

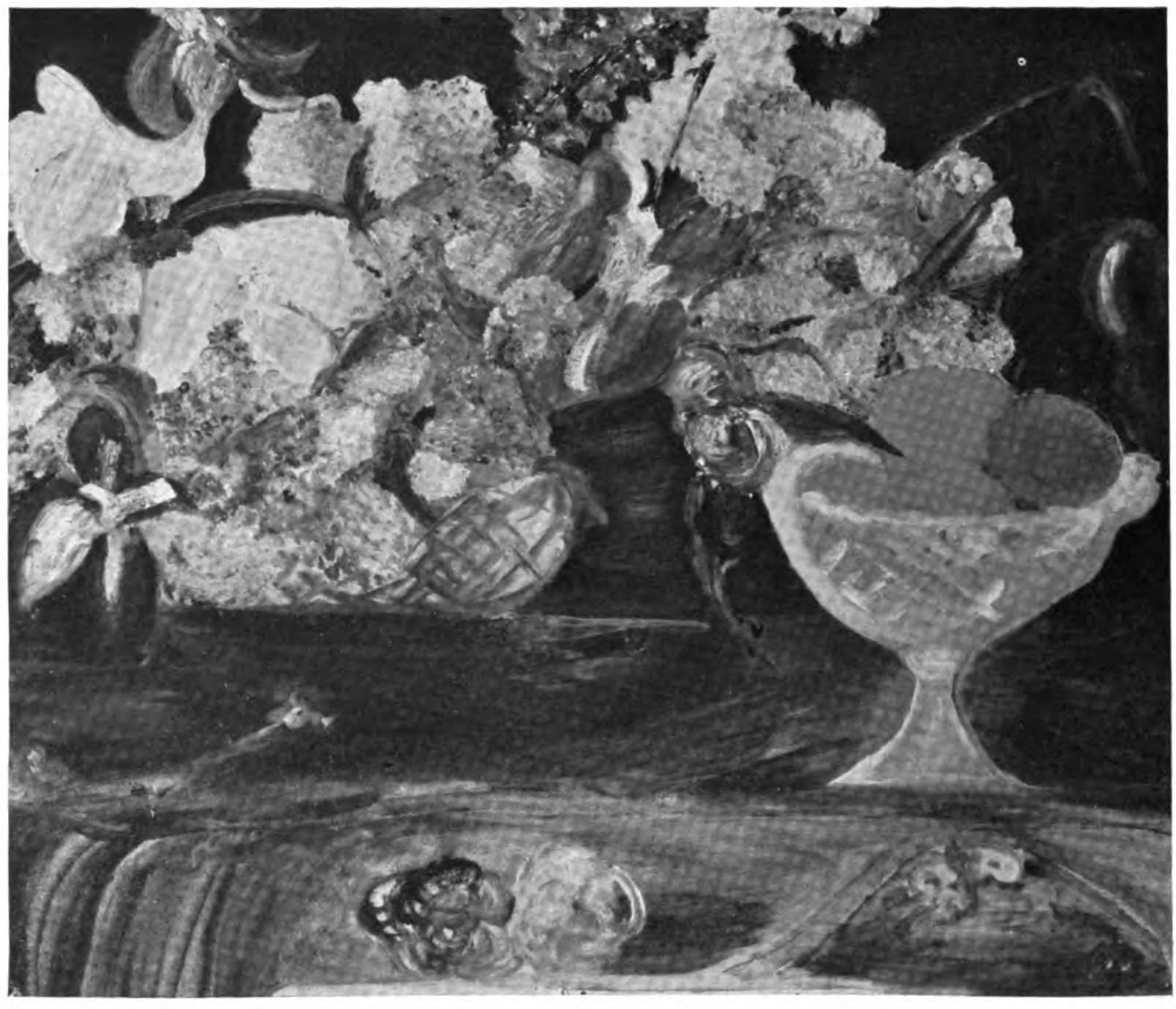
London Pride by Marie Van Vorst, published in 1923
