= Van der Vorst =

van der Vorst is a Dutch surname. Notable people with the surname include:

- Henk van der Vorst (born 1944), Dutch mathematician
- Monique van der Vorst (born 1984), Dutch cyclist
- Patrick van der Vorst (born 1971), entrepreneur
