= Hugues Le Roux =

French writer and journalist (1860–1925)

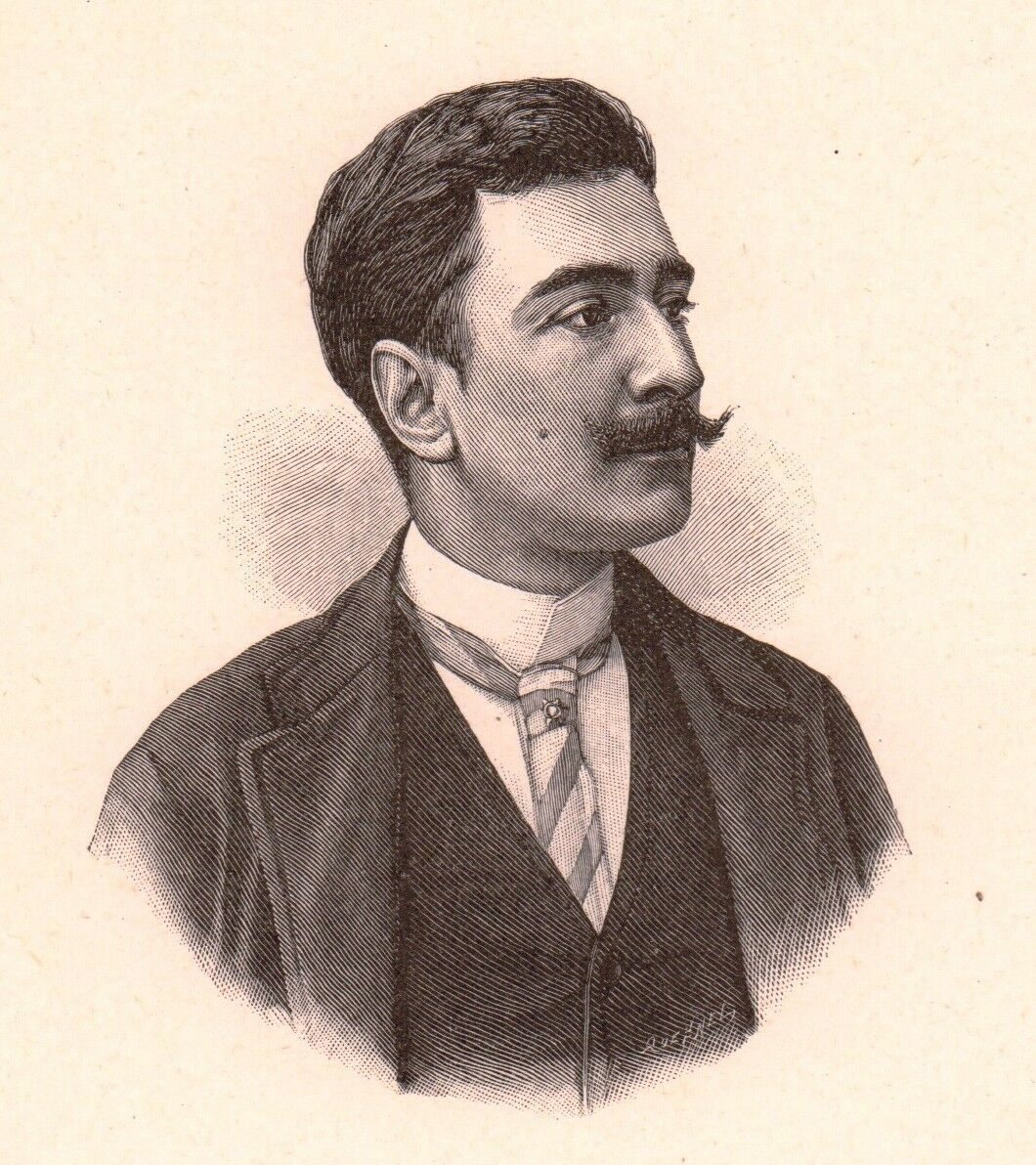
- Born: Robert Charles Henri Le Roux; 1860
- Died: 1925 (aged 64–65)

Robert Charles Henri Le Roux (1860–1925), known by the pen name Hugues Le Roux, was a French writer and journalist. He wrote primarily about the French colonies and travel.

== Early life ==
He was the son of Charles Clovis Le Roux and Henriette Gourgaud. Robert was a journalist for "La Revue Politique et Littéraire," "Le Temps," "Le Figaro," "Le Journal," and "Le Matin." In addition, Robert Charles wrote books and novels.

On 11 January 1920, he became a senator until his death on 14 November 1925. Earlier in his career, he was the private secretary of Alphonse Daudet. He had written for Daudet, "La belle Nivernaise" and "Tartarin sur les Alpes"

== Work ==
- L'Attentat Sloughine, J. Lévy, Paris, 1885
- Médéric et Lisée, J. Lévy, Paris, 1887
- Le Frère lai, 1888
- Chez les filles, Victor Havard, 1888
- L'Enfer parisien, Victor-Havard, Paris, 1888
- Notre patron Alphonse Daudet, 1888
- Les jeux du cirque et la vie foraine, illustrations de Jules Garnier, Plon, 1889
- Le Chemin du crime, Paris, Harvard, 1889, 265 p.
- Les Larrons, G. Charpentier, Paris, 1890
- Les Fleurs à Paris, Quantin, Paris, 1890
- Au Sahara, Mar pon & Flammarion, 1891
- Portraits de cire, Paris, Lecene, oudin, 3e éd.,1891, 446 p. Souvenirs de Maupassant
- Tout pour l'honneur, C. Lévy, Paris, 1892
- Marins et soldats, C. Lévy, Paris, 1892
- Les mondains, Calmann Levy, 1893, 331 p.
- Gladys Paris, Calmann Lévy, 5e édition, 1894, 325 p.
- Je deviens colon. mœurs algériennes, 3e édition, Calmann-levy, 1895
- Notes sur la Norvège, C. Lévy, Paris, 1895
- "Le Festéjadou" recits du sud - calmann levy editeur 1895
- Ô mon passé...Mémoires d’un enfant, Calman Lévy, 1896
- Le maître de l’heure, Calmann-levy, 1897
- Les Amants byzantins, Paris, Calmann-Lévy, 1897
- Nos filles. Qu’en ferons-nous?, Calmann Lévy, 1898.* Nos fils - Que feront-ils? 1899
- Gens de poudre, 1899
- L’attentat Sloughine, mœurs terroristes années 1890 à 1920, Paris, Ernest Flammarion, 1900
- Le Bilan du divorce, 1900
- Ménélik et nous, Paris, Librairie Nilsson, 1901,446 pp.
- Voyage au Ouallaga. Itinéraire d’Addis-Ababa au Nil bleu (avec une carte hors texte), dans le bulletin de la société de géographie, Masson, 1901
- Prisonniers marocains, l’épopée d’Afrique, Calmann-levy, 1903
- Chasses et gens d’Abyssinie, Calmann-levy, 1903
- Le Wyoming, 1904
- Ô mon passé, illustrations De J. Jamet. Paris, Ideal-Bibliothèque Pierre Lafitte Et Cie, 1910, 113 p.
- Au champ d’honneur, Plon, 1916
- Niger et Tchad, Mission Hugues Le Roux, Ministère des Affaires étrangères, 1918
- Te souviens-tu ?, Plon 1920

=== Theatre ===
- Crime et châtiment, drame, adaptation de l'oeuvre de F. Dostoievski, avec Paul Ginistry, Théâtre de l'Odeon, Paris, 1888
- L'Instantané, vaudeville avec Gaston Arman de Caillavet, Théâtre des Bouffes-Parisiens, octobre 1901
