= Government of Somaliland =

Collective executive of Somaliland

- Xukuumada Somaaliland
- Government logo
- Formation: 18 May 1991; 35 years ago
- Founding document: Constitution of Somaliland
- Jurisdiction: Republic of Somaliland
- Website: www.govsomaliland.org

Legislative branch
- Legislature: Parliament
- Meeting place: Parliament Building

Executive branch
- Leader: President
- Headquarters: Presidential Palace
- Main organ: Cabinet

Judicial branch
- Court: Supreme Court
- Seat: Hargeisa

The Government of the Republic of Somaliland (JSL) (Somali: Dowladda Soomaaliland or Xukuumada Soomaaliland, Arabic: حكومة صوماليلاند, romanized: Hukumat Sumaliland) is the central government of Somaliland. The Government of Somaliland consists of legislative, executive, and judicial branches, each of which functions independently from the others. The Government runs under the framework established by the Constitution of Somaliland, adopted in 2001. It is a unitary state. The seat of the government is located in Hargeisa, the capital of Somaliland.

Although Somaliland has its own currency, armed forces, police, passport, visa and history of its independence as the State of Somaliland from the British, no country recognizes it except Israel.

== Establishment ==
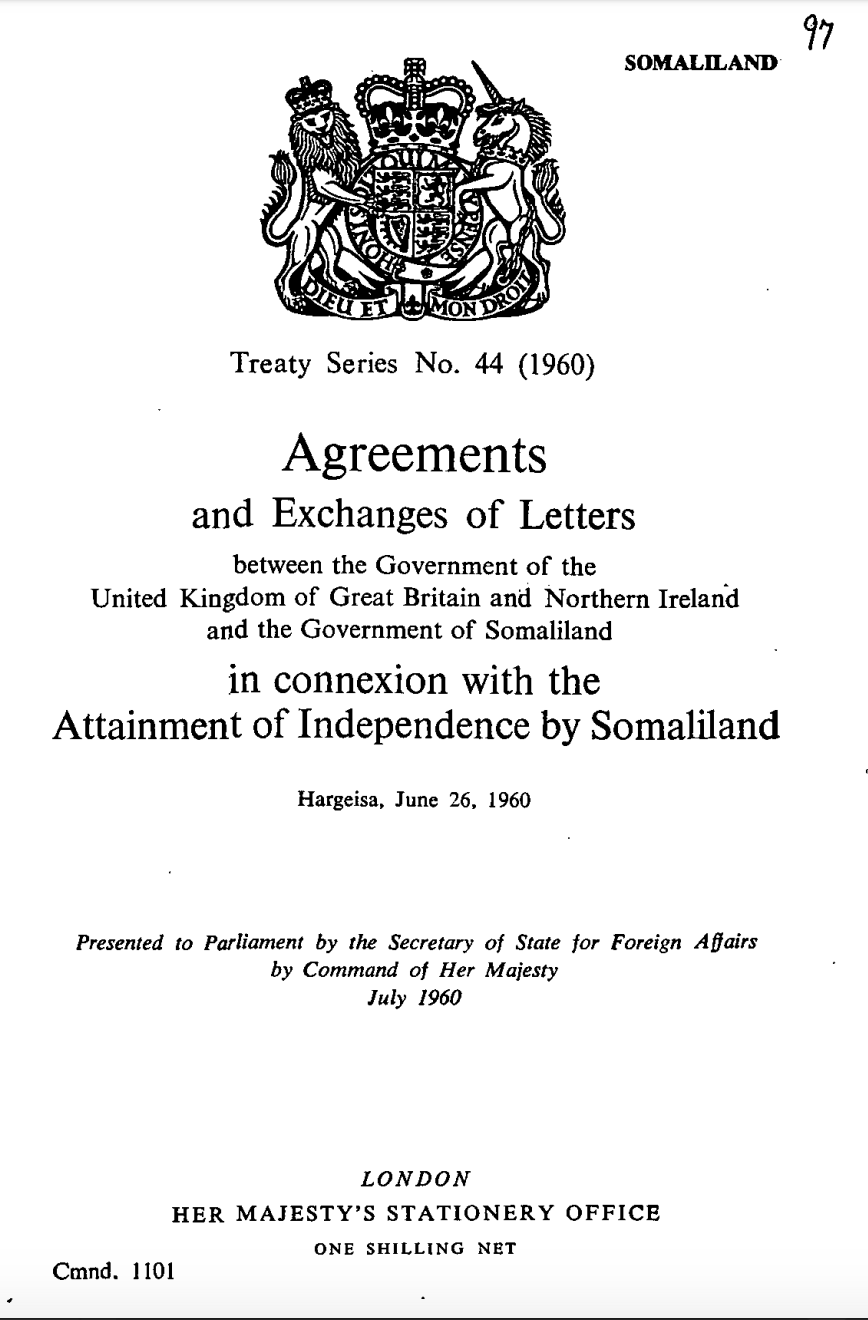
Agreements and Exchanges of Letters between the Government of the United Kingdom of Great Britain and Northern Ireland and the Government of Somaliland in connexion with the Attainment of Independence by Somaliland

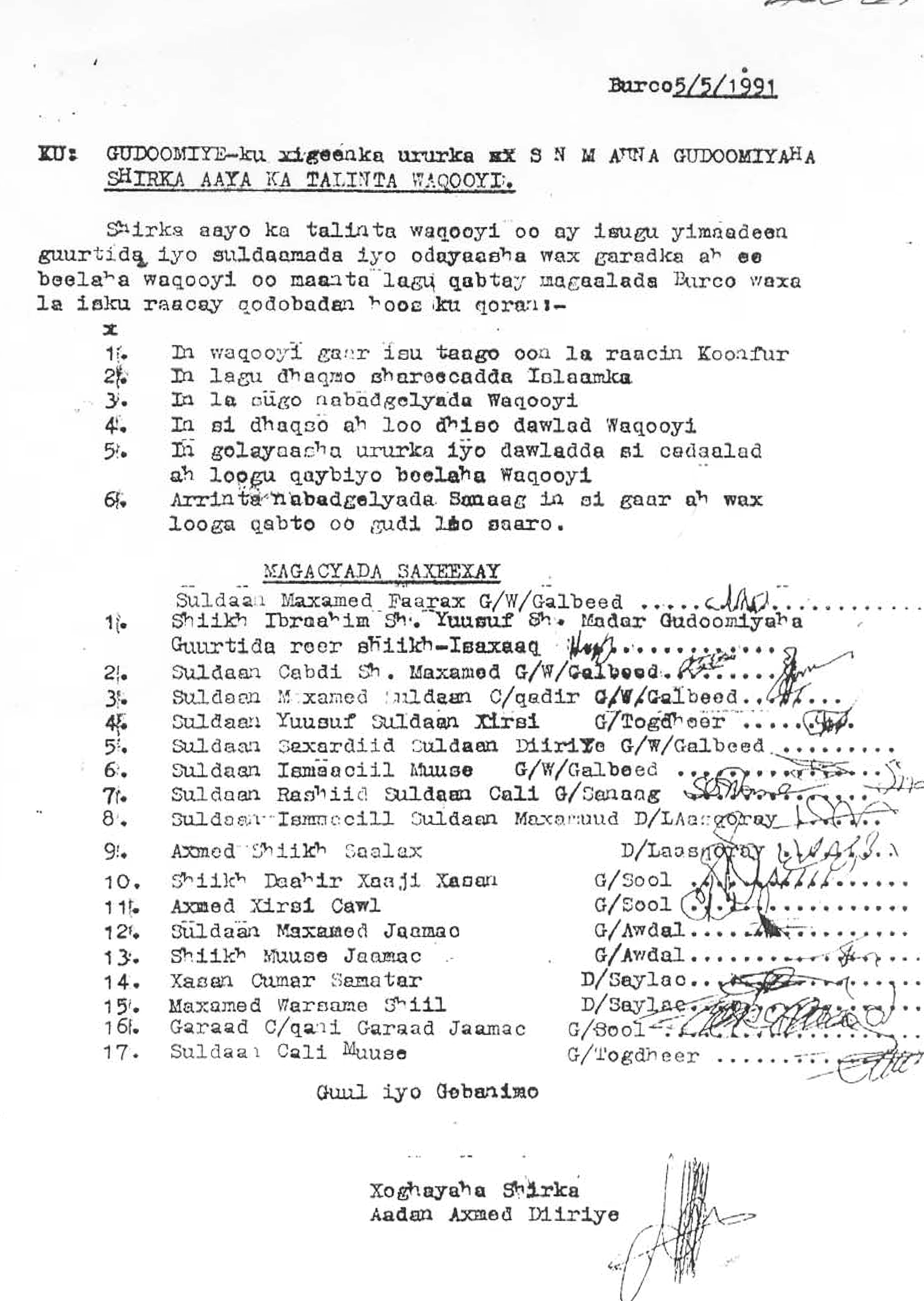
Signatures on the 1991 Somaliland Independence resolution

The first government was formed in 1960, and it was a government that signed with United Kingdom of Great Britain and Northern Ireland the formal independence of Somaliland from United Kingdom of Great Britain and Northern Ireland on May 26, 1960, headed by Muhammad Haji Ibrahim Egal, the first Prime Minister of Somaliland and the second president of Somaliland. However the second government was established after the civil wars in Somalia escalated. The Grand Conference of the Northern People was held in Burao and was composed of the leaders of the Somali National Movement and representatives of all clans inhabiting north-western Somalia and decided that for the secession of Somalia to restore the sovereign state in Somaliland on 18 May 1991.

== Executive branch ==
Main office-holders
Office	Name	Party	Since
President	Abdirahman Mohamed Abdullahi	Waddani	12 December 2024
Vice-President	Mohamed Aw-Ali Abdi	Waddani	12 December 2024

The executive branch comprises the President as head of state and government, the Vice-President and the Council of Ministers. The president, together with the vice-president, is elected by the people no more than twice for a term of office of five years. He appoints and dismisses the ministers, whereby these decisions must also be approved by parliament.

Although the ministers should primarily be selected on the basis of their qualifications, the previous presidents have each appointed ministers based on their clan membership in order to secure the support of the corresponding clans. The number of ministers has risen from 19 in 1993 to over 23.

=== The Cabinet ===
As of 1 December 2019, the cabinet consists of:

No	Office	Minister	Since
1	Ministry of Agricultural Development	Ahmed Mumin Seed	December 2017
2	Ministry of Commerce, Industries and Tourism	Mohamoud Hassan Saad	December 2019
3	Ministry of Defence	Abdiqani Mohamoud Aateye	March 2019
4	Ministry of Education and Science	Ahmed Mohamed Diriye	December 2019
5	Ministry of Employment and Social Affairs	Mustafe Mohamoud Ali	January 2021
6	Ministry of Energy & Minerals	Jama Mohamoud Egal	December 2017
7	Ministry of Endowment and Religious Affairs	Khalil Abdillahi Ahmed	July 2010
8	Ministry of Environment and Rural Development	Shukri Haji Ismail	June 2013
9	Ministry of Finance Development	Dr. Saad Ali Shire	November 2018
10	Ministry of Foreign Affairs	Essa Kayd	September 2021
11	Ministry of Health Development	Omar Ali Abdillahi	April 2019
12	Ministry of Information, Guidance and Culture	Saleban Yusuf Ali	December 2019
13	Ministry of Interior	Mohamed Kahin Ahmed	December 2017
14	Ministry of Investment Promotion	Mohamed Ahmed Mohamoud	December 2017
15	Ministry of Justice	Mustafe Mohamoud Ali	December 2019
16	Ministry of Livestock & Fisheries Development	Said Sulub Mohamed	December 2019
17	Ministry of Parliamentary Relations and Constitutional Affairs	Mohamed Adan Elmi	December 2017
18	Ministry of Planning and National Development	Hassan Mohammed Ali	December 2019
19	Ministry of Public Works, Land and Housing	Abdirashid Haji Duale	December 2017
20	Ministry of Telecommunications and Technology	Abdiweli Sheikh Abdillahi	December 2019
21	Ministry of Transportation and Roads Development	Abdillahi Abokor Osman	December 2017
22	Ministry of Water Development	Mohamed Muse Diriye	December 2019
23	Ministry of Youth and Sports	Abdirashid Haji Duale	September 2021

== Legislative branch ==
Seal of the Somaliland House of Representatives

Seal of the House of Elders.

The parliament (Somali: Baarlamaanka) consists of two chambers, House of Elders (Somali: Golaha Guurtida or Guurti) and the House of Representatives (Somali: Golaha Wakiilada), both of which have 82 members.

The members of the House of Representatives are elected by the people for a five-year term, as was the case for the first time in the 2005 elections and the last was 2021. The seats are distributed by administrative region as shown in the table below:

Electoral region	Seats
01 Awdal	13
02 Sahil	10
03 Marodi Jeh	20
04 Togdheer	15
05 Sanaag	12
06 Sool	12

In the institution of the house of elders, the traditional councils of elders of the clans are integrated into a modern state system. This council primarily has an advisory function and special responsibility for laws relating to security, religion and culture. Its members are determined by the clans and have a six-year term of office. The question of whether they should also be determined by popular elections in the future is the subject of political debate.

To run for a seat in the House of Representatives, a citizen must be Muslim, at least 35 years old, have at least attended secondary school, have no criminal record within the last five years, and be able to perform the duties of the office. State employees can only start if they withdraw from their employment with the state. The same requirements apply to the House of Elders, with the exception that the minimum age is 45 years and a good knowledge of religion and traditions is required.

== Judicial branch ==
The judicial system includes the district and regional courts as the courts of first instance, the appellate courts in each region and, as the highest instance, the Supreme Court and Constitutional Court in Hargeisa. In August 2006, Somaliland had a total of 33 courts with 87 judges. .

The sources of law are Somali customary law (heer or Xeer), Islamic law (Shari’a) and modern (British) law. In many cases, these contradict each other considerably. The corporal punishment for certain crimes provided for in the Shari'a is not applied, since such cases are dealt with under customary law with compensation payments and the constitution forbids corporal punishment.

== Regional and local administration ==
The Regions and Districts Act of 2002 formalized the administrative structure with six regions and 23 districts in which local elections for the district councils would take place. The districts were classified according to area, population and density, economy and production in grades from A to D, with A being the highest and D being the lowest. A districts have district councils with 21 members, B districts 17, C districts 13 and D districts nine, the capital Hargeysa has a parish council with 25 members. The district councils are directly elected by the district electorate – for the first time in the local elections in 2002 – and in turn determine the mayor. The 23 districts with elected district councils have police and judicial structures in place, and tax revenue is passed on to central government, which in turn provides the districts with funds to pay civil servants, including teachers and health workers. Most districts are largely financially dependent on the central government for lack of their own resources.

The regions are governed by regional councils made up of the elected mayors. These are headed by governors who are appointed by the central government.

Somaliland is officially divided into Six regions (plural gobollada; singular gobol), which in turn are subdivided into districts. The regions are as follows:

== Suffrage ==
All citizens over the age of 16 have the right to vote, with the exception of prison inmates. For local and parliamentary elections, proportional representation applies; the election of both the president and vice-president is based on majority voting.

== See also ==
- Politics of Somaliland
