= Ministry of Transportation (Somaliland) =

Government ministry of Somaliland

Republic of Somaliland Ministry of Transportation and Roads Development
- Wasaarada Gaadiidka iyo Horumarinta Jidadka; MoTRD
- Coat of arms of Somaliland

Ministry overview
- Formed: 2017; 9 years ago
- Jurisdiction: Somaliland
- Headquarters: Maroodi Jeex, Hargeisa (Somaliland)
- Minister responsible: Osman Ibrahim Noor (Afgaab), Minister
- Website: https://motrd.govsomaliland.org/

Footnotes
- Ministry of Transportation on Facebook

The Ministry of Transportation and Roads Development of the Republic of Somaliland (MoTRD) (Somali: Wasaarada Gaadiidka iyo Horumarinta Jidadka Somaliland) (Arabic: وزارة النقل وتطوير الطرق) is a government ministry of Somaliland responsible for overseeing the country's land transportation network. Its primary mandates include regulating public transit, ensuring road safety, and developing national road infrastructure. While the Ministry of Transportation and Roads Development strictly oversees land infrastructure, maritime transport falls under the jurisdiction of the Somaliland Ports Authority and air transport is governed by the Ministry of Aviation and Air Transport (Somali: Wasiirka Duulista iyo Hawada).

== Ministry Name ==
When Somaliland re-declared its independence in 1991, the Ministry of Transport was not an independent body; instead, it was part of the Ministry of Marine and Transport. In 1993, it was merged into the Ministry of Public Works, forming the Ministry of Public Works and Transport. In July 2003, the transport portfolio was incorporated into the Ministry of Public Works and Housing, and the term "transport" was temporarily removed from the ministry's official name. The name was revived in 2010 when it once again became the Ministry of Public Works and Transport. Finally, in December 2017, it was restructured into its current form as the Ministry of Transport and Roads Development.

== History ==
=== Berbera Corridor ===
The Ministry of Transport and Roads Development (MoTRD) plays a central role in overseeing and regulating the Berbera Corridor, Somaliland's most strategic infrastructure project. The corridor is a major 250-kilometer highway connecting the Port of Berbera to the Ethiopian border town of Tog Wajaale, intended to transform the country into a regional trade and logistics hub. Acting as the primary governmental supervisory body, the Ministry coordinates construction and modernization efforts in partnership with international stakeholders, including the Abu Dhabi Fund for Development, the United Kingdom, and DP World.

=== Legal and technological reforms ===
To modernize the national transit infrastructure and enhance road safety, the Ministry of Transport and Roads Development has implemented significant legal and technological reforms. The ministry has focused on establishing a robust legal framework by enforcing comprehensive traffic regulations to standardize road usage and vehicle safety. In early 2020, the ministry introduced stringent new directives for the issuance of driver's licenses to improve driver competency and accountability. Furthermore, to regulate the public transit sector, the ministry launched a technological modernization program that mandates the installation of GPRS tracking devices in public transport vehicles. This initiative is aimed at monitoring vehicle movements, ensuring passenger safety, and improving overall fleet management across the country.

=== Abruptly dismissed Minister ===
In an unusual political development for the ministry, President Muse Bihi Abdi abruptly dismissed Minister Saleban Awad Ali Bukhaari in March 2024. Bukhaari, who had been appointed to head the transport and roads development portfolio just months earlier in November 2023, was removed from his position during a cabinet reshuffle before he had even received the mandatory formal approval from the Somaliland House of Representatives. This rapid dismissal of a cabinet member prior to parliamentary confirmation marked a rare and notable occurrence in the government's procedural history.

== Ministers ==
Minister	Ministry name	Took office	Left office
Omar Isse Awale (Cumar Ciise Cawaale)	Ministry of Marine and Transport (Wasaaradda Badda iyo Gaadiidka)	June 1991	May 1993
Abdi Mohamed Gaagale (Cabdi Maxamed Gaagaale)	Ministry of Public Works and Transport (Wasaaradda Hawlaha Guud iyo Gaadiidka)	May 1993	1997
Said Sulub Mohamed (Siciid Sulub Maxamed)	Ministry of Public Works and Housing (Wasaaradda Hawlaha Guud iyo Guriyeynta)	July 2003	July 2010
Hussein Ahmed Aideed (Xuseen Axmed Caydiid)	Ministry of Public Works and Transport (Wasaaradda Hawlaha Guud iyo Gaadiidka)	July 2010	June 2011
Ismaaciil Muumin Aar (Ismaaciil Muumin Aar)	Ministry of Public Works and Transport (Wasaaradda Hawlaha Guud iyo Gaadiidka)	June 2011	March 2012
Ahmed Habsade (Axmed Cabdi Xaabsade)	Ministry of Public Works and Transport (Wasaaradda Hawlaha Guud iyo Gaadiidka)	March 2012	June 2013
Abdirisak Khalif (Cabdirisaaq Khaliif Axmed)	Ministry of Public Works, Housing and Transport (Wasaaradda Hawlaha Guud, Guriyeynta iyo Gaadiidka)	June 2013	October 2015
Ali Hassan Mohamed "Cali Mareexaan" (Cali Xasan Maxamed)	Ministry of Public Works, Housing and Transport (Wasaaradda Hawlaha Guud, Guriyeynta iyo Gaadiidka)	October 2015	
Abdillahi Abokor Osman (Cabdillaahi Abokor Cismaan)	Ministry of Transport and Roads Development (Wasaaradda Gaadiidka iyo Horumarinta Jidadka)	December 2017	
Abdirisaaq Ibraahim Mahamed (Ataash) (Cabdirisaaq Ibraahim Maxamed Ataash)	Ministry of Transport and Roads Development (Wasaaradda Gaadiidka iyo Horumarinta Jidadka)	September 2021	April 2022
Cabdirisaaq Ibraahim Maxamed Faarax (Cabdirisaaq Ibraahim Maxamed Faarax)	Ministry of Transport and Roads Development (Wasaaradda Gaadiidka iyo Horumarinta Jidadka)	April 2022	November 2023
Saleebaan Cawad Cali Bukhaari (Saleebaan Cawad Cali Bukhaari)	Ministry of Transport and Roads Development (Wasaaradda Gaadiidka iyo Horumarinta Jidadka)	November 2023	March 2024
Rabi Abdi Mohamed (Raabbi Cabdi Maxamed)	Ministry of Transport and Roads Development (Wasaaradda Gaadiidka iyo Horumarinta Jidadka)	March 2024	December 2024
Osman Ibrahim Noor (Afgaab) (Cismaan Ibraahim Nuur)	Ministry of Transport and Road Development (Wasaaradda Gaadiidka iyo Horumarinta Jidadka)	December 2024	

== See also ==
- Politics of Somaliland
- Cabinet of Somaliland
