= Ministry of Public Works and Housing (Somaliland) =

Government ministry of Somaliland

Republic of Somaliland Ministry of Public Works and Housing
- Wasaaradda Hawlaha Guud iyo Guryeynta; MoPWH
- Coat of arms of Somaliland

Ministry overview
- Formed: 1994; 32 years ago
- Jurisdiction: Somaliland
- Headquarters: Maroodi Jeex, Hargeisa (Somaliland)
- Minister responsible: Abdirashid Haji Duale, Minister
- Website: https://mopwlh.govsomaliland.org/

Footnotes
- Ministry of Public Works and Housing on Facebook

The Ministry of Public Works and Housing of the Republic of Somaliland (MoPWH) (Somali: Wasaaradda Hawlaha Guud iyo Guryeynta Jamhuuriyadda Somaliland) (Arabic: وزارة الاشغال العامة والاسكان) is a ministry of the Somaliland cabinet responsible for public works, land affairs and housing projects.

== Ministers of Public works ==
Image	Minister	Ministry	Term Start	Term End
	Mahdi Abdi Degoyare (Maxdi Cabdi Digo-yare)	Ministry of Public Works (Wasaaradda Hawlaha Guud)	1991	1992
	Abdi Maqsud Gahl (Cabdi Maqsud Gaale)	Ministry of Public Works and Transport (Wasaaradda Hawlaha Guud iyo Gaadiidka)	1993	1997
	Said Sulub Mohamed (Siciid Sulub Maxamed)	Ministry of Public Works (Wasaaradda Hawlaha Guud)	July 2003	July 2010
	Hussein Ahmed Aideed (Xuseen Axmed Caydiid)	Ministry of Public Works and Transport (Wasaaradda Hawlaha Guud iyo Gaadiidka)	July 2010	June 2011
	Ismail Mumin Are (Ismaaciil Muumin Aare)	Ministry of Public Works and Transport (Wasaaradda Hawlaha Guud iyo Gaadiidka)	June 2011	March 2012
	Ahmed Abdi Habsade (Axmed Cabdi Xabsade)	Ministry of Public Works, Housing and Transport (Wasaaradda Hawlaha Guud, Guriyeynta iyo Gaadiidka)	March 2012	June 2013
	Abdirizak Khalif Ahmed (Cabdirisaaq Khaliif Axmed)	Ministry of Public Works, Housing and Transport (Wasaaradda Hawlaha Guud, Guriyeynta iyo Gaadiidka)	June 2013	October 2015
	Ali Hassan Mohamed (Cali Xasan Maxamed / Cali Mareexaan)	Ministry of Public Works, Housing and Transport (Wasaaradda Hawlaha Guud, Guriyeynta iyo Gaadiidka)	October 2015	
	Abdirashid Haji Duale (Cabdirashiid Xaaji Ducaale)	Ministry of Public Works, Land and Housing (Wasaaradda Hawlaha Guud, Dhulka iyo Guryeynta)	December 2017	September 2021
	Abdillahi Abokor Osman Aw Yusuf (Cabdillaahi Abokor Cismaan Aw Yuusuf)	Ministry of Public Works, Land and Housing (Wasaaradda Hawlaha Guud, Dhulka iyo Guryeynta)	September 2021	January 2023
	Mustafe Mohamoud Ali Bile (Mustafe Maxamuud Cali Bile)	Ministry of Public Works and Housing (Wasaaradda Hawlaha Guud iyo Guryeynta)	January 2023	December 2024
	Hussein Ahmed Aideed (Xuseen Axmed Caydiid)	Ministry of Public Works, Land and Housing (Wasaaradda Hawlaha Guud, Dhulka iyo Guryeynta)	December 2024	Present

== See also ==
- Ministry of Interior (Somaliland)
- Ministry of Finance (Somaliland)
- Somaliland National Armed Forces
- Politics of Somaliland
