= Ministry of Investment (Somaliland) =

Government ministry of Somaliland

Republic of Somaliland Ministry of Investment and Industrial Development
- Wasaaradda Horumarinta Maalgashiga iyo Warshadaha (MOIID)
- Coat of arms of Somaliland

Ministry overview
- Formed: December 14, 2017
- Jurisdiction: Somaliland
- Headquarters: Hargeisa, Maroodi Jeh (Somaliland)

The Ministry of Investment and Industrial Development (MOIID) (Somali: Wasaaradda Horumarinta Maalgashiga iyo Warshadaha) of Somaliland established on 14 December 2017 by President Muse Bihi Abdi. It was spun off from a division of the Ministry of Trade.

== History ==
=== Clarification of Responsible Departments ===
In June 2013, Somaliland President Silanyo renamed the ministry previously known as the “Ministry of Trade, Industry and Tourism (Wasaarada Ganacsiga, Warshadaha iyoo Dalxiiska)” to the “Ministry of Commerce and Investment (Wasaaradda Ganacsiga iyoo Maalgashiga)”. This clarified which government agency has jurisdiction over “investment.”

=== Ministry of Investment Promotion ===
Somaliland's Ministry of Investment Promotion (MoIP) (Somali: Wasaaradda Horumarinta Maalgashiga Somaliland) (Arabic:وزارة تطوير الاستثمار) was created for the first time on 14 December 2017 to coordinate fragmented investment projects through a single-window approach. Its mission was to proactively seek, attract, facilitate, and promote productive foreign and domestic investment in line with Somaliland's investment and development plans and the national development plan. The Ministry of Trade has been renamed the Ministry of Trade and Tourism.

The Ministry tasked and primarily responsible to facilitate both local and foreign investment schemes and encourage the investment opportunities through, promotion, media coverage and employing research and development strategy

=== Ministry of Investment and Industrial Development ===
On 5 September 2021, President Muse Bihi Abdi carried out a cabinet reshuffle and appointed Abdillahi Abdirahman Aare Osman as Minister of Investment and Industrial Development.

MOIID is responsible for formulating and monitoring investment and development strategies, policies, and programs; developing specialized economic zones; coordinating regional integration; and promoting private-sector development by improving the investment climate for domestic and foreign investors. The ministry also drafts, negotiates, and approves bilateral Investment Promotion and Protection Agreements, issues investment licenses through a one-stop shop system, provides investors with information and promotional materials, and engages with international organizations and other governments to support investment facilitation and broader socio-economic development.

== Ministers ==
| Image | Minister | Somali Name | Term start | Term end |
|---|---|---|---|---|
| | Mohamed Ahmed Mohamoud “Awad” | Maxamed Axmed Maxamuud Cawad | December 2017 | September 2021 |
| | Abdillahi Abdirahman “Aare” Osman | Cabdillaahi Cabdiraxmaan Aare Cismaan | September 2021 | November 2022 |
| | Amina Elmi Farid | Aamina Cilmi Fariid Badeed | November 2022 | May 2023 |
| | Abdi Osman Dhaga-Weyne Abdulle | Cabdi Cismaan Cabdulle Dhaga-weyne | May 2023 | November 2023 |
| | Mohamed Adan Elmi | Maxamed Xaaji Aadan Cilmi Maxamuud | May 2023 | November 2023 |
| | Abdirisaq Ibrahim Mahamed | Cabdirisaaq Ibraahim Maxamed | November 2023 | December 2024 |
| | Saeed (Said) Mohamed Bourale (Araale) | Siciid Maxamed Buraale | December 2024 | Incumbent |
