= Ministry of Endowment and Religious Affairs (Somaliland) =

Government ministry of Somaliland

Republic of Somaliland Ministry of Endowment and Religious Affairs
- Wasaaradda Diinta iyo Awqaafta (MoERA)
- Coat of arms of Somaliland

Agency overview
- Formed: 1995
- Jurisdiction: Somaliland
- Headquarters: 10, Abu Bakar Al Siddiq Road, Lixle, Ibrahim Koodbuur, Hargeisa,90504, Hargeisa (Somaliland); 9°33′44″N 44°02′46″E
- Agency executive: Sheikh Abdillahi Dahir Jama (Bashe), Minister

Footnotes
- Ministry of Endowment and Religious Affairs on Facebook

The Ministry of Endowment and Religious Affairs of Somaliland (Somali: Wasaaradda Diinta iyo Awqaafta Somaliland) (Arabic: وزارة الأوقاف والشؤون الدينية) is a Somaliland government is the Somaliland branch of government charged with religious affairs and endowments.

== Ministers ==
Image	Minister	Term start	Term End
	Sheikh Abdirahman Dahir	1993	1997
	Sheekh Mahamed Abdillahi Ayatulahi	13 March 1997	1999
	Sheikh Mahamoud Sufi Mohamed	July 2003	July 2010
	Sheikh Khalil Abdillahi Ahmed	27 July 2010	2 September 2021
	Sheikh Abdirisaq Husein Ali (Al-baani)	2 September 2021	
	Mohamed Haji Adan Elmi	November 2023	December 2024
	Sheikh Abdillahi Dahir Jama (Bashe)	December 2024	incumbent

== See also ==
- Ministry of Justice (Somaliland)
- Ministry of Finance (Somaliland)
- Ministry of Health (Somaliland)
