= Abdirizak =

Abdirizak or Abdirisak is a given name. Notable people with the name include:

- Abdirizak Mohamud Abubakar (1937–1997), Somali military leader
- Abdirizak Ibrahim Mohamed Attash (born 1969), Post and Telecommunications Minister of the autonomous region of Somaliland
- Abdirizak Bihi, Somali-American social activist
- Abdirizak Haji Hussein (8206–2014), Somali diplomat and politician
- Abdirizak Jurile, Somali British politician, diplomat and professor
- Abdirisak Khalif, Somaliland politician and speaker of Somaliland's Lower House of Parliament
- Abdirisak Omar Mohamed, Somali politician, academic, and policymaker
- Mohamed Abdirizak Mohamud, Somali politician, Minister of Foreign Affairs for Somalia
- Abdirizak Ahmed Said, Speaker of Puntland Parliament
- Abdirizak Waberi (born 1966), Somali–Swedish Moderate Party politician
