= Ministry of Environment (Somaliland) =

Government ministry of Somaliland

Republic of Somaliland Ministry of Environment and Climate Change
- Wasaaradda Deegaanka iyo Isbedelka Cimilada (MoECC)
- Coat of arms of Somaliland

Agency overview
- Formed: 2004 as Environment and Rural Development
- Jurisdiction: Somaliland
- Headquarters: Hargeisa, Maroodi Jeh (Somaliland)
- Agency executive: Minister; Director General
- Website: moecc.govsomaliland.org

Footnotes
- Ministry of Environment on Facebook

The Ministry of Environment and Climate Change (MoECC, Somali: Wasaaradda Deegaanka iyo Isbedelka Cimilada) is a Somaliland government branch charged with environmental protection.

== Ministry name ==
=== Ministry of "Rural Development" to "Environment and Rural Development" ===
In July 2003, Fuad Adan Adde was appointed Minister of Rural Development by President Dahir Riyale Kahin, but by January 2004 at the latest, he was referred to as Minister of Environment and Rural Development.

=== Ministry of Livestock, Environment and Rural Development ===
In July 2010, Somaliland President Ahmed Mohamed Mohamoud "Silanyo" appointed Ahmed Hashi Oday as Minister of the Ministry of Livestock, Environment and Rural Development (Somali: Wasaaradda Xannaanada Xoolaha Deegaanka iyo Horumarinta reer Miyiga). The Ministry of Livestock was a separate department until 2010, but was unified at that time.

In January 2011, Somaliland President Silanyo appointed Abdi Aw Daahir Ali as Minister of the Ministry of Livestock, Environment and Rural Development.

=== Ministry of Environment and Rural Development ===
In June 2013, Somaliland President Ahmed Mohamed Mohamoud "Silanyo" appointed Shukri Haji Ismail as Minister of Environment and Rural Development (Somali: Wasaaradda Deegaanka iyo Horumarinta Reer Miyiga), a position created by separating it from the Ministry of Livestock.

In November 2021, Somaliland President Muse Bihi Abdi announced the appointment of Ahmed Adan Jama Ahmed as Minister of the Ministry of Environment and Rural Development, although contemporary reporting provides limited confirmation that he actually assumed office.

=== Ministry of Environment and Climate Change ===
In February 2022, Shugri Haji Ismail Bandare was referenced as Minister of the Ministry of Environment and Climate Change (Somali: Wasaaradda Deegaanka iyo Isbedelka Cimilada), indicating the addition of climate change to the ministry’s portfolio. The renaming of the Ministry of Environment and Rural Development (MoERD) to the Ministry of Environment and Climate Change (MoECC) was carried out as part of a wider restructuring of government ministries in Somaliland, alongside the separation of Rural Development into a new ministry.

In January 2025, Abdilaahi Osman Jama was approved as the Minister.

== Ministers ==
Image	Minister	Somali Name	Term start	Term end
	Fuad Adan Adde	Fu'aad Aadan Cadde	July 2003 (as Minister of Rural Development)	4 April 2008
	Mohamed Hagar Dirir	Maxamed Hagar Dirir	15 April 2008	
	Ahmed Hashi Oday	Axmed Xaashi Oday	28 July 2010	15 January 2011
	Abdi Aw Daahir Ali	Cabdi Aw Daahir Cali	15 January 2011	11 June 2011
	Mahmoud Said Mahmoud (Gacmay)	Maxamuud Siciid Maxamuud (Gacmay)	11 June 2011	25 June 2013
	Shukri Haji Ismail Bandare	Shugri Xaaji Ismaaciil Baandare	25 June 2013	14 December 2024
	Abdilahi Jama Osman Geeljire	Cabdilaahi Jaamac Cismaan (Geeljire)	14 December 2024	Incumbent

== Departments ==
As of 2021, the Ministry of Ministry of Environment and Rural Development consists of eight departments:

- Department of Rural Development
- ICT Department
- Human Resource Department
- Environmental Safeguard Department
- Finance and Administration Department
- Planning Department
- Rangeland and Forestry Department
- Wildlife and Parks Department

== See also ==
- Ministry of Justice (Somaliland)
- Ministry of Finance (Somaliland)
- Ministry of Health (Somaliland)
