= Amina Elmi Farid =

Somali politician

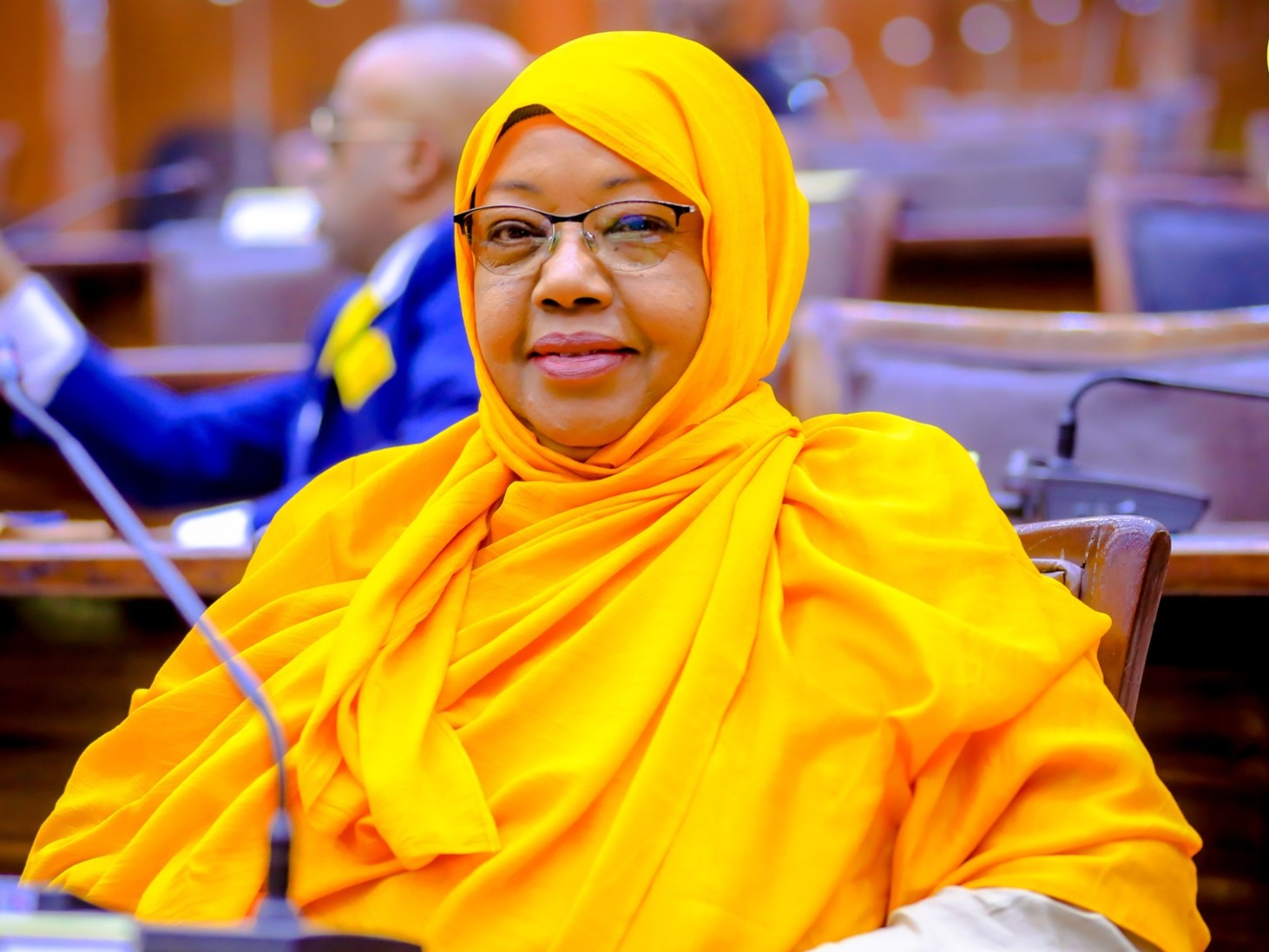

Ministry of Investment and Industrial Development (MoIID)
- In office November 2022 – May 2023
- President: Muse Bihi Abdi
- Preceded by: Abdillahi Abdirahman “Aare” Osman
- Succeeded by: Said Mohamed Bourale (Arale)

Amina Elmi Farid Baded (Somali: Aamina Cilmi Fariid Baaded) is a Somaliland politician who has served as a member of the House of Representatives since May 2023, becoming the only woman in the chamber of that parliamentary term. She previously served as Minister of Investment in the government of President Muse Bihi Abdi from November 2022 until her resignation in 2023 to take up her parliamentary seat.

== Biography ==
Amina was born in Burao, received her primary education there, and later worked in Berbera for Somali Airlines.

Amina worked internationally in places such as New Zealand, the United Kingdom, and the United Arab Emirates before returning to Somaliland.

On 31 May 2021, the Somaliland parliamentary election for the House of Representatives was held; 18 women ran, but none won any of the 82 seats, leaving the chamber entirely male, and Amina Elmi Farid—who ran to represent the Awdal region—was among those defeated. During the election period, traditional elders in Awdal who backed Amina were reported to have been arrested.

=== Minister of investment and industrial development ===
In November 2022, President Muse Bihi Abdi dismissed the Minister of investment and industrial development, Abdullahi Abdirahman Aare, and appointed Amina Elmi Farid; no reason for the dismissal was disclosed. This cabinet reshuffle took place a few days after the Somaliland opposition declared it would not recognize President Muse Bihi Abdi as the region's legitimate leader after his term ended on 13 November. As a result, the number of female cabinet ministers has increased to four.

In December 2022, the new Minister of Investment and Industry, Amina, led a high-powered government delegation on a visit to the Awdal and Salal regions.

In March 2023, Amina briefed a delegation from Taiwan on Somaliland's investment opportunities and industrial sectors.

=== MP of House of Representatives ===
In May 2023, after MP Nuur Osman Guled (UCID), who had represented the Awdal region, died, Amina Elmi Farid was elevated to the Somaliland House of Representatives to fill his vacant seat, in line with the constitutional rule that such vacancies are filled by the party's top candidates on its waiting list. She decided to step down from her ministerial post in order to take up a seat in the Somaliland House of Representatives. No women were elected in Somaliland's 2021 parliamentary elections, and Amina Elmi Farid consequently became the first female member of the House of Representatives of that term.

In February 2024, Amina visited Nairobi, Kenya, and held discussions with Kenyan stakeholders and institutions on issues including the eradication of female genital mutilation/cutting (FGM/C).

== See also ==
- Politics of Somaliland
- List of Somaliland politicians

Political offices
Preceded by Abdillahi Abdirahman “Aare” Osman	Minister of Investment and Industrial Development (MoIID); 2022–2023	Succeeded by Said Mohamed Bourale (Arale)
