= Salal (disambiguation) =

Salal is a shrub, native to western North America and planted widely in Britain, whose scientific name is Gaultheria shallon.

Salal may also refer to:

- Salal, Chad, a city in Bahr el Gazel Region
- Salal, Somalia, a region in Somaliland
