= Ministry of Parliamentary Relations and Constitutional Affairs =

Government ministry of Somaliland

Republic of Somaliland Ministry of Parliamentary Relations and Constitutional Affairs
- Wasaaradda Xidhiidhka Goleyaasha iyo Arrimaha Dastuurka
- Coat of arms of Somaliland

Ministry overview
- Formed: November 8, 1995; 30 years ago
- Jurisdiction: Somaliland
- Headquarters: Hargeisa, Maroodi Jeh (Somaliland)
- Minister responsible: Minister
- Website: https://mopca.govsomaliland.org/

The Ministry of Parliamentary Relations and Constitutional Affairs (MoPRCA) (Somali: Wasaaradda Xidhiidhka Goleyaasha iyo Arrimaha Dastuurka) (Arabic: وزارة العلاقات البرلمانية والشؤون الدستورية) is a member of the Somaliland cabinet, responsible for handling affairs relating to the Parliament of Somaliland and Constitution of Somaliland, it also works as a link between the two chambers, (House of Representatives, the lower house) and the (House of Elders, the upper house).

== History ==
The ministry was established on 8 November 1995 by Presidential Decree No. 59/95, originally named the "Relations of the Executive Branch and the Parliament of Somaliland". In 2010, during the administration of the fourth president, the ministry lost its autonomous status and was placed under the Ministry of Presidency. It later regained ministerial status as the "Ministry of Parliamentary Relations, Research and Technology". On 14 December 2017, President Muse Bihi Abdi rearranged the ministry's role under Presidential Act No. 01/2018, giving it its current name.

== Ministers ==
Image	Minister	Ministry Name	Term start	Term end
	Abdi Hassan Buni; Cabdi Xasan Buuni	Ministry of Parliamentary Relations; Wasaaradda Xidhiidhka Goleyaasha	July 2003	June 2009
	Hussein Aynan Farah; Xuseen Caynaan Faarax	Ministry of Parliamentary Relations; Wasaaradda Xidhiidhka Golayaasha	July 2009	July 2010
	(Vacant)	Under the Ministry of Presidency; Wasaaradda Madaxtooyada	July 2010	
	Aden Ahmed Warsame; Aaden Axmed Warsame	Ministry of Parliamentary Relations, Research and Technology; Wasaaradda Xidhiidhka Goleyaasha, Cilmi-baadhista iyo Tiknoolajiyadda	June 2013	June 2014
	Ali Hamud Jibril; Cali Xaamud Jibriil	Ministry of Parliamentary Relations, Research and Technology; Wasaaradda Xidhiidhka Goleyaasha, Cilmi-baadhista iyo Tiknoolajiyadda	July 2014	July 2017
	Mohamed Adan Elmi; Maxamed Xaaji Aadan Cilmi Maxamuud	Ministry of Parliamentary Relations and Constitutional Affairs; Wasaaradda Xidhidhka Golayaasha iyo Arrimaha Dastuurka	December 2017	November 2023
	Abdinasir Muhammed Hassan Buuni; Cabdinaasir Maxamed Xasan Buuni	Ministry of Parliamentary Relations and Constitutional Affairs; Wasaaradda Xidhiidhka Goleyaasha iyo Arrimaha Dastuurka	November 2023	
	Ahmed Aw-dahir Haji Hassan; Axmed Aw-daahir Xaaji Xasan	Ministry of Parliamentary Relations and Constitutional Affairs; Wasaaradda Xidhiidhka Goleyaasha iyo Arrimaha Dastuurka	December 2024	Incumbent

== See also ==
- Constitution of Somaliland
- Parliament of Somaliland
- Politics of Somaliland
