= Ministry of Livestock (Somaliland) =

Government ministry of Somaliland

Republic of Somaliland Ministry of Livestock and Rural development
- Wasaaradda Xannaanada Xoolaha iyo Horumarinta Reer Miyiga (MoLRD)
- Coat of arms of Somaliland

Agency overview
- Formed: 1992
- Jurisdiction: Somaliland
- Headquarters: Woqooyi Galbeed, Hargeisa (Somaliland)
- Agency executive: Said Sulub Mohamed, Minister
- Website: https://molfd.govsomaliland.org/

Footnotes
- Ministry of Livestock on Facebook

The Ministry of Livestock and Rural development of the Republic of Somaliland (MoLRD, Somali: Wasaaradda Xannaanada Xoolaha iyo Horumarinta Reer Miyiga Somaliland) is a Somaliland government ministry which is responsible for the country's livestock sectors.

== History ==
In 2000, the budget of the Somaliland Ministry of Livestock accounted for 0.7% of the national budget, all of which was consumed by operational and personnel costs. Despite the livestock sector's central economic importance, the ministry has historically remained among the lowest-funded government institutions, with budget allocations largely unchanged as of 2019.

In October 2000, Saudi Arabia imposed a ban on livestock imports from the Horn of Africa, including Somaliland, as a precautionary measure against Rift Valley Fever. This embargo severely impacted the national economy, as the Gulf kingdom was the primary destination for the region's animal exports. As a result, Somaliland’s livestock exports suffered a devastating blow in 2001, but they bottomed out and recovered steadily thereafter.

In May 2008, the Somaliland Ministry of Livestock, in collaboration with the Italian NGO Terra Nuova and the Somaliland United Livestock Professional Association (ULPA) veterinarians' association, launched an emergency veterinary campaign. Seven specialized teams were dispatched to provide free medical treatment and nearly $30,000 worth of medicine to livestock in several regions to mitigate the impact of persistent drought.

In November 2009, Minister of Livestock Idris Ibrahim Abdi announced that Saudi Arabia had lifted its nine-year ban on livestock imports, which was originally imposed in 2000 following an outbreak of Rift Valley Fever. This decision revitalized the national economy and restored large-scale trade through the Port of Berbera, leading to a significant surge in livestock prices and market activity.

In December 2016, Saudi Arabia suspended livestock imports from Somalia and Somaliland due to suspected animal illnesses. In response, the Somaliland Minister of Livestock, Abdullahi Mohamed Dahir, asserted that the health status of all livestock exported via the Port of Berbera was officially approved and certified by the Office International des Epizooties (OIE). Although this ban was never lifted, it was temporarily suspended in both Somalia and Somaliland during the Hajj season.

In December 2017, under the administration of President Muse Bihi Abdi, the Ministry of Livestock and the Ministry of Fisheries and Marine Resources were merged to form the Ministry of Livestock and Fishery Development (Somali: Wasaaradda Xannaanda Xoolaha iyo Kalluumaysiga, Arabic: وزارة الثروة الحيوانية والسمكية.) This structural reorganization was intended to streamline government operations and improve administrative efficiency by consolidating related economic sectors under a single ministry.

In June 2018, the Ministry of Livestock officially announced the resumption of livestock exports, marked by the departure of transport vessels from Berbera. The Deputy Minister expressed confidence that ongoing diplomatic negotiations and trade agreements would sustain the export flow, particularly during the high-demand period of Eid al-Adha.

In February 2019, the Somaliland Ministry of Livestock launched a vaccination campaign in the Sheikh District within the Sahil Region. Veterinary teams targeted Ovine rinderpest (PPR) and sheep pox and goat pox in local herds. This initiative aimed to safeguard the health of livestock, which serves as a primary economic pillar for the country's pastoralist population.

In July 2019, Saudi Arabia rejected a shipment of 20,000 sheep and goats from Berbera because they lacked health certification from the Somali Federal Government in Mogadishu. The Somaliland Ministry of Livestock protested the move, opposing a new Saudi directive that required export approvals to be issued by Mogadishu authorities rather than Somaliland.

In April 2020, Saudi Arabia temporarily lifted its ban on livestock imports from Somalia and Somaliland—which had been in place since December 2016, with the exception of the Hajj pilgrimage period—in order to stabilize its domestic meat supply.

In December 2024, Irro, who took office as President of Somaliland, split the Ministry of Livestock and Fishery Development into the Ministry of Livestock and Rural Development and the Ministry of Fishery and Marine Resources.

In January 2025, the Somaliland Ministry of Livestock closed a quarantine facility in Berbera and revoked the license of a businessman. Minister Omar Shuaib announced the move after the owner allegedly entered into an unauthorized agreement with the Somalia Federal Government, which Somaliland deemed a violation of its national sovereignty.

In March 2026, the Somaliland Ministry of Livestock inaugurated a modern veterinary laboratory in Berbera, the capital of the Sahil region. This facility was established to improve animal health monitoring and ensure the quality of livestock exports, which serve as a vital pillar of the national economy.

== Ministers ==
Image	Minister Name	Ministry Name	Term start	Term end
	Yasin Maqsud; Yasiin Maqsud	Ministry of Livestock; Wasaaradda Xannaanada Xoolaha	1991	1993
	Haibe Omar Magan; Haybe Cumar Magan	Ministry of Agriculture and Livestock; Wasaaradda Beeraha iyo Xannaanada Xoolaha	1993	1997
	Idris Ibrahim Abdi; Idiris Ibraahim Cabdi	Ministry of Livestock; Wasaaradda Xannaanada Xoolaha	July 2003	2010
	Ahmed Haashi Oday; Axmed Xaashi Oday	Ministry of Livestock, Rural Development and Rural Affairs; Wasaaradda Xannaanada Xoolaha, Horumarinta Reer Miyiga iyo Deegaanka; Ministry of Livestock, Environment and Rural Development; Wasaarada Xanaanada Xoolaha, Deegaanka iyo horu-marinta Reer Miyiga	July 2010	January 2011
	Abdi Aw Dahir Ali; Cabdi Aw Daahir Cali	Ministry of Livestock, Environment and Rural Development; Wasaarada Xanaanada Xoolaha, Deegaanka iyo horu-marinta Reer Miyiga	January 2011	
	Abdillahi Mohamed Dahir (Cukuse); Cabdilaahi Maxamed Daahir Cukuse	Ministry of Livestock; Wasaaradda Xannaanadda Xoolaha	February 2016	
	Hassan Mohammed Ali (Gafadhi); Xasan Maxamed Cali Gaafaadhi	Ministry of Livestock and Fishery Development; Wasaaradda Xannaanada Xoolaha iyo Horumarinta Kalluumaysiga	December 2017	December 2019
	Said Sulub Mohamed; Siciid Sulub Maxamed	Ministry of Livestock and Fishery Development	December 2019	
	Omar Shuayb Mohamed; Cumar Shucayb Maxamed	Ministry of Livestock and Rural development Wasaaradda Xannaanada Xoolaha iyo Horumarinta Reer Miyiga	December 2024	Incumbent
