= Vehicle registration plates of Somaliland =

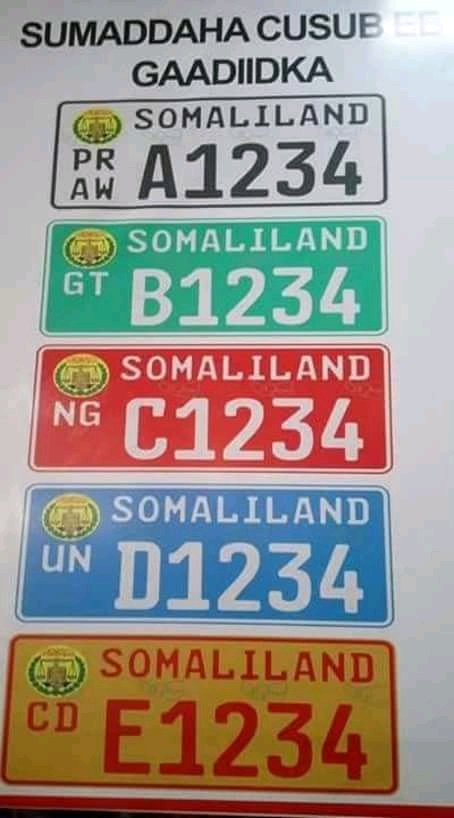
Somaliland vehicle registration plates

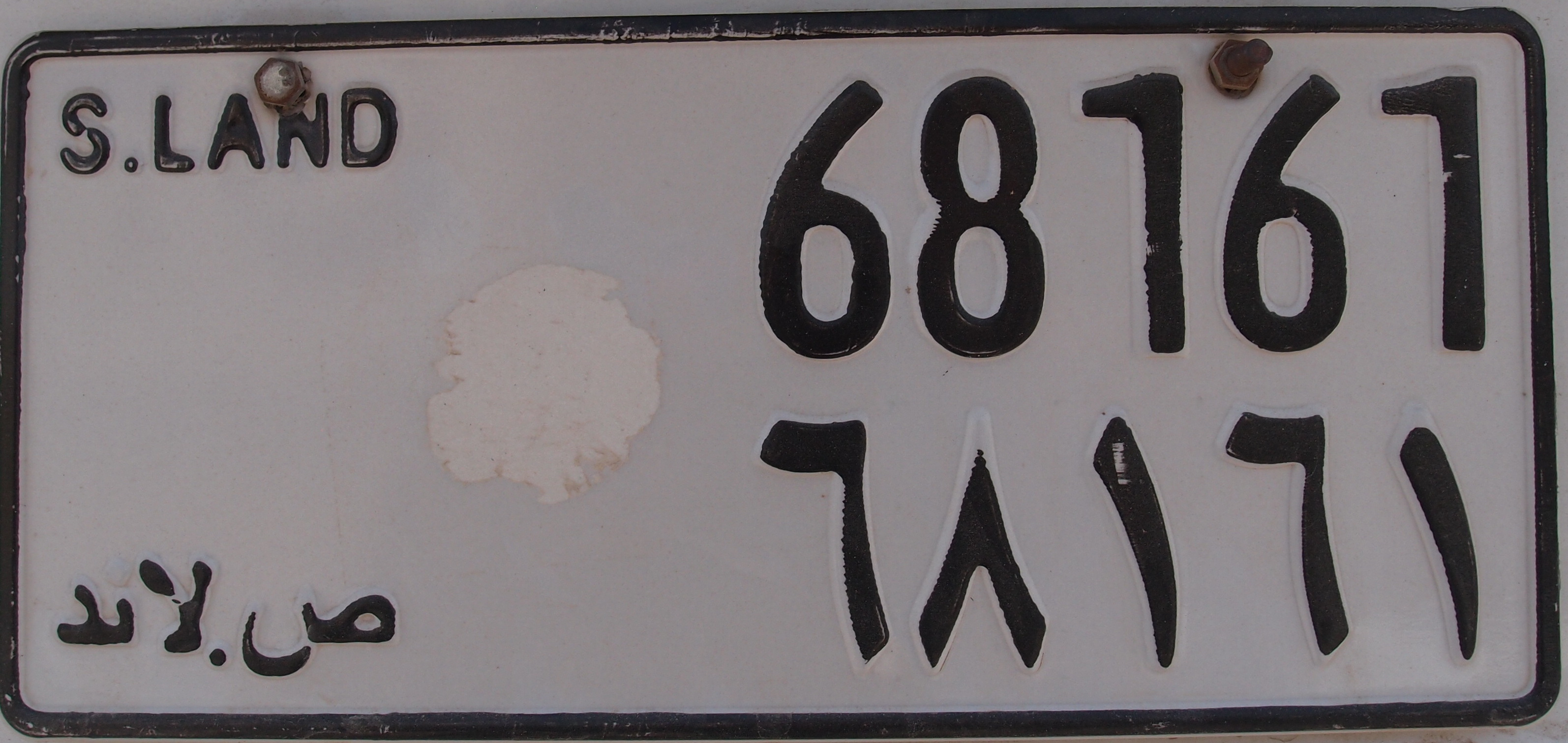
old Somaliland plate

Somaliland vehicle registration plates allow the identification of vehicles registered in Somaliland. Current plates are used from 2005. The writing is black on a white background. A plate's registration number and name of state are written in the Latin and Arabic alphabets. The name of the state in English is now in short from as "S.LAND".

== New System ==
In 2018, Somaliland introduced new vehicle registration plates of all types, for example private, diplomatic and government. The new private plates use the FE-Schrift. At the top of the plate, there is the name of the place and to the left of it, the Emblem of Somaliliand. Below it there are the letters “PR”, standing for private, and below it a code standing for one of the Administrative Divisions of Somaliland. The code can stand for the following divisions:

Code	Division
AW	Awdal
MJ	Maroodi Jeex
SL	Sool
SN	Sanaag
SX	Sahil
TG	Togdheer

== History ==
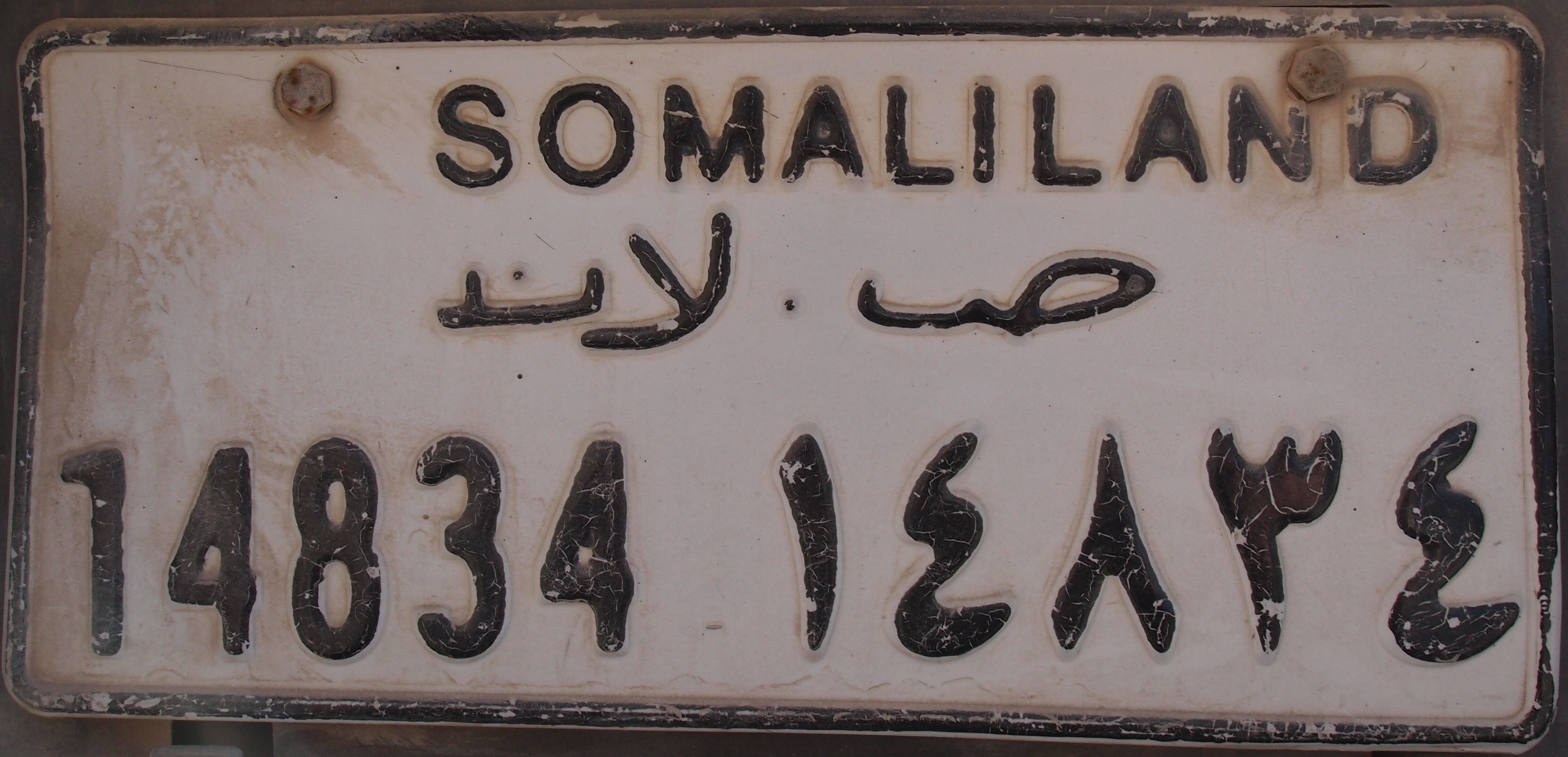
Old Somaliland plate

Somaliland introduced their own vehicle registration plate in 1996. Number on plate and name of state was written in Latin and Arabic, but name of state in English was written "SOMALILAND". This form was replaced by 2005 series.

== Special plates ==
- Government departments and offices of state: writing in white on a green background. Name of state in English is written "SOMALILAND" in 1996 version style.
- Foreign (humanitarian aid): writing in white on a red background. Name of state in English is written "S.LAND" in 2005 style.

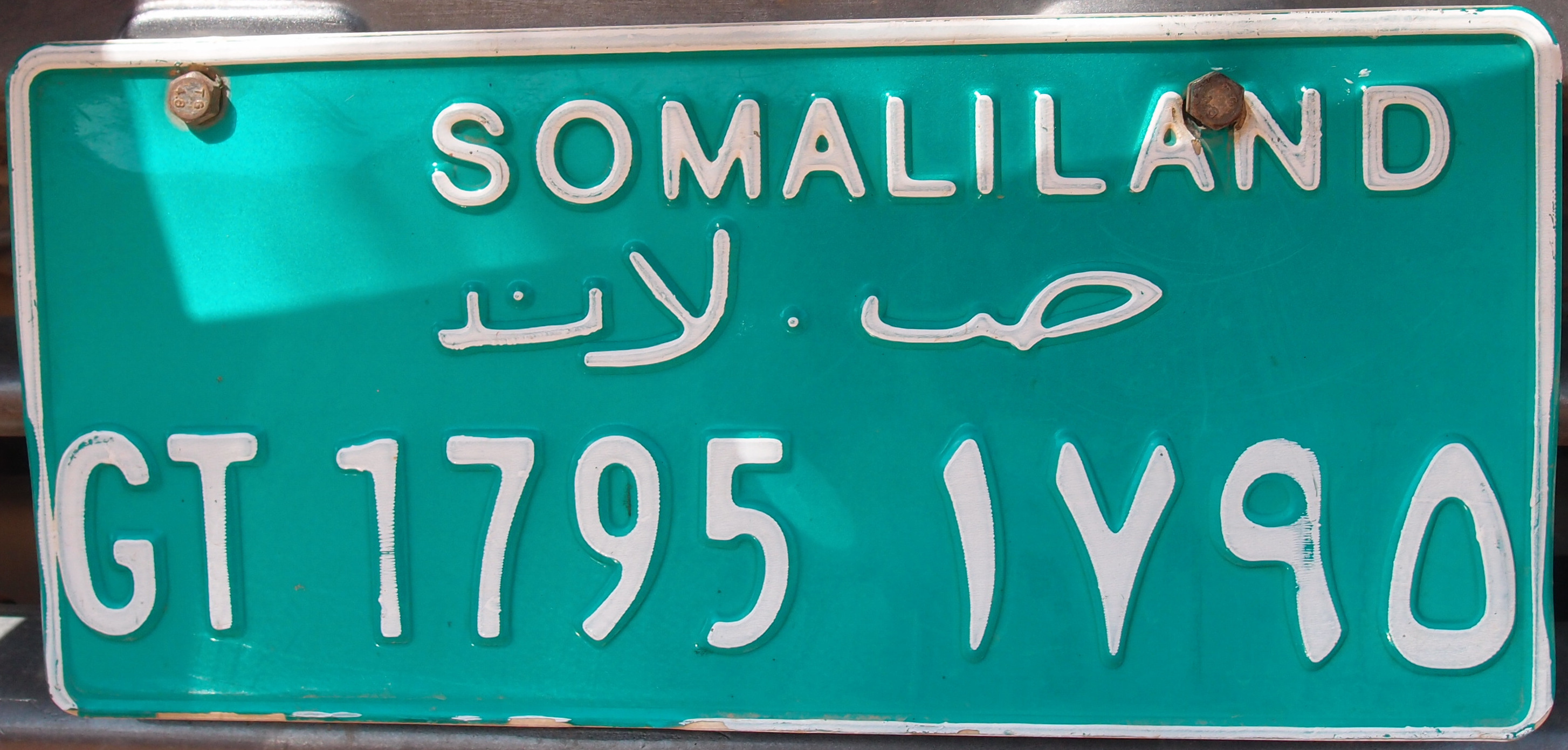
Government licence plate

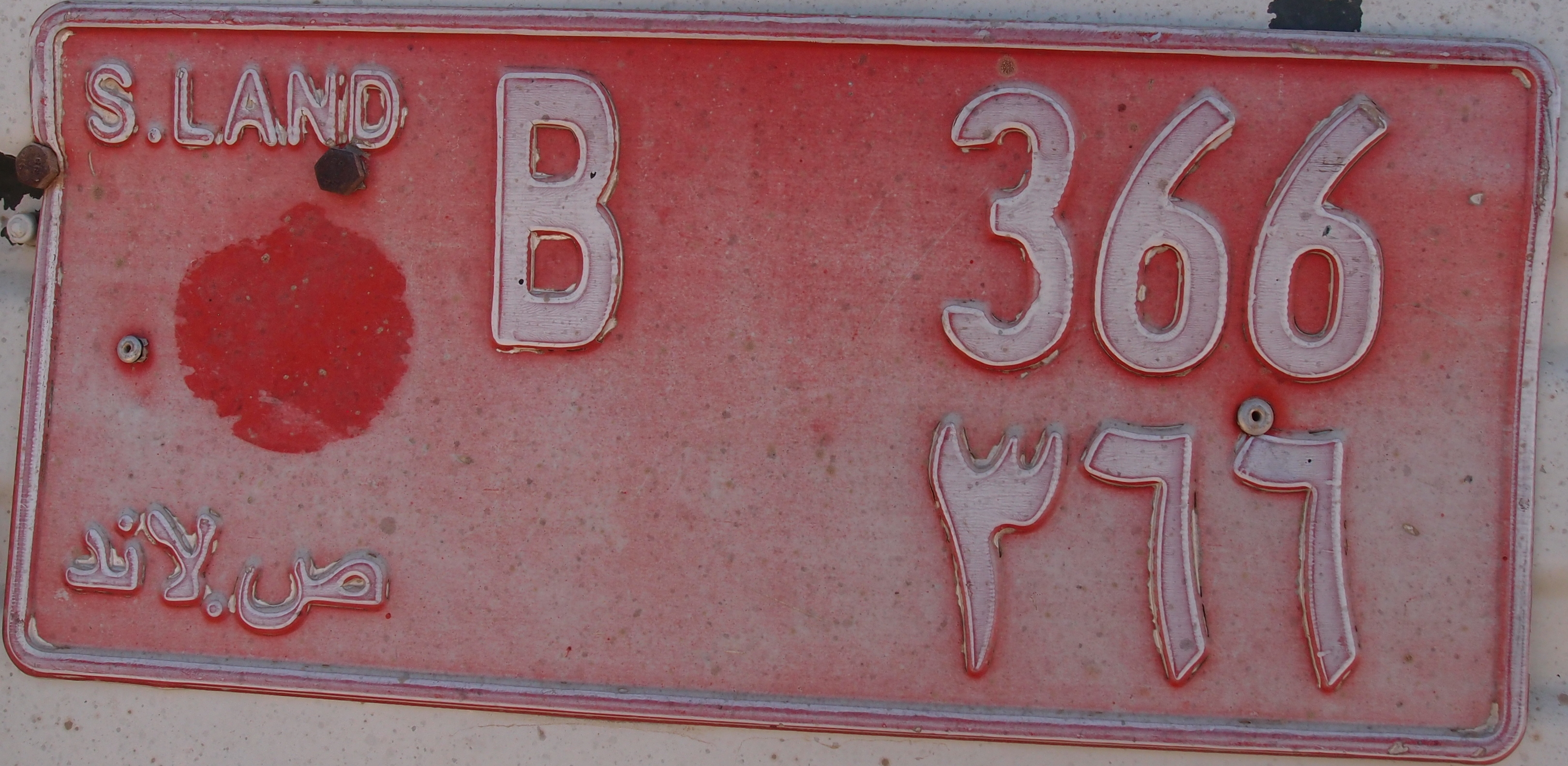
Special licence plate

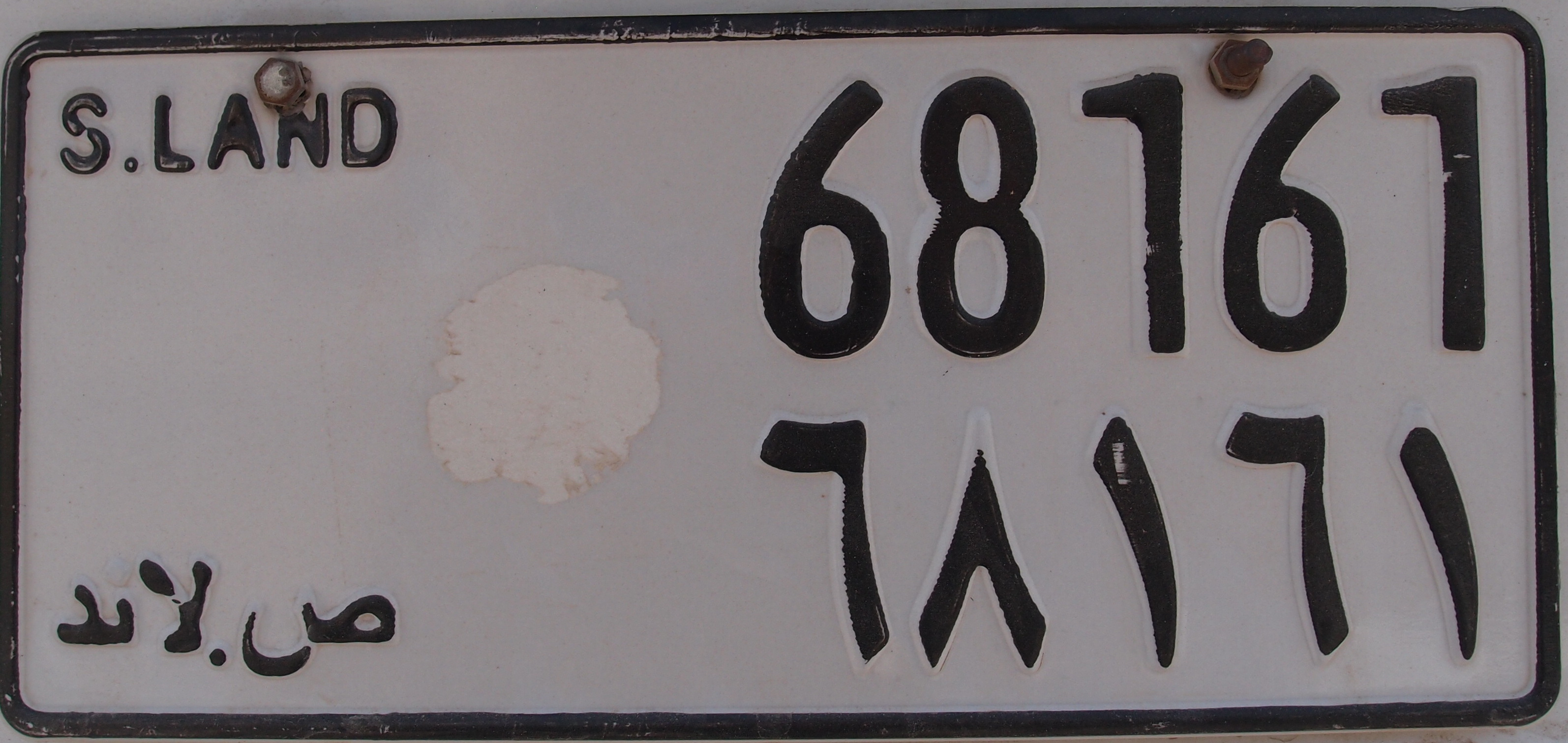
current licence plates
