= Mahamoud Sufi Mohamed =

Sheikh Sheikh Mahamoud Aw Sufi Mohamed
- Sheekh Maxamuud Suufi Muxumed
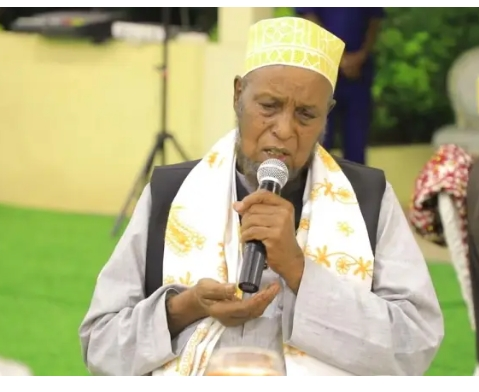

Minister of Religion and Endowments
- In office July 2003 – July 2010
- President: Dahir Riyale Kahin
- Succeeded by: Khalil Abdillahi Ahmed

Member of the Ulema Council
- In office June 2017 – 16 April 2023

Personal details
- Born: c. 1924/1925
- Died: 16 April 2023 Hargeisa, Somaliland
- Resting place: Abu-riin, southwest of Hargeisa

Sheikh Mahamoud Aw Sufi Mohamed (Somali: Sheekh Maxamuud aw Suufi Muxumed; c. 1924/1925 – 16 April 2023) was a Somaliland Islamic scholar, religious leader, and politician. He served as Minister of Religion and Endowments from 2003 to 2010 and later as a member of the constitutionally mandated Ulema Council from 2017 until his death.

Sheikh and Aw are an honorific and are often omitted.

== Biography ==
He was a Sufi-oriented Islamic scholar (Jamaaca Suufiya).

=== Constitution Preparation Committee ===
In 1997, Sheikh Mahamoud Aw Sufi Mohamed was selected as one of the 15 members of the Constitution Preparation Committee established at the Hargeisa Conference.

=== Religion Minister ===
In July 2003, President Dahir Riyale Kahin announced the third parts of cabinet, and appointed Sheikh Mahamoud Sufi Mohamed as Somaliland's Minister of Religion and Endowments. President Kahin submitted them to the House of Representatives for approval; two of the twelve nominees were rejected. While several approved ministers faced opposition or abstention votes, the Minister of Resettlement, Abdillahi Hussein Iman (Dirawal), and the Minister of Religion and Endowments, Sheikh Mahamoud Sufi, were approved unanimously. After being appointed Minister of Religion and Endowments, he resigned from the House of Elders (Guurti), and the Guurti approved his resignation by a majority vote.

In July 2010, Somaliland experienced a transfer of power, and Ahmed Mohamed Mohamoud “Silanyo” became president; Silanyo appointed Sheikh Khalil Abdillahi Ahmed as Minister of Religious Affairs, succeeding Sheikh Mahamoud Aw Sufi Mohamed.

=== Former Religion Minister ===
In August 2010, a nationwide Qur'an recitation competition was held in Hargeisa, and at the closing ceremony Sheikh Mahamoud Sufi Mohamed warned the participating youths not to neglect the Qur'an they had already memorized, saying that failing to uphold it could expose them to punishment.

=== Ulema Council ===
In January 2016, after a group of 17 Somaliland Islamic scholars reviewed the commercial banking bill submitted by the Somaliland government, a written statement signed by 12 scholars concluded that the draft law was contrary to Sharia and urged that it be halted; Sheikh Mahamoud Sufi Mohamed was among the scholars named in connection with the opposition to the bill.

The Somaliland Constitution establishes an Ulema Council that is independent of the government, and provides that it shall issue formal religious declarations in cases of religious disagreement and in matters where there is a dispute over whether something is contrary to Sharia, or where the Council itself considers it contrary to Sharia. However, the process took considerable time because there was no consensus on who should select the Ulema Council members or what criteria should be used, prompting public legal clarification of the constitutional appointment procedure. Ultimately, in June 2017, President Ahmed Mohamed Mohamoud “Silanyo” appointed 12 members to Somaliland's Ulema Council, and Sheikh Mahamoud Aw Sufi Mohamed was named as the second council member on the published list.

In July 2018, as inter-clan fighting continued in El Afweyn, the Somaliland government dispatched a delegation led by the Interior Minister, and Sheikh Mahamoud Aw Sufi Mohamed accompanied it as one of the country's prominent scholars.

On 16 April 2023, Sheikh Mahamoud Aw Sufi Mohamed died at the age of 98 in Hargeisa; he was later buried in Abu-riin, southwest of the capital.
