= Ministry of Public Works, Housing and Transport =

Government Ministry in Puntland

- Wasaaradda Hawlaha Guud, Gaadiidka iyo Guryaynta وزارة الأشغال العامة والإسكان والنقل

Agency overview
- Formed: 1 August 1998
- Jurisdiction: Government of Puntland
- Headquarters: Garowe, Puntland
- Minister responsible: Farah Awad Jama
- Website: https://mopwht.pl.so/

The Ministry of Public Works, Housing and Transport PWHT (Somali: Wasaaradda Hawlaha Guud, Gaadiidka iyo Guryaynta) is the government body of the Puntland Government in charge of planning, directing, controlling, and building the public infrastructure, transportation, housing and public assets. It was one of the first ministries established in 1998 in Garowe, the capital city of Puntland. Its headquarters are located in Garowe, and it has regional and district-level offices in Puntland. The first minister was Ahmed Abdi Mohamed, and the current minister is Farah Awad Jama.

== Overview ==
Following its formation, the Ministry has been engaged in the reconstruction and maintenance of government infrastructure and public buildings that serve the public, such as hospitals, schools, and community centres. In addition, in the area of land transportation in Puntland, the Ministry has focused on the development of public infrastructure. Alongside public buildings, the Ministry carries out extensive work in Puntland government areas. It also regularly inspects all the projects it manages, as well as those it contracts out to local companies.

The first administration of Puntland has officially legitimised the existence of the Northeast Highway Authority (NESHA) and established another public authority called PSAWEN, assigning them responsibilities under the Minister of the Ministry of Public Works, Housing and Transport of the Puntland Government. Politically, the Minister of Public Works, Housing and Transport shall administer these authorities, but financially and administratively, they shall be managed by their chairpersons, appointed by the President of the Puntland Government.

The third administration of the Puntland Government established three private companies, including PIITECH, Al-FATHI, and DBB, that provide technical facilitation services to the Transport Department of the Ministry of Public Works, Housing and Transport. The UN-Habitat agency assisted the Ministry of Public Works with a Land Secretariat Coordinator, who works in partnership with the land, construction, and quality control departments of the Ministry of Public Works, Housing and Transport.
