= Musa Kassim Omar =

Somali Surgeon and politician

Dr. Musa Kasim Omar
- موسى قاسم عمر

Minister of Commerce
- In office 20 May 2014 – 15 August 2016
- President: Ahmed Mohamed Mohamoud
- Preceded by: Mohammad Abdullahi Omar
- Succeeded by: Omar Shoaib Mohamed

Executive Director of Somaliland National AIDS Commission
- In office 2005–2007

WHO Emergency and Humanitarian Officer for Somalia and Somaliland
- In office 2003–2005

Personal details
- Born: Gabiley, British Somaliland
- Party: Peace, Unity, and Development Party
- Education: Somali National University
- Profession: Politician, Surgeon

Musa Kassim Omer (Somali: Muuse Qasim Cumar, Arabic: موسى قاسم عمر) is a Somali Surgeon and politician. He was the Minister of Commerce, Industries and Tourism of Somaliland between May 2014 and August 2016.

== Personal life ==
Omer was born in Gabiley, situated in the former British Somaliland protectorate. He spent his childhood in the town and Djibouti. He hails from the Isaaq clan.

In 1980, Omer earned a Doctor of Medicine from the Somali National University in Mogadishu.

He died in Hargeisa on 19 November 2025.

== Career ==
Omer previously served as the WHO Emergency and Humanitarian Officer for Somalia. He was also the Executive Director of the Somaliland National AIDS Commission (SOLNAC). In May 2014, Omer was appointed Minister of Commerce and International Investment of the northwestern Somaliland region of Somalia and he has been removed from his post in early 2016, after the Kulmiye Conference in the late of 2015.
