= Mohamoud Hassan Saad =

Somali politician

- Maxamuud Xasan Sacad
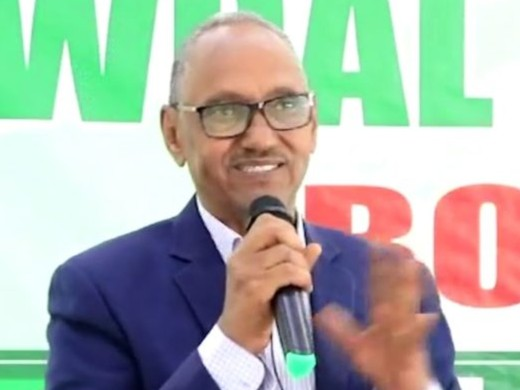
- Mahmoud Hassan Saad in 2019

Minister of Commerce
- In office 14 December 2017 – 14 December 2024
- President: Muse Bihi Abdi
- Preceded by: Omar Shoaib Mohamed
- Succeeded by: Abdirahman Hassan Nur Furre

Personal details
- Party: Peace, Unity, and Development Party

Mohamoud Hassan Saad (Somali: Maxamuud Xasan Sacad) also known as Saajin is a Somaliland politician, who is served as the Minister of Commerce, Industries and Tourism of Somaliland between 2017 and 2024. He was the Kulmiye nominee for vice president in 2024, unsuccessfully contesting the election as the running mate of the incumbent Muse Bihi Abdi.

== Biography ==
=== Early days ===
Saajin was born in 1949 in Jijiga, a town in the Ogaden region that had recently been under the British Military Administration.

He received his primary and intermediate education at schools in Quljeed and Sheikh, and later pursued higher studies at the institution that would become Amoud University. He studied at the former SIDAM (Somali Institute for Development Administration and Management) between 1974 and 1977, after which he obtained a master's degree in financial analysis from the London Business School in 1978.

He subsequently worked as a senior accountant at the Zakum Development Oil Company (ZADCO) in the United Arab Emirates (UAE).

In 2012, Saajin joined the ruling Kulmiye Party.

He worked at the ZADCO for thirty-eight years (until around 2016)

=== Minister of Trade, Industry and Tourism ===
In December 2017, newly inaugurated President Muse Bihi Abdi announced his cabinet and appointed Saajin as Minister of Trade, Industry and Tourism.

In July 2019, Saajin signed Somaliland’s first-ever policy to support micro, small and medium enterprises, which at the time were estimated to account for more than 90 percent of the country’s GDP.

In January 2021, Saajin instructed the Somaliland Ministry of Commerce to halve business registration fees in response to the economic downturn caused by the COVID-19 pandemic, and used the measure as an opportunity to push for a transition toward a one-stop shop system for business registration and licensing across government agencies.

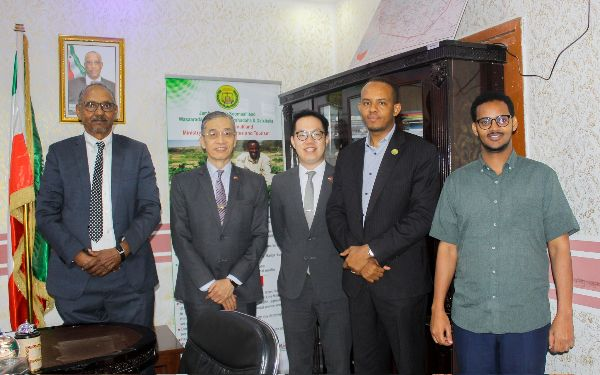
In August 2022, Saajin (furthest left) held an official meeting in Hargeisa with Allen C. Lou (second left), the Taiwan Representative to Somaliland.

At the end of July 2023, Saajin visited Taiwan in his capacity as Minister of Trade and Tourism and, together with Taiwan’s Minister of Economic Affairs Wang Mei-hua, signed a Memorandum of Understanding on Strengthening Business and Trade Relations between Taiwan and Somaliland, which aimed to promote two-way business exchanges, trade missions and the sharing of investment opportunities.

In August 2023, ahead of the presidential election, the Kulmiye Party selected incumbent President Muse Bihi Abdi as its presidential candidate and Saajin, then serving as Minister of Trade, Industry and Tourism, as its vice-presidential candidate. However, in the November 2024 presidential election the Kulmiye Party was defeated at the polls.

In October 2023, after the Ethiopian prime minister voiced a desire for access to a Somaliland port, Saajin stated that territorial lands are not something to be casually given away and that Somaliland would only accept port investments made through proper investment procedures and protocols.

On 14 December 2024, the new President of Somaliland, Abdirahman Mohamed Abdullahi (Irro), Waddani party, announced his cabinet and appointed Abdirahman Hassan Nur Furre as Minister of Commerce and Tourism, replacing Saajin in that post.

=== Kulmiye Party's vice-presidential candidate ===
After the ruling party shifted to Waddani, Saajin continued to be active in the Kulmiye Party as its vice-presidential candidate.

In April 2025, he visited Borama, where he was warmly welcomed by supporters.

== See also ==
- Ministry of Commerce (Somaliland)
- Somaliland Chamber of Commerce
- Politics of Somaliland
- List of Somaliland politicians

Political offices
Preceded by Omar Shoaib Mohamed	Minister of Commerce, Industries and Tourism; 2017–2024	Next: Abdirahman Hassan Nur Furre
