= Somaliland Chamber of Commerce =

- Founded: October 25, 1993; 33 years ago
- Location: Hargeisa
- Region served: Somaliland
- Chairman: Jamal Aydid Ibrahim
- Website: www.somalilandchamber.com

Somaliland Chamber of Commerce, Industries and Agriculture (SCoCIA) is an independent entity operated by the business community of Somaliland. Its role is to forge new bonds of commercial cooperation and opportunities between Somaliland and the rest of the world. The current chairman of the chamber is Jamal Aydid Ibrahim. The current general secratry of the chamber is Ibrahim Ismail Elmi.

== See also ==
- Ministry of Commerce (Somaliland)
- Somaliland Civil Service Commission
