= Garbadadar District =

Garbadadar
- District
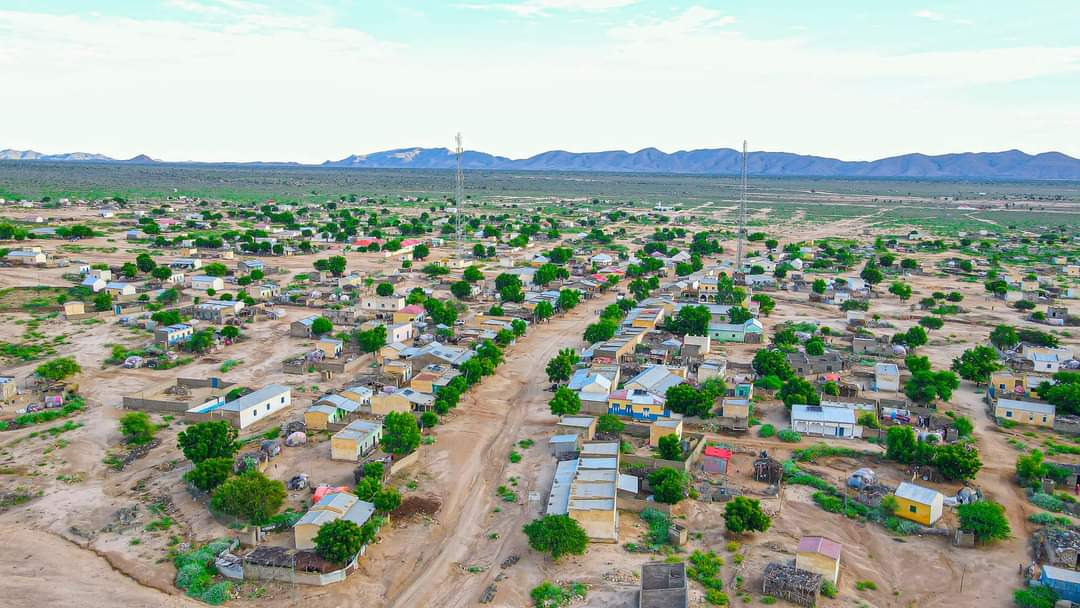
- Country: Somaliland
- Region: Salal
- Time zone: UTC+3 (EAT)

Garbadadar District is a district in the northwestern Salal region of Somaliland. Its formation was announced by the President of Somaliland, Dahir Riyale Kahin, in March 2008.

== History ==
Garbadadar District was officially established in 2008 as part of administrative reforms aimed at improving governance and service delivery in the western regions of Somaliland. Historically, the area has been inhabited by pastoralist communities engaged in livestock herding and seasonal migration within the Salal region.

== Geography ==
Garbadadar is located in the Salal region of Somaliland, an area characterized by semi-arid climate, plains, and seasonal water sources. The district lies within a region that supports pastoralism and limited agricultural activities, particularly during the rainy seasons.

== Demographics ==
The inhabitants of Garbadadar District are predominantly members of the Gadabuursi clan family. In particular, the majority belong to the Habar Muuse lineage of the Maxamed Case sub-clan of Gadabuursi. Among these, the most prominent sub-groups residing in the district include the Abreyn and Reer Maxamed lineages.

Historical population
Year	Pop.	±%
2005	18,000	—
2010	110,500	+513.9%
2015	223,000	+101.8%
2020	514,500	+130.7%
2024	889,000	+72.8%
Estimated population figures based on local administrative reports.

According to local estimates, Garbadadar District has experienced steady population growth over the past two decades. The population is largely rural and pastoral, with settlements expanding due to improved access to water sources and basic services. The population density remains relatively low compared to major urban centers in Somaliland.

== Economy ==
The local economy of Garbadadar District is primarily based on pastoralism, with livestock such as camels, goats, and sheep forming the backbone of livelihoods. Small-scale trade and informal markets also contribute to the district's economy. In recent years, there has been limited development in basic services and infrastructure.

== See also ==
- Administrative divisions of Somaliland
- Regions of Somaliland
- Districts of Somaliland
