= Abdullahi Abdi Omar =

Somaliland politician

Abdullahi Abdi Omar عبد الله عبدي عمر
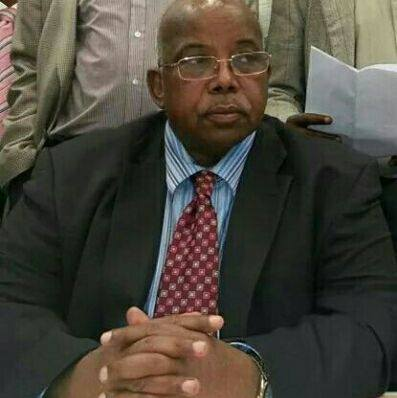
- Born: 1949 (age 76–77); British Somaliland (now Somaliland)
- Citizenship: Somalilander and British
- Occupation: Politician

Abdullahi Abdi Omar "Jawaan" (Somali: Cabdullaahi Cabdi Cumar Jawaan, Arabic: عبد الله عبدي عمر; born 1949) is a Somaliland politician who introduced the national emblem of Somaliland in 1996. Omar also served as one of the first commissioners of the National Electoral Commission in Somaliland.

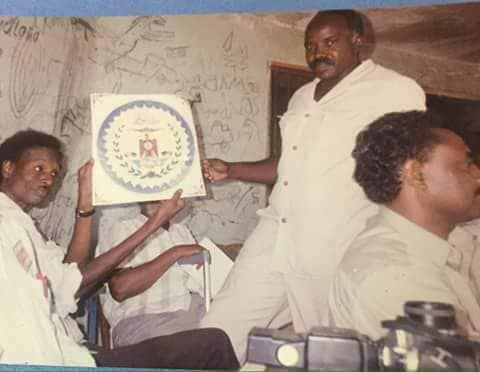
Abdullahi Abdi Omar (Jawaan) who introduced Somaliland national emblem in 1996.

== See also ==
- National emblem of Somaliland
