= Ibrahim Megag Samatar =

Somali politician

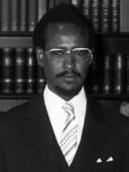

1st Speaker of the Somaliland House of Representatives
- In office 1991–1993
- Preceded by: Post established
- Succeeded by: Ahmed Abdi Mohamed

Personal details
- Born: c. 1939
- Died: 31 January 2011

Ibrahim Megag Samatar (aka Ibrahim Maygaag Samatar; c. 1939 – 31 January 2011) was a Somali politician and economist.

He is said to have been born in Hargeisa, British Somaliland, but he was born in Qullad, Ethiopia, a town between Hargeisa and Aware, Ethiopia.

He studied at Yale University and the University of California, Riverside in the United States, and returned to Somalia to become a bureaucrat in the Ministry of Finance. From 1970 to 1971, he was Minister of Finance in the cabinet of Siad Barre, who came to power after the coup d'état. After serving as Minister of Industry, he defected to the United States in 1981 when he was Ambassador to West Germany.

After his exile, he served as the North American representative of the Somali National Movement. He chaired the Somaliland House of Representatives at the 1991 conference in Burao, and was instrumental in Somaliland's independence. He was elected to the House of Representatives at the National Reconciliation Grand Council in Borama in 1993, but soon resigned and retired from politics. He came to Japan in 1997 and worked as a researcher at Josai International University.

== Personal life ==
His passport gave his date of birth as 20 February 1942 but is believed to have been born between 1939 and 1941. The BBC reported he was born in 1939. He died on 31 January 2011 at his home in Tōgane, Chiba Prefecture.
