= Shukri Haji Ismail =

Somali politician

Shukri Haji Ismail شكري حاجي اسماعيل
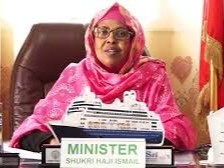

Minister of Environment and Rural Development
- In office 25 June 2013 – December 2024
- President: Ahmed Mohamed Mohamoud; Muse Bihi Abdi
- Preceded by: Mahamoud Said Mahamoud (Gacamey)
- Succeeded by: Abdillaahi Osman Jama (Geel-jire)

Personal details
- Born: Hargeisa, Somaliland
- Party: Peace, Unity, and Development Party
- Children: 1

Shukri Haji Ismail Bandare (Somali: Shukri Xaaji Ismaaciil Baandare) is a Somali politician, who was serving as the Minister of Environment and Rural Development of Somaliland.

== Biography ==
Shukri was born in Hargeisa as the daughter of Haji Ismail Bandare, and she had seven sisters. She was from the Habar Yoonis clan, specifically the Ali Sa’id sub-clan. Their father, who was strongly committed to educating his daughters, ensured that all of them received schooling.

After completing her primary education in Hargeisa, Shukri passed the entrance examination for the Burco Girls' School, a boarding school in Burao established by the British colonial authorities, which drew pupils from across British Somaliland and was known for its high educational standards and the care it provided for its students.

Shukri completed her schooling in Burao in 1964, by which time British Somaliland had merged with Italian Somaliland and become independent as Somalia; she then moved to the Somalia capital, Mogadishu, where she began studying nursing through a UNICEF scholarship, and among her teachers was Dr. Edna Adan Ismail. In addition to nursing, she also acquired skills in midwifery, and three years later she completed her nursing education. After graduating, Shukri first worked in Burao, and later served at a maternal and child health center in Hargeisa as well as at the Digfeer Hospital in Mogadishu.

While she was working in the capital, she travelled to Saudi Arabia to visit relatives, including an uncle who were performing the Hajj, and on her uncle's advice she began working there; in Saudi Arabia she married the diplomat Hussein Ahmed Nur and accompanied her husband to postings in countries such as Yemen, India, Saudi Arabia and the United Arab Emirates. After that, Somalia's economic situation deteriorated, and the Government had begun to adopt austerity measures, with the closure of some relatively less essential Somalia embassies overseas. In 1981 Shukri's husband was among the diplomats recalled to Somalia, but he resigned from his post and he and Shukri returned to the United Arab Emirates, where they both took up employment again.

In 1988, as fighting broke out in northern Somalia (the former British Somaliland) and the Somali National Movement (SNM) came into open conflict with the central government. Shukri and her family left the United Arab Emirates for the United States as refugees, facing pressure and accusations from Somalia embassies that they were providing financial support to the SNM.

=== Return to Somaliland ===
In 1993 Shukri returned to Hargeisa via Kalabaydh and began looking for ways to work in the fields of education and health, but her efforts were soon interrupted when civil conflict broke out again in Somaliland. To avoid the conflict, Shukri moved to Oodweyne.

In late 1995 Shukri became one of the founders of Candlelight, an organization aimed at improving education and health, and she became its chairperson. In 1997, as civil conflict in Somaliland came to an end, Candlelight added environmental issues to its programme of activities, and Shukri worked in the new focus.

=== National Electoral Commission ===
In 2002 Shukri became one of the seven members of the first Somaliland National Electoral Commission, and serving until 2007.

In Somaliland’s first presidential election, held on 14 April 2003, the National Electoral Commission finished tabulating more than 488,000 votes, the results showed that the acting president, Dahir Riyale Kahin of the United Democratic People’s Party (UDUB), had finished just 80 votes ahead of opposition candidate Ahmed Mohamed Mohamoud "Silanyo" of the Kulmiye party. Shukri later recalled that she was shocked by the narrow margin and that Kulmiye supporters outside NEC headquarters were already in a celebratory mood, convinced their candidate had won; she and her colleagues feared that if they did not announce the results quickly, people would suspect them of manipulating the count and that they "would not leave the building alive."

=== Environment Minister ===
In June 2013, Somaliland president Ahmed Mohamed Mohamoud "Silanyo" carried out a cabinet reshuffle, dismissing Mahamoud Said Mahamoud (Gacamey) as Minister of Environment and appointing Shukri in his place.

On 14 December 2017, newly elected president Muse Bihi Abdi announced his first cabinet. Shukri was reappointed to the same portfolio of Minister of Environment and Rural Development alongside the foreign minister, Saad Ali Shire. The former interior minister, Yasin Haji Mohamoud "Faratoon", remained in the cabinet as Minister of Education, meaning that only three of the twenty-three ministers had previously served as ministers in Silanyo's last cabinet.

In August 2018, the Ministry of Environment and Rural Development, in partnership with UNDP, launched a public awareness campaign to reduce charcoal production and consumption and curb deforestation across Somaliland. Speaking at the launch event in Hargeisa, Shukri said that learning about the environment and sharing ideas on how to protect it was the main focus of the national campaign.

In August 2019, Oxfam highlighted Shukri as Somaliland’s Minister of Environment and Rural Development who was tackling the impacts of climate change, including recurrent droughts, and as one of the founders of the environmental organization Candlelight, which had been working in partnership with Oxfam since the mid-1990s.

In December 2021, Shukri warned that plastic bags were causing severe damage to the environment and were being imported into Somaliland illegally, and she called on the public to eradicate both the use and importation of plastic bags altogether.

In May 2023, Shukri attended the opening ceremony of a factory in Hargeisa that processes the invasive tree mesquite (Garan-waaga) into charcoal, livestock feed and even food products for human consumption. Speaking at the event, she said that, as the Ministry of Environment and Climate Change, they warmly welcomed such domestically financed factories that provide alternative resources.

In July 2023, Shukri announced that the government would soon inaugurate a domestically owned factory to produce a new type of plastic bag that interacts with the soil and has a shorter lifespan than conventional bags, explaining that these bags were intended to replace the banned imported plastic bags that had previously harmed the environment.

On 14 December 2024, newly elected Somaliland president Abdirahman Mohamed Abdullahi "Irro" appointed Abdillaahi Osman Jama (Geel-jire) as Minister of Environment and Climate Change.

== See also ==
- Ministry of Environment and Rural Development (Somaliland)
- Politics of Somaliland
- List of Somaliland politicians
- Muse Bihi Abdi

Political offices
Preceded by Mahamoud Said Mahamoud (Gacamey)	Minister of Environment and Rural Development; 2013–2024	Next: Abdillaahi Osman Jama (Geel-jire)
