= Mohamed Ahmed Mohamoud =

Somaliland politician

Mohamed Awad
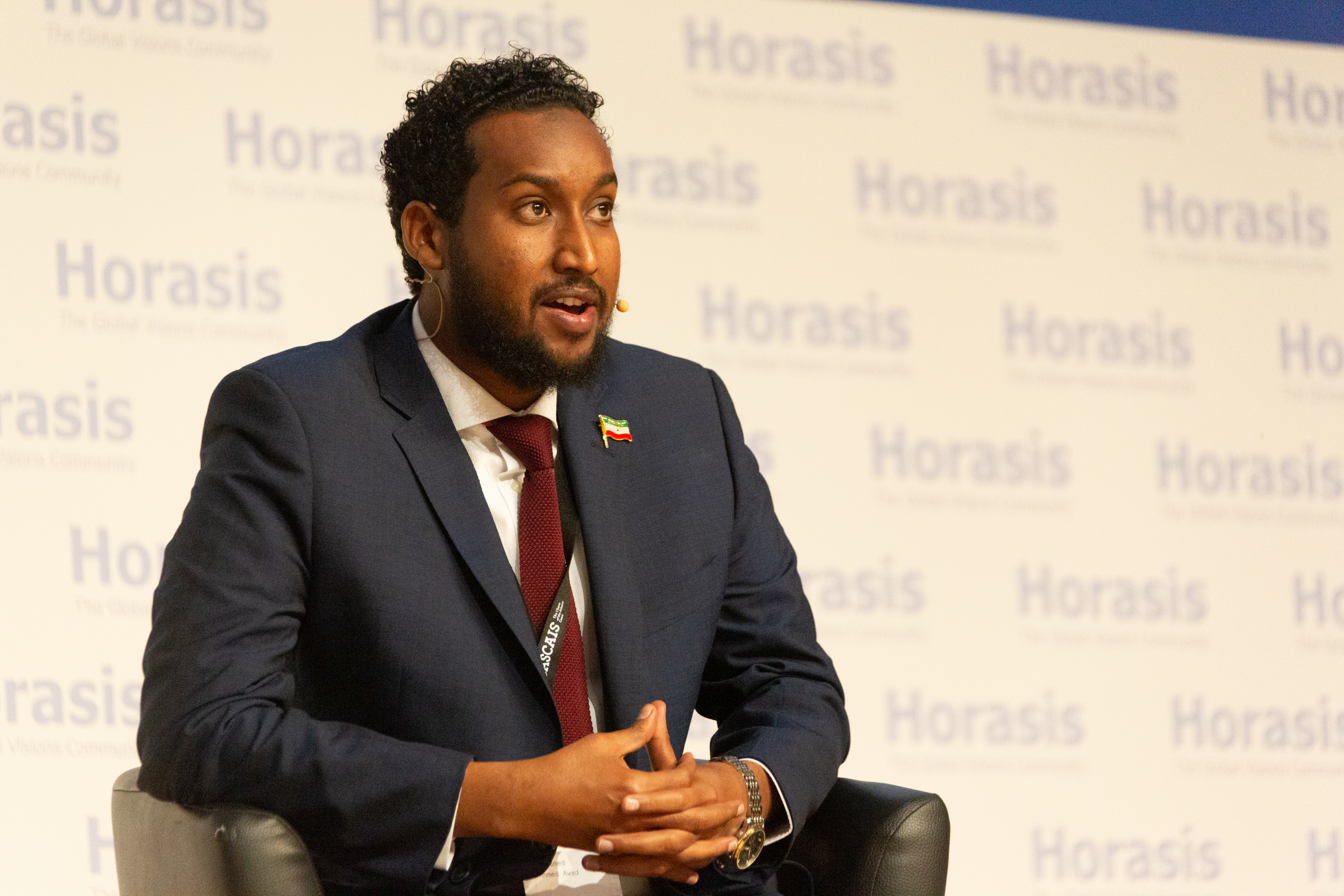

Minister of Investment Promotion
- Incumbent
- Assumed office 14 December 2017
- President: Muse Bihi Abdi
- Preceded by: Office established
- Succeeded by: Abdillahi Abdirahman

Personal details
- Party: Peace, Unity, and Development Party

Mohamed Ahmed Mohamoud Awad (Somali: Maxamed Axmed Maxamuud Cawad) is a Somali politician, who is currently serving as the Minister of Investment Promotion of Somaliland.

== See also ==
- Ministry of Investment Promotion (Somaliland)
- Politics of Somaliland
- List of Somaliland politicians

Political offices
Preceded by Office established	Minister of Investment Promotion; 2017–present	Incumbent
