= Fuad Adan Adde =

Somaliland politician

Fu'aad Aadan Cadde
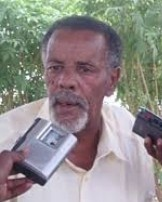
- Born: 1943; Hudun, Sool, British Somaliland
- Died: 15 July 2015 (aged 72); Turkey
- Resting place: Hargeisa
- Occupations: Politician, peacebuilder, businessman
- Spouse: 2
- Children: 10

Fuad Adan Adde (1943 – 15 July 2015, Somali: Fu'aad Aadan Cadde) was a Somaliland politician and peacebuilder. He held several political positions, including Minister of Rural Development and Presidential Advisor for the Eastern Regions of Somaliland.

== Biography ==
In 1943, Fuad was born in the Hudun district of the Sool region in British Somaliland. He belongs to Dhulbahante/Mahamud Garad/Naleye Ahmed clan.

He received his basic education in Las Anod and later attended the Sheikh Secondary School.

In 1960, following the independence and union of British Somaliland (State of Somaliland) and Italian Somaliland, he worked for the Central Bank of Somalia and eventually became a branch head. He later left the bank to become a businessman, taking contracts from oil exploration companies operating in Somalia.

=== Somaliland Independence War and Civil War ===
He later stated that between 1989 and 1991, a total of five of his brothers were killed by Somali National Movement (SNM), a military and political organization led by Isaaq clan. Three of them died on July 13, 1989, in Hudun, a village located between Las Anod and Erigavo. In March 1991, militias from Habr Je'lo and Habar Yoonis, affiliated with the SNM, raided the Sool region using technicals, killing more than 80 people and looting the area. The Dulbahante clan killed many members of the Isaaq in retaliation. There are also accounts suggesting that this was, in the first place, Isaaq’s revenge for Dhulbahante’s murder. However, Fuad later emphasized that this was a conflict between the Dhulbahante and the Habr Je'lo or Habar Yoonis, not between the Dhulbahante and the SNM or the Isaaq. At the second national meeting of the SNM Central Committee held in Burao in May 1991, a tentative reconciliation was reached.

=== After the Somaliland Civil War ===
In June 2002, Dahir Riyale Kahin, the interim president of Somaliland and a presidential candidate, was shot by Puntland forces while visiting Las Anod, where most of the residents are Dhulbahante, to campaign. During the opening of ASAD political association offices in Hargeisa, Fuad, as the organization's second vice-chairman, addressed the military escalation in Las Anod. He asserted that Dhulbahante interests were fundamentally aligned with Somaliland and urged a unified struggle to defend the nation's sovereignty against Puntland forces. Puntland took control of the region in 2003.

In December 2002, he was a leading figure in the ASAD political association, which failed to advance in the local elections.

In February or March 2004, amid military mobilizations in the Sool region, Fuad visited Adhi'adeye to persuade local Dhulbahante to support Hargeisa. During this visit, he narrowly escaped a clash with a Puntland technical. He subsequently became highly active in publicly urging Somalilanders to fight and be martyred for their territory.

=== Minister of Rural Development ===
He subsequently joined the ruling United Peoples' Democratic Party (UDUB) and was appointed as the Minister of Rural Development under President Dahir Riyale Kahin.

In March 2006, Fuad, serving as the Minister of Pastoral Development and Environment, opened several workshops addressing natural resource-based conflicts. He publicly attributed environmental devastation near Allaybaday to outside laborers hired by traders from the Gabiley District, specifically blaming the involvement of the district's educated elite in the destruction of local forests.

In October 2007, taking advantage of the conflict in Puntland, Somaliland forces seized control of Las Anod (Battle of Las Anod (2007)). Shortly thereafter, a Somaliland delegation led by Fuad visited Las Anod to discuss with local residents how to establish Somaliland administration in the Sool region. As a result of this incident, approximately 60% of the residents of Las Anod evacuated, and some residents staged protests, including burning tires. However, Somaliland's control was ultimately established and lasted until 2023.

In April 2008, President Dahir Riyale Kahin dismissed Fuad from his position as the Minister of Rural Development. The presidential decree cited violations of ministerial ethics, asserting that he frequently spoke without restraint. The dismissal followed a television interview where he strongly criticized the government's inaction in the Sool region.

=== Presidential Advisor for the Eastern Regions ===
After leaving his ministerial post, he became a heavyweight opposition leader in the Kulmiye party.

In July 2010, Kulmiye won the presidential election, he was appointed as the Presidential Advisor for the Eastern Regions by President Ahmed Mohamed Mohamoud Silanyo.

In November 2010, Silanyo dispatched a delegation of ten mediators, led by the Minister of the Interior, to Widhwidh. Fuad accompanied the delegation. In this role, he successfully resolved deadly conflicts between clans. During his presidential campaign, Silanyo had pledged to promote reconciliation in the eastern region (SSC militia probrem). President Silanyo is a member of the Habr Je'lo clan and a native of Burao in central Somaliland—closer to the east area than previous presidents—residents in eastern Somaliland trusted Silanyo.

=== Treatment and Death ===
In mid 2014, Fuad began recuperating in Hargeisa. He sustained hip joint injuries in a car accident inside the Presidential Palace in Hargeisa.

In mid August 2014, media outlets in Puntland reported that Fuad moved to the outskirts of Hudun, and was deeply outraged by the Somaliland government’s approach to oil exploration in the Sool region, and is attempting to flee to Puntland. In response, the Somaliland media later reported that while he went to Burao between five days, and was outraged by the deaths that occurred when the Somaliland military expelled Ali Khalif Galaydh from Sahdheer, he reiterated that we would never leave Somaliland.

In October 2014, Fuad stated that Somaliland would not reunite with Somalia, asserting that nobody could force them and that remarks regarding reunification had no bearing.

In an interview in May 2015, Fuad said he was planning to go to Turkey for treatment but was refused by the airline, which stated that it could not transport injured passengers. In late May 2015, Fuad was transferred from Hargeisa to Istanbul, Turkey, on a government-chartered private jet for medical treatment.

In July 2015, he died in a hospital in Turkey on the 15th of the month. He passed away around morning prayers after undergoing surgery, and his body was expected to be brought back to Hargeisa for burial. Following his death, a committee was appointed by presidential decree to organize his funeral. Condolences were sent to his family and the public, praising him as a veteran politician and a brave peacemaker. He was survived by two wives and ten children.
