= Abdillahi Abokor Osman =

Somali politician

Minister of Transportation
- Incumbent
- Assumed office 14 December 2017
- President: Muse Bihi Abdi
- Preceded by: Abdikhaliq Ahmed

Personal details
- Born: 1/03/1976 Hargeisa
- Party: Peace, Unity, and Development Party

Abdillahi Abokor Osman (Somali: Cabdillaahi Abokor Osman) is a Somali politician, who is currently serving as the member of national contracting authority and deputy minister of the interior Minister of Transportation and Roads Development of Somaliland.

== See also ==
- Politics of Somaliland
- List of Somaliland politicians

Political offices
Preceded by Ali Hassan Mohamed	Minister of Transportation and Roads Development; 2017–present	Incumbent
