= Mohammad Abdullahi Omar =

Somalilander politician

Mohammad Abdullahi Omar محمد عبدالله عمر
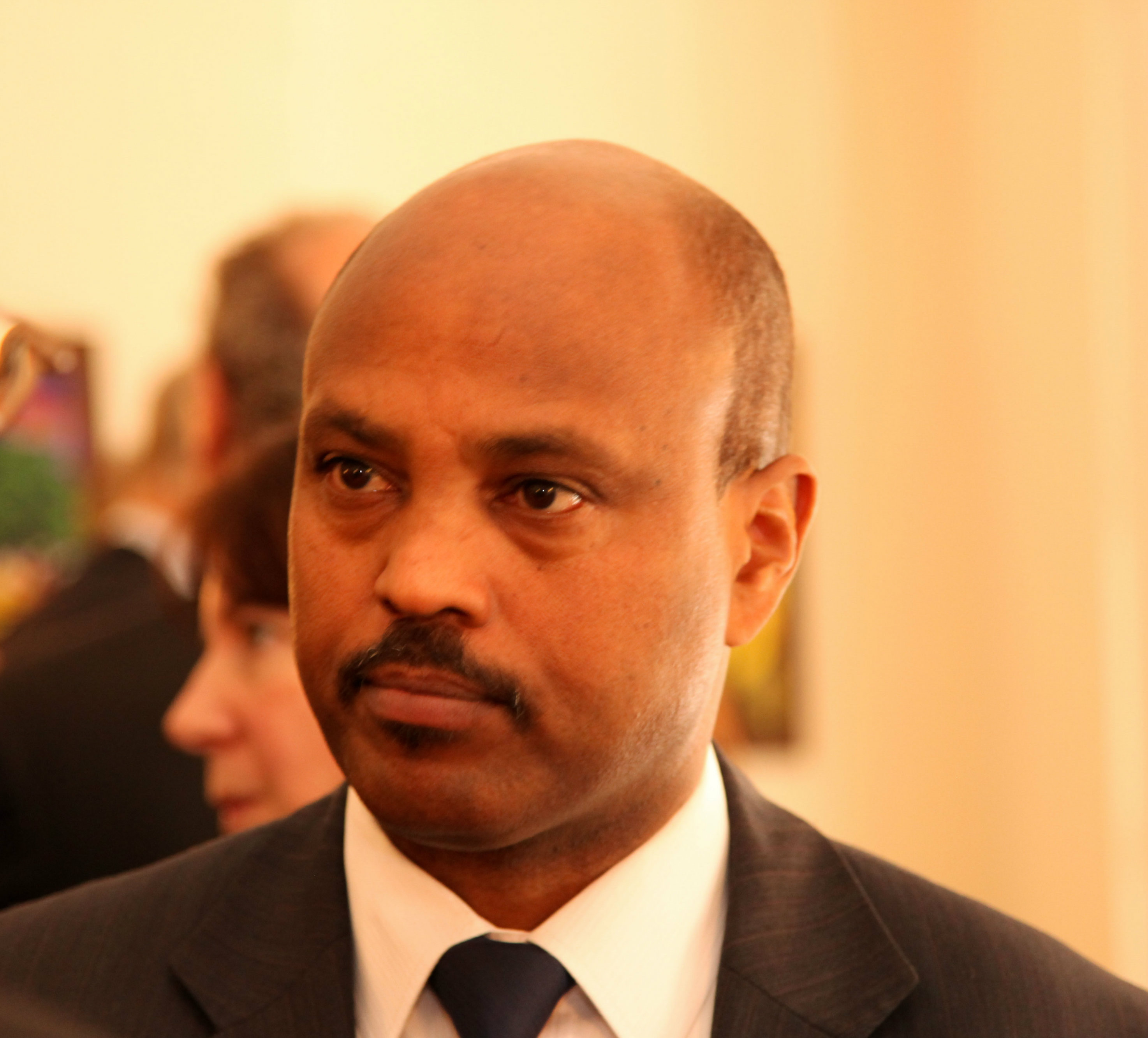
- Omar in 2013

Minister of Commerce
- In office June 25, 2013 – May 20, 2014
- President: Ahmed Mahamoud Silanyo
- Preceded by: Abdirizak Khalif Ahmed
- Succeeded by: Dr. Musa Kassim Omer

10th Minister of Foreign Affairs
- In office July 28, 2010 – June 25, 2013
- President: Ahmed Mahamoud Silanyo
- Preceded by: Abdilahi Mohamed Dualeh
- Succeeded by: Mohamed Bihi Yonis

Dr. Mohammad Abdullahi Omar (Somali: Maxamed Cabdulaahi Cumar, Arabic: محمد عبدالله اومار) is a Somalilander politician. He served as the Minister of Foreign Affairs of Somaliland. He was appointed to the position on July 28, 2010 by the region's incumbent President Ahmed Mahamoud Silanyo. Following a cabinet reshuffle on June 25, 2013, Omar was replaced as Foreign Minister by Mohamed Bihi Yonis. Omar subsequently served as Somaliland's Minister of Commerce until May 20, 2014, when he was dismissed from the position by presidential decree following an internal dispute over leadership succession within the ruling Peace, Unity, and Development Party (Kulmiye) party.
