= Abdirashid Haji Duale =

Somali politician

Abdirashid Haji Duale عبد الرشيد حاجي دعالة

Minister of Public Works and Housing
- Incumbent
- Assumed office 14 December 2017
- President: Muse Bihi Abdi
- Preceded by: Ali Hassan Mohamed

Personal details
- Born: 1963 (age 62–63) Bohotle, Somali Republic
- Party: Peace, Unity, and Development Party
- Spouse: Awo Suleiman Farah
- Children: 12
- Education: University of Hargeisa

Abdirashid Haji Duale Qambi (Somali: Cabdirashiid Xaaji Ducaale Qambi) is a Somali politician, who is currently serving as the Minister of Public Works and Housing of Somaliland. He is a long time standing politician and held many political positions since Somaliland declared its independence in 1991.

== See also ==
- Ministry of Employment, Social and Family Affairs (Somaliland)
- Politics of Somaliland
- List of Somaliland politicians

Political offices
Preceded by Ali Hassan Mohamed	Minister of Public Works and Housing; 2017–present	Incumbent
