= Ahmed Habsade =

Somali politician

Ahmed Abdi Habsade
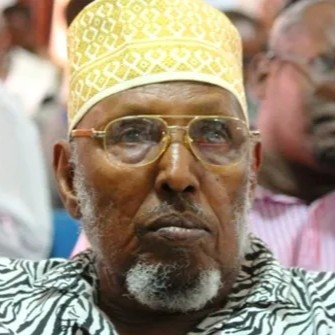

2nd Speaker of the Somaliland House of Representatives
- In office 1993–1997
- Preceded by: Ibrahim Megag Samatar
- Succeeded by: Ahmed Muhammad Aden Qeybe

Puntland Minister of Public Works, Housing and Transportation
- In office 1 August 1998 – 8 January 2005
- President: Abdullahi Yusuf Ahmed
- Vice President: Mohamed Abdi Hashi

Puntland Minister of Interior
- In office 25 January 2005 – 2007
- President: Mohamud Muse Hersi
- Vice President: Hassan Dahir Afqurac

Ahmed Abdi Mohamud Sugulle Habsade (Somali: Axmed Cabdi Xaabsade) is a Puntland and Somaliland politician. He was a decorated Colonel in the Somali Armed Forces and the second in command of the Somali Custodial Corps (Ciidanka Asluubta) equivalent to that of the Italian Arma dei Carabinieri but the Custodial Corps fall under the Ministry of the Interior and are part of the Police Force. A politician and respected elder later in life (he was instrumental in the founding of Somaliland and became the Speaker of the Somaliland House of Representatives. In 1998, he was appointed Minister of the Interior of Puntland but was dismissed in 2007 after a conflict with Mohamud Muse Hersi, who became President of Puntland in 2006. In 2007, he brought Somaliland troops into Las Anod, leading to Somaliland's effective control of the Sool region. He served as various Somaliland Ministers of state from 2008. In 2014, Abdiweli Gaas became President of Puntland and he come back to Puntland.

== Personal life ==
Habsade is from the Baharasame sub-clan of the Farah Garad branch of the Dhulbahante clan.

== History ==
=== Founding of Somaliland ===
Habsade became the second Speaker of the Somaliland House of Representatives at the 1993 Borama Conference but came into conflict with Ibrahim Egal, who became President of Somaliland.

=== Founding of Puntland ===
In 1995, he returned to Las Anod and participated in the establishment of Puntland.

In 1997, Habsade was dismissed as Speaker of the Somaliland House of Representatives.

In July 1998, the founding of Puntland was proclaimed, and Abdullahi Yusuf Ahmed became the first president. President Yusuf appointed nine heads of government, and Habsade was appointed Minister of Public Works, Housing and Transportation.

=== Transfer to Somaliland ===
Since the founding of Puntland, the ownership of the Sool region between Somaliland and Puntland had been ambiguous. However, in 2002, Dahir Riyale Kahin, who had become acting president of Somaliland after the death of the former president due to illness, inadvertently visited Las Anod to prepare for the presidential election the following year, which inspired Puntland to send troops to occupy Las Anod in 2002. In 2002, Puntland sent troops to occupy Las Anod. However, Puntland then focused on establishing the Transitional Federal Government of Somalia (later the Federal Government of Somalia), which led the residents of Sool region to believe that the Puntland government was neglecting the management of Sool region.

In 2007, news broke that Habsade was attempting to establish a regional administration in the Buuhoodle region independent of both Somaliland and Puntland. Puntland President Mohamud Muse Hersi recalled Habsade to the capital, Garowe, and dismissed him from his position as Interior Minister. In October 2007, Dhulbahante militiamen close to Habsade entered Las Anod and fought with pro-Puntland militias. As a result, thousands of residents fled, and most of the Dhulbahante clan chiefs also fled. For a while after that, Habsade lived in Las Anod. The clans living in Yagori also participated in the battle on the pro-Somaliland side and confronted Habsade for control of Las Anod. After that, the main Somaliland army entered Las Anod, and since then, Somaliland has been consistently in effective control of the area until now in 2021.

In 2008, Habsade became the Minister of Public Works and Housing in Somaliland and was one of the government representatives to the dialogue between Somaliland and the Federal Government of Somalia held in London in June 2012.

In February 2011, Habsade was appointed Somaliland's Information Minister.

In August 2011, Kalabaydh Mayor Mahad Cali Samatar accused Habsade of illegally removing him from office.

In January 2012, the Dhulbahante clan declared the establishment of a regional government, the Khatumo State, in the Sool region, independent of both Somaliland and Puntland. Habsade responded by declaring that Somaliland would not recognize the Khatumo State. By this time, Habsade had lost the trust of his clan for traveling back and forth between Somaliland and Puntland too often.。

In March 2012, Somaliland President Silanyo announced a cabinet reshuffle, with Habsade succeeding Ismaaciil Muumin Aar as Public Works Minister.

In May 2012, a conference on Somalia was held in Turkey. Four government Ministers from Somaliland announced their participation, and three of them entered the country with foreign passports for convenience. Still, Habsade pushed for the use of Somaliland passports and was denied a visa by the Turkish government.

In May 2013, a Somaliland independence ceremony was held in Las Anod in the Sool region, where Habsade also gave a speech.

=== Transfer to Puntland ===
In June 2013, President Silanyo announced a cabinet reshuffle, and Habsade was transferred from Minister of Public Works to "Presidential Advisor on Elections." His successor as Minister of Public Works is Abdirisak Khalif. It is said that Habsade was unhappy with this appointment. Habsade's influence was also diminished when Suleiman Haglotosiye, the anti-government "SSC movement" leader in the Dhulbahante settlement area, was attributed to Somaliland.

In August 2014, after meeting with Puntland President Gaas in Jijiga, Ethiopia, Habsade decided to return to Puntland, and attended a luncheon in Garowe, the capital of Puntland, via Galdogob, Ethiopia. In an interview with the BBC, he said, "I am retiring from politics, but I am ready to serve the government if Puntland asks me to."

He stayed for a while in Werder, Somali Region, Ethiopia, and then entered Bur Salah, Puntland, in September. In October, he addressed the opening session of the Puntland Parliament.

In June 2015, Puntland President Gaas and Vice President Abdihakin Abdullahi Omar Amey clashed over the treatment of Habsade. President Gaas insisted on Habsade's inclusion in the cabinet, but Vice President Amey opposed it because the powerful clan of Durbahante would not allow it. In addition, Vice President Puntland has been elected from the Dhulbahante clan for generations.

In March 2016, Habsade attended a rally supporting incumbent Ismaïl Omar Guelleh, along with Puntland's Vice President Amey, regarding the 2016 Djiboutian presidential election.

In June 2016, Habsade won one of the 11 Senate seats allocated to Puntland in the 2016 Somali parliamentary election. In the same June, Habsade called for the Dhulbahante community to work together to stop the clan warfare occurring in Dharkayn Geenyo, and the same month.

In January 2020, there was a confrontation between Puntland Vice President Ahmed Elmi Osman and President Said Abdullahi Dani. They and Puntland government officials held a meeting in Hadhwanaag in the Sool region to resolve the conflict. Habsade attend the meeting in his capacity as a "politician (Siyaasi.)"
