= Hassan Mohammed Ali =

Somali politician

Hassan Mohammed Ali حسن محمد علي
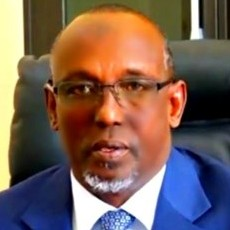

Minister of Planning and National Development
- Incumbent
- Assumed office 1 December 2019
- President: Muse Bihi Abdi
- Preceded by: Awale Ibrahim Shirwac

Minister of Livestock and Fisheries
- In office 14 December 2017 – 1 December 2019
- President: Muse Bihi Abdi
- Preceded by: Abdillahi Mohamed Dahir
- Succeeded by: Said Sulub Mohamed

Personal details
- Party: Peace, Unity, and Development Party

Hassan Mohammed Ali Gafadhi (Somali: Xasan Maxamed Cali Gaafaadhi) is a Somali politician, who currently serves as the Minister of Planning and National Development of Somaliland. He is the former Minister of Livestock and Fisheries of Somaliland.

== See also ==
- Ministry of Planning (Somaliland)
- Ministry of Livestock & Fisheries (Somaliland)
- Politics of Somaliland
- List of Somaliland politicians

Political offices
Preceded by Abdillahi Mohamed Dahir	Minister of Livestock and Fisheries; 2017–2019	Succeeded by Said Sulub Mohamed
Preceded by Awale Ibrahim Shirwac	Minister of Planning and National Development; 2019–present	Incumbent
