= Khalil Abdillahi Ahmed =

Somali politician

Khalil Abdillahi Ahmed خليل عبد الله أحمد
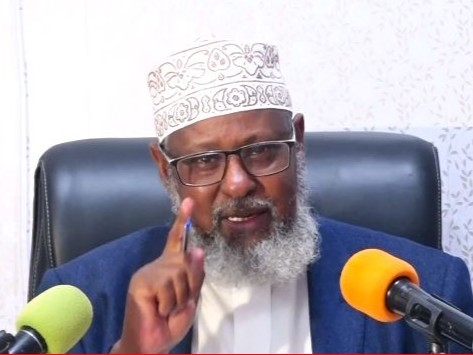

Minister of Endowment and Religious Affairs
- In office 28 July 2010 – 2 September 2021
- President: Ahmed Mohamed Mohamoud; Muse Bihi Abdi
- Preceded by: Mohamoud Sufi Mohamed

Personal details
- Party: Peace, Unity, and Development Party

Sheikh Khalil Abdillahi Ahmed (Somali: Shiikh Khaliil Cabdillaahi Axmed) is a Somali politician served as the Minister of Endowment and Religious Affairs of Somaliland since July 2010.

== Biography ==
=== Religion Minister ===
On 27 July 2010, President Ahmed Mohamed Mohamoud “Silanyo” appointed Sheikh Khalil Abdillahi Ahmed as Minister of Religion and Endowments of Somaliland.

In July 2012, Sheikh Khalil Cabdillaahi Ahmed issued official directives to imams and muezzins at mosques nationwide regarding the standardized observance of prayer times and the adhan during Ramadan. The key measures included synchronizing the adhan across mosques to prevent confusion, setting a 40-minute interval between the two dawn (Fajr) adhans, and fixing the interval between the adhan and iqama at 20 minutes in residential areas and 15 minutes in commercial areas.

In August 2015, responding to rumors that different Islamic sects were being taught in religious schools, Sheikh Khalil Abdillahi Ahmed stated that the claim was unfounded and that the only curriculum taught in Islamic education in Somaliland was Sunni Islam.

In August 2016, Sheikh Khalil Abdillahi Ahmed oversaw the detention and imprisonment of youths suspected of converting to Christianity in Somaliland.

In January 2017, amid a severe drought reported to be affecting more than half of Somaliland’s population, Sheikh Khalil Abdillahi Ahmed urged all sides to pursue ways to ease citizens’ hardships and to avoid politicizing the catastrophe.

In March 2017, Sheikh Khalil Abdillahi Ahmed strongly criticized a commercial banking bill under debate in the Somaliland parliament, arguing that it contained provisions that would facilitate the use of interest (riba) and could therefore contravene Islamic law and the constitution; however, he also stated that he was not opposed to banking as such, provided that it operates in compliance with Sharia law.

In April 2017, amid an ongoing drought in Somaliland, Sheikh Khalil Abdillahi Ahmed called on people nationwide to perform prayers for rain.

In August 2017, a Somaliland delegation comprising five ministers and led by the Minister of Foreign Affairs travelled to Saudi Arabia, and Sheikh Khalil Abdillahi Ahmed was among the ministers in the delegation.

In June 2019, a driver working with Somaliland’s drought committee publicly alleged that Sheikh Khalil Abdillahi Ahmed was taking a portion of their wages; Sheikh Khalil Abdillahi Ahmed rejected the claim.

In September 2020, reports circulated claiming that Christianity was being taught in Somaliland’s schools as part of the curriculum, but Sheikh Khalil Abdillahi Ahmed denied the allegation and said those spreading the rumor were seeking to sow discord in society.

In March 2021, Sheikh Khalil Abdillahi Ahmed announced that, due to inconsistencies within the country regarding the sighting of the new moon and the start of Ramadan, an official committee would be established under the leadership of the Ministry of Religion and Endowments, composed of religious scholars and representatives of relevant institutions, to determine the date officially.

In August 2021, during a COVID-19 pandemic–related ban on khat, a vehicle belonging to Sheikh Khalil Abdillahi Ahmed was seized on suspicion of carrying qat. In response, he stated that the incident was the result of the actions of drivers or aides and that he had no prior knowledge of it.

On 2 September 2021, President Muse Bihi Abdi dismissed Sheikh Khalil Abdillahi Ahmed as Somaliland’s Minister of Religion and Endowments and appointed Sh. Cabdirisaaq Xuseen Cali Albaani as his successor.

During his tenure, Sheikh Khalil Cabdillaahi Ahmed stated that he declared ten Ramadans and twenty Eids, stopped many artists’ performances, and at one point ordered hotels in Hargeisa to close for eleven nights.

== See also ==
- Ministry of Endowment and Religious Affairs (Somaliland)
- Politics of Somaliland
- List of Somaliland politicians

Political offices
Preceded by Mohamoud Sufi Mohamed	Minister of Endowment and Religious Affairs; 2010–2021	Succeeded by Abdirisaq Husein Ali
