= Ministry of Trade (Somaliland) =

Government ministry of Somaliland

Republic of Somaliland Ministry of Trade and Tourism
- Wasaaradda Ganacsiga iyo Dalxiiska Somaliland (MOTT)
- Coat of arms of Somaliland

Ministry overview
- Formed: 1995; 31 years ago
- Jurisdiction: Somaliland
- Headquarters: Hargeisa, Maroodi Jeh (Somaliland)
- Minister responsible: Abdirahman Hassan Nur Furre, Minister
- Website: mott.govsomaliland.org

The Ministry of Trade and Tourism of the Republic of Somaliland (MOTT, Somali: Wasaaradda Ganacsiga iyo Dalxiiska Somaliland) (Arabic: وزارة التجارة) is a cabinet ministry in the government of Somaliland. which is concerned with the regulation and implementation of policies applicable to domestic and foreign trade.

== Ministers ==
| Image | Minister | Term start | Term end |
|---|---|---|---|
| | Ismail Aden Osman | | May 1999 |
| | Abdirizak Khalif Ahmed | 27 July 2010 | 25 June 2013 |
| | Mohammad Abdullahi Omar | 25 June 2013 | 20 May 2014 |
| | Musa Kassim Omer | 24 May 2014 | 22 February 2016 |
| | Husein Adan Ige (Xuseen Aadan Cige Dayr) | 22 February 2016 | October 2016 |
| | Omar Shoaib Mohamed | 15 August 2016 | 14 December 2017 |
| | Mohamoud Hassan Saad Saajin | 14 December 2017 | 14 December 2024 |
| | Abdirahman Hassan Nur Furre | 14 December 2024 | Present |

== See also ==
- Politics of Somaliland
- Cabinet of Somaliland
