= Said Sulub Mohamed =

Somali politician

Said Sulub Mohamed سعيد سلوب محمد
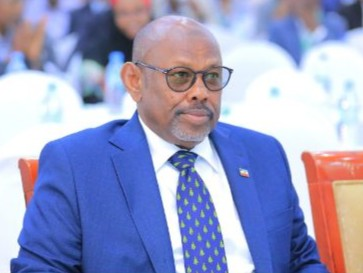

Minister of Livestock and Fisheries
- In office 1 December 2019 – December 2024
- President: Muse Bihi Abdi
- Preceded by: Hassan Mohammed Ali
- Succeeded by: Omar Shuayb Mohamed

Minister of Public Works and Housing
- In office 5 July 2003 – 27 July 2010
- President: Dahir Riyale Kahin
- Preceded by: Mohamed Nour Arrale
- Succeeded by: Hussein Ahmed Aydid

Personal details
- Party: Peace, Unity, and Development Party; United Peoples' Democratic Party

Said Sulub Mohamed (Somali: Siciid Sulub Maxamed) is a Somali politician, who was serving as the Minister of Livestock and Fisheries of Somaliland. He also served as the Minister of Public Works and Housing.

== Biography ==
Said Sulub is from the Garhajis clan.

=== Minister of Public Works ===
In July 2003, after winning April 2003 Somaliland presidential election, President Dahir Riyale Kahin announced the second round of appointments to his new cabinet and named Said Sulub as Minister of Public Works.

In April 2010, heavy rains, strong winds, and flooding struck Hargeisa, causing multiple casualties and affecting hundreds of residents. Said Sulub toured the affected areas jointly with the Minister of Interior and the Mayor of Hargeisa, expressed deep sorrow over the damage, and stated that the government would appeal to charitable organizations operating in the country to assist the victims.

In July 2010, Said Sulub held a press conference together with the Minister of Interior and the Chief of Police, denying media reports that government-owned vehicles had been embezzled ahead of the political transition. He announced that the authorities had investigated and inventoried the vehicles belonging to various ministries. However, he explained that when the government attempted to consolidate the vehicles, some garage owners refused to hand them over, and the resulting lack of coordination among institutions contributed to the confusion. He further stressed that there was no evidence that the outgoing administration had removed state assets and stated that they would continue monitoring the protection of national property until it was formally transferred to the new government.

In late July 2010, after President Ahmed Mohamed Mohamoud "Silanyo" took office in a change of government, he formed a new cabinet largely drawn from the newly ruling Kulmiye party and appointed Hussein Ahmed Aideed to replace Said Sulub as Minister of Public Works. In his outgoing remarks, Said Sulub highlighted road and bridge projects he said he had overseen and told the incoming administration, "for you in the new government, that begins from today."

=== Post-ministerial career ===
In May 2014, Said Sulub said he regretted that the ruling Kulmiye party was embroiled in internal disputes, warning that the government should not be drawn into party infighting at the expense of national responsibilities. He argued that such conflicts should be resolved in accordance with party bylaws and legal procedures, and that it was undesirable for the government to appear aligned with any particular faction. He further criticized the administration for weakening efforts to secure international recognition for Somaliland and placing excessive emphasis on dialogue with Somalia, asserting that greater diplomatic engagement with African states and Western countries was needed. Regarding his own political future, he indicated that, with about a year remaining before the elections, he might join one of the country’s three political parties.

In December 2014, Said Sulub argued that Somaliland should withdraw from the Turkey-mediated talks with the Somali government, saying they were launched in a rushed manner and had dragged on without producing substantive results. He also commented on rising tensions in the Awdal region, calling the mobilisation of militias deeply regrettable but blaming the situation on the government’s failure to adequately address grievances raised by Awdal’s traditional leaders, and criticized the incumbent administration on that basis.

In August 2017, the opposition Waddani party announced its party task forces, and Said Sulub was selected as one of the 16 members of its Economic Committee.

=== Minister of Livestock and Fisheries ===
In December 2019, President Muse Bihi Abdi reshuffled his cabinet, moving Hassan Mohammed Ali "Gaafaadhi" from the Ministry of Livestock and Fisheries Development to the Ministry of Planning and National Development, and appointing Said Sulub as his successor. Said Sulub was living in Turkey at the time of his appointment. Before that, he had been a staunch Waddani critic of the ruling Kulmiye administration, but after taking the post he emphasized that the president was working to unite the Somaliland public, and said he was joining that unification effort in order to contribute whatever he could.

In February 2020, President Muse Bihi Abdi, noting that the leaders of the opposition parties Wadani and UCID were both from the Garhajis clan, asked Said Sulub (the Garhajis member within his cabinet) to provide an explanation regarding a certain issue. However, Said Sulub refused, and the president therefore had to address the matter himself.

In March 2020, Said Sulub announced that, to address the depletion of marine resources, he would suspend the issuance of new commercial fishing licences, review four fishing licences granted by his predecessor, and review marketing agreements with countries such as Kenya, Eritrea, and Djibouti.

In August 2020, Said Sulub announced that, with government funding, he was advancing a fishing port construction project in Maydh, Sanaag Region, with an estimated cost of about $5.5 million and a planned duration of about 18 months, including related road works.

In June 2020, talks between the Federal Government of Somalia and the Somaliland government were held in Djibouti, attended by seven delegates from the Federal Government of Somalia, including the Minister of Interior and Federal Affairs, and seven delegates from Somaliland led by Foreign Minister Yasin Haji Mohamoud Faratoon, including Said Sulub.

In September 2021, at the groundbreaking ceremony for a project to expand the Burco livestock market, Said Sulub said that animals that have not undergone health inspections would no longer be allowed to be shipped out from the Burco livestock market, and that an area would be established inside the market to provide veterinary care for animals traded there.

In February 2022, a Somaliland delegation consisting of the Minister of Foreign Affairs, the Minister of Livestock Said Sulub, the Minister of Finance, and the Minister of Planning visited Taiwan.

On 11 August 2022, police opened fire on opposition demonstrators who feared the president was seeking to delay the presidential election, killing at least six people. When Said Sulub attended the victims' funeral, dozens of mourners wearing red headbands began throwing stones at him after the burial; he managed to flee the crowd, but his vehicle was reportedly damaged. Said Sulub claimed that the attack was incited by the leadership of the opposition Waddani party. In late August 2022, Sultan Ahmed Caddo-Gude, described as a leading elder of the Garhajis clan, was arrested; it was reported that the move was directed by President Muse Bihi Abdi and that Said Sulub (himself from the Garhajis clan) was involved in carrying out the arrest.

In October 2023, Said Sulub announced that the Somaliland government would suspend the export permits for livestock bound for Saudi Arabia because the animals did not meet required health standards, and that exports would remain halted until the livestock had received proper health inspections and appropriate sanitary management was ensured.

In December 2024, President Abdirahman Mohamed Abdullahi "Irro," who took office following a transfer of power between the ruling and opposition parties, announced his cabinet and appointed Omar Shuayb Mohamed as Minister of Livestock.

== See also ==
- Ministry of Livestock & Fisheries (Somaliland)
- Politics of Somaliland
- List of Somaliland politicians

Political offices
Preceded by Mohamed Nour Arrale	Minister of Public Works and Housing; 2003–2010	Succeeded by Hussein Ahmed Aydid
Preceded by Hassan Mohamed Ali	Minister of Livestock and Fisheries; December 2019–December 2024	Next: Omar Shuayb Mohamed
