= Salal, Somaliland =

Region in Somalia

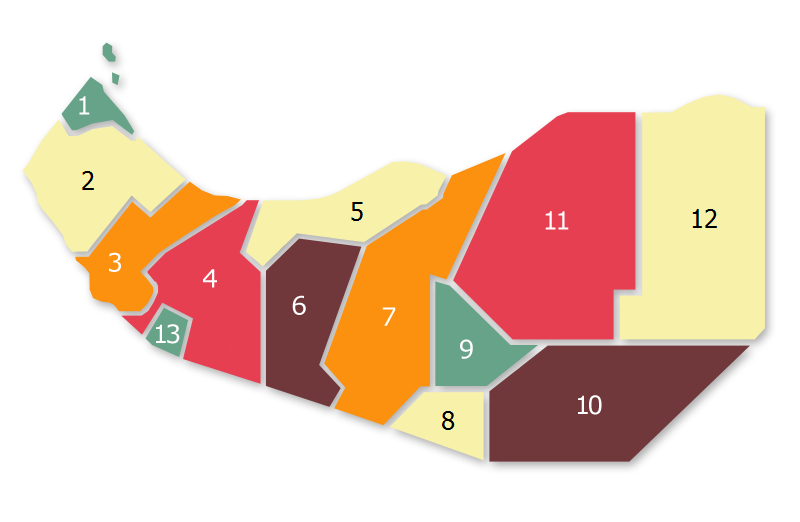
Regions of Somalia

Salal (Somali: Salal, sometimes called Salel; Arabic: صالال) is a newly appointed province in Somaliland. Before its formation in mid 2009, the province was part of the Awdal region.

Garba Dadar and Xariidad districts were formed within the region.

Currently, Zeila is the regional seat of the government.
