= Abdirisaaq Ibraahim Mahamed =

Somali politician (born 1969)

Abdirisaaq Ibraahim Mahamed "Ataash" عبدالرزاق ابراهيم محمد اتاش
- Abdirisaq Ibrahim Maxamed "Ataash"

Personal details
- Born: 1969 (age 56–57) Saaxdheer, Sool
- Party: Peace, Unity, and Development Party
- Education: Open University

Abdirisaaq Ibraahim Mahamed ("Ataash") (Somali: Abdirisaq Ibrahim Maxamed "Ataash"; born 1969, Las Anod) is the Post and Telecommunications Minister of the autonomous region of Somaliland.

A member of the Peace, Unity and Development Party, he has held his current office since August 2010. From 1981 to 1985, Attash attended secondary schools in Mogadishu, Somalia. He performed his mandatory in the military service from 1986 to 1987. He migrated to Europe in 1995, where he continued his education, studying in Denmark and England. He attended college at The Open University, and earned a Bachelor's Degree with honors in Social Sciences. He participated in the founding of the Nugaal University, the development in the Field of Education in the region of Sool, the development of health in Sool, and the reconciliation conference in Widhwidh.

== Sources ==
- Somlailand President Appoints a Committee for Sool and Sanaag Conflict, archive.org. Accessed 29 February 2024.
