= Mohamed Adan Elmi =

Somali politician

Mohamed Adan Elmi محمد ادم علمي
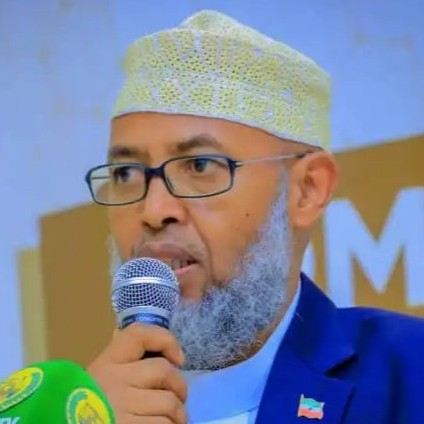

Minister of Parliamentary Relations and Constitutional Affairs
- Incumbent
- Assumed office 14 December 2017
- President: Muse Bihi Abdi
- Preceded by: Ahmed Haji Dahir

Personal details
- Party: Peace, Unity, and Development Party

Mohamed Haji Adan Elmi (Somali: Maxamed Xaaji Aadan Cilmi) is a Somali politician currently serving as the Minister of Parliamentary Relations and Constitutional Affairs of Somaliland since December 2017.

== See also ==
- Ministry of Parliamentary Relations and Constitutional Affairs
- Politics of Somaliland
- List of Somaliland politicians

Political offices
| Preceded by Ahmed Haji Dahir | Minister of Parliamentary Relations and Constitutional Affairs; 2017–present | Incumbent |
