= Abdirisak Khalif =

Somali politician (born 1967)

Abdirisak Khalif Ahmed
- Cabdirisaaq Khaliif Axmed عبدالرزاق خليف احمد
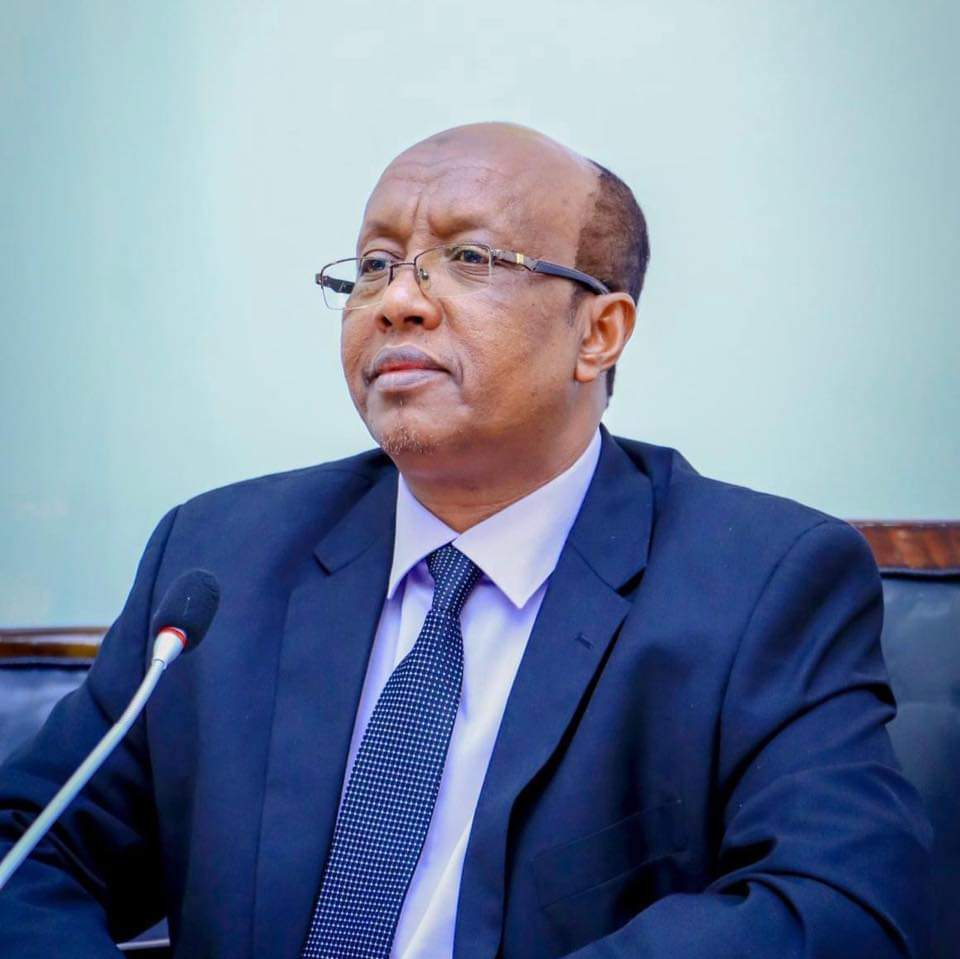
- Khalif Ahmed in 2021

6th Speaker of the Somaliland House of Representatives
- In office 3 August 2021 – 11 June 2023
- President: Muse Bihi Abdi
- Preceded by: Bashe Mohamed Farah
- Succeeded by: Yasin Haji Mohamoud

Minister of Commerce, Industries and Tourism of Somaliland
- In office 27 July 2010 – 25 June 2013
- President: Ahmed Mohamed Mohamoud
- Succeeded by: Mohammad Abdullahi Omar

Personal details
- Born: 1967 (age 58–59) Las Anod, Somalia
- Citizenship: Somalia

Abdirisak Khalif Ahmed (Somali: Cabdirisaaq Khaliif Axmed) is a Somaliland politician, who was formerly the speaker of Somaliland's Lower House of Parliament (House of Representatives). He previously served as Somaliland's Minister of Commerce during the Siilaanyo administration.

During the 2021 Somaliland parliamentary election Abdirisak, from the main opposition party Waddani, won the first round of voting with 42 votes, beating his competitor Yasin Haji Mohamoud Hiir aka "Faratoon", from the ruling Kulmiye party, who had 39 votes.

In June 2023, Abdirisak resigned as the speaker of the House of Representatives and defected to the SSC-Khatumo Administration, which sought to rejoin Somalia as an autonomous state amid the Las Anod conflict. Abdirisak had been sent to the region to help negotiate a resolution to the fighting but sided with the SSC-Khatumo's leaders and accused the Somalilander military of committing war crimes, for which a legal prosecution was launched against Abdirisak by the Somalilander attorney general. He is the highest ranking Somalilander to defect during the conflict.

== Overview ==
Abdirisak Khalif Ahmed was born in 1967 in Las Anod, Somaliland. He completed his primary education in Las Anod and later moved to Somalia for further studies.

== See also ==
- List of Somalis

New title	Minister of Commerce; 2010-2013	Succeeded by Mohammad Abdullahi Omar
Preceded by Bashe Mohamed Farah	Speaker of House of Representatives of Somaliland; 2021-2023	Succeeded by Yasin Haji Mohamoud
