= National emblem of Somaliland =

National emblem of the Region of Somaliland

National Emblem of Somaliland

Versions
- Eagle of Saladin of Somaliland
- Armiger: Republic of Somaliland
- Adopted: 14 October 1996; 29 years ago

The national emblem of Somaliland (Somali: Astaanta Qaranka Somaliland, Arabic: شعار أرض الصومال), was introduced on 14 October 1996 along with the flag of Somaliland, when it was approved by the National Conference. It was introduced by Abdullahi Abdi Omar (Jawaan).

== Description ==
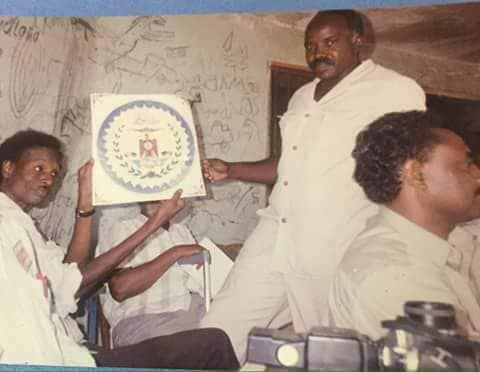
Abdullahi Abdi Omar (Jawaan) who introduced the national emblem of Somaliland in 1996.

The emblem consists of an equally balanced scales symbolising justice between the citizens of Somaliland, the coffee-coloured eagle of Saladin holds the scales as a sign of democracy, two hands shaking representing the equality and freedom between the people of Somaliland, an olive branch symbolising peace amongst the people of Somaliland, a yellow background representing the bright, beautiful culture and people of Somaliland. The Islamic calligraphy above the scales reads the Bismillah which if translated into English means In the name of Allah, Most Gracious, Most Merciful. This is to symbolize that Islam is the official religion practised in Somaliland.

The Constitution of Somaliland, as approved on May 31, 2001, by referendum reads:

Article 7: The Flag, the Emblem and the National Anthem

2. The emblem of the nation shall consist of a coffee coloured falcon with (the words), in Arabic language, “Allahu Akbar” (God is great) inscribed on its breast. Below the eagle are two hands shaking, and a set of scales hang above it and come down on both of its sides. The falcon (and the scales and hands) are in turn surrounded on both sides and below by two strands of green leaves intertwined at the base, and with the Arabic Bismillah inscribed at the top gap between the two leaves.

- Note that the Allahu Akbar was removed from the emblem for unknown reasons and a golden image was replaced in its place. Also, the color of the Bismillah was adapted; from a brown color to a red color.

== British Somaliland emblems ==
=== 1903–1950 ===
The first emblem of British Somaliland

When the British annexed and occupied the area that encompasses Somaliland in 1903, they established a protectorate and made it part of the British Empire. The British developed a flag for the region and also an emblem. The emblem featured a white disc with an image of a Kudu, one of the main antelopes in Somaliland. The emblem was also featured on the flag.

=== 1950–1960 ===
The last emblem of British Somaliland and the first and only emblem of short-lived State of Somaliland

During 1950, the emblem of British Somaliland was adapted and changed to a very intricate emblem. The coat of arms consisted of an escutcheon divided vertically, green and blue, having a chief with a Somali shield in front of two spears in saltire, heads downwards, in natural colours. The green portion contained a representation of a minaret in white, and the blue portion had an Arabian dhow in full sail on waves of the sea, with a golden anchor in the base. A Kudu's head, with the Royal Crown between the horns – all in natural colouring, on the "wreath of the colours." i.e. gold and green – forming the Crest.

British Somaliland Protectorate gained independence as the State of Somaliland on 26 June 1960 while retaining its colonial emblem, and united with Italian Trust Territory of Somalia on 1 July 1960, to form the Somali Republic.

== See also ==
- Flag of Somaliland
