= List of Somaliland politicians =

This is a list of notable politicians from Somaliland.

== Presidents ==
- Abdirahman Ahmed Ali Tuur – 1st President of Somaliland
- Muhammad Haji Ibrahim Egal – 2nd President of Somaliland
- Dahir Rayale Kahin – 3rd President of Somaliland
- Ahmed Mohamed Mohamoud – 4th President of Somaliland
- Muse Bihi Abdi – 5th President of Somaliland
- Abdirahman Mohamed Abdullahi -current and 6th President of Somaliland

== Vice presidents ==
- Hassan Isse Jama – first Vice President of Somaliland
- Abdirahman Ahmed Ali Tuur – second Vice President of Somaliland
- Abdirahman Aw Ali Farrah – third Vice President of Somaliland
- Dahir Rayale Kahin – fourth Vice President of Somaliland
- Ahmed Yusuf Yasin – fifth Vice President of Somaliland
- Abdirahman Saylici – current and sixth Vice President of Somaliland

== Ministers ==
- Yasin Haji Mohamoud – Member of Somaliland Parliament, former Foreign Minister, former Minister of Education, and former Minister of Interior
- Mohamed Kahin Ahmed – current Minister of Interior
- Dr. Saad Ali Shire – current Minister of Finance, former Foreign Minister and former Minister of Planning
- Abdiqani Mohamoud Aateye – current Minister of Defence and former Minister of Justice
- Mohamed Muse Diriye – current Minister of Water and former Minister of Information
- Omar Ali Abdillahi – current Minister of Health
- Ahmed Mumin Seed – former Minister of Agriculture
- Jama Mohamoud Egal – current Minister of Energy and Minerals
- Mohamoud Hassan Saad – current Minister of Commerce, Industries and Tourism
- Yusuf Mire Mohamed – former Minister of Youth and Sports
- Ahmed Mohamed Diriye – current Minister of Education and Science
- Abdirashid Haji Duale – current Minister of Youth and Sports
- Abdiweli Sheikh Abdillahi – current Minister of Telecommunications
- Ahmed Mohamed Diriye Toorno
- Hinda Jama Hersi
- Shukri Haji Ismail
- Mustafe Mohamoud Ali
- Mohamed Ahmed Mohamoud
- Hassan Mohammed Ali
- Khalil Abdillahi Ahmed
- Said Sulub Mohamed
- Mohamed Adan Elmi
- Abdillahi Abokor Osman
- Saleban Yusuf Ali – current Minister of Information, Guidance and Culture
- Hussein Abdi Dualeh –former Minister of Energy and Minerals
- Mohammad Abdullahi Omar – former Foreign Minister
- Hussein Mohamed Mohamoud ''Hussein Hog'' – former Minister of Health
- Suleiman Haglotosiye – former Minister of Health
- Ali Said Raygal – former Minister of Youth and Sports
- Adan Ahmed Elmi – former Minister of Agriculture
- Edna Adan Ismail – former Foreign Minister
- Hassan Haji Mohamoud – former Minister of Education
- Hussein Ali Duale – former Minister of Finance
- Mohamed Yonis – former Foreign Minister
- Ali Hussein Ismail – Former Minister of planning

== Other politicians ==
- Abdikarim Ahmed Mooge – current mayor of Hargeisa
- Abdurrahman Mahmoud Aidiid – former mayor of Hargeisa
- Bashe Mohamed Farah – former Speaker of the House of Representatives of Somaliland
- Mahamed-Amin Omar Abdi current mayor of Gabiley
- Abdishakur Mohamoud Hassan – current mayor of Berbera
- Ali Ibrahim Jama – former governor of Somaliland's Central Bank
- Abdirahman Mohamed Abdullahi – former Speaker of the House of Representatives of Somaliland
- Ali Omar Mohamed – former manager of Berbera Port
- Mohamed Hassan Maidane – former mayor of Borama and current MP of Somaliland
- Hussein Mohamed Jiciir – former mayor of Hargeisa
- Adan Haji Ali – current chief justice of Somaliland
- Faysal Ali Warabe – chairman of the UCID party
- Yusuf Warsame Saeed – former mayor of Hargeisa
- Khadra Haji Ismail yonis (X Geid) – former deputy mayor of Gebiley former general director of presidential palaces
- Khadra Hussein Mohammad – former national deputy prosecutor of Somaliland
- Mohamed Sahal Eidle- CEO of Som Migration Solutions and former director of National Displacement and Refugee Agency
