= Abdiaziz Mohamed Samale =

Somali politician

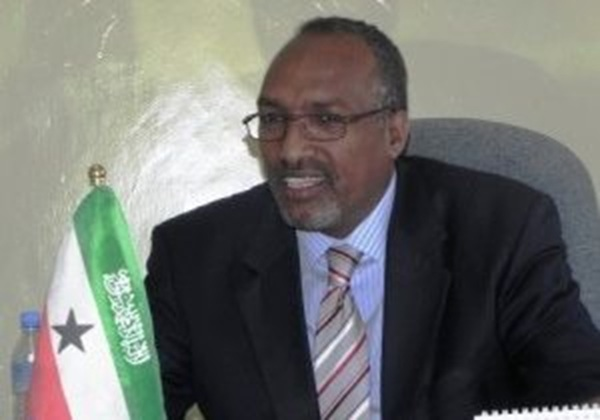

Minister of Finance of Somaliland
- In office 14 March 2012 – February 2015
- Preceded by: Mohamed Hashi Elmi
- Succeeded by: Zamzam Abdi Adan

Minister of Education of Somaliland
- In office February 2015 – 30 October 2015
- Preceded by: Zamzam Abdi Adan
- Succeeded by: Abdillahi Ibrahim Habane

First Deputy Speaker of the House of Representatives
- In office 2005–2011

Personal details
- Party: Kulmiye

Abdiaziz Mohamed Samale (Somali: Cabdicasiis Maxamed Samaale) is a Somaliland politician who has served as First Deputy Speaker of the Somaliland House of Representatives, Minister of Finance, Minister of Education, and as a senior figure in the ruling Kulmiye party.

== Biography ==
Abdiaziz Mohamed Samale belongs to the Reer Geelle, Sa'ad Musa clan.

Abdiaziz Mohamed Samale previously worked as a university lecturer.

=== First Deputy Speaker of the House of Representatives ===
Abdiaziz Mohamed Samale served as First Deputy Speaker of the Somaliland House of Representatives from 2005 to 2011.

During preparations for the 2011 Kulmiye party congress, Abdiaziz Mohamed Samale announced his intention to run for the party leadership, a move that was seen as disregarding a 2008 agreement reached in Burao—against the backdrop of internal party tensions—under which stakeholders had accepted that Muse Bihi Abdi would be recognized as Kulmiye party leader if he won the presidential election and that no challenge to the party leadership would be made; this deepened internal divisions, led to the congress being postponed at least twice, and was ultimately resolved through internal mediation that resulted in an agreement that no one would challenge Muse Bihi Abdi, making Muse Bihi Abdi the sole candidate at the party congress held in mid-2014.

=== Finance Minister ===
On 14 March 2012, President Ahmed Mohamed Mohamoud “Silanyo” dismissed Finance Minister Mohamed Hashi Elmi and appointed Abdiaziz Mohamed Samale as his replacement.

In March 2013, a Somaliland delegation led by President Silanyo made a five-day visit to the United Arab Emirates (UAE), accompanied by Abdiaziz Mohamed Samale, who was serving as Minister of Finance.

In March 2013, rumors circulated alleging that Abdiaziz Mohamed Samale had links to Islamist extremist groups, but he denied the claims at a press conference and the controversy subsequently subsided.

In February 2014, Abdiaziz Mohamed Samale was formally approved as a member of the Kulmiye party’s executive committee; until then, despite serving as a Kulmiye-affiliated minister, he had not been given a formal party post.

In mid-2014, Abdiaziz Mohamed Samale faced criticism for favoring his home region of Gabiley, with Somaliland Sun commenting that he appeared to be “more like the Finance Minister of Gabiley than the Finance Minister of Somaliland.” HargeisaPress further criticized him by stating that he not only favored people from Gabiley but even showed preferential treatment within Gabiley itself toward those closer to his own background.

In January 2015, Somali media reported allegations that Somaliland’s intelligence service was intercepting mobile phone communications, and Abdiaziz Mohamed Samale was listed among the reported targets.

=== Education Minister ===
In February 2015, Finance Minister Abdiaziz Mohamed Samaale and Education Minister Zamzam Abdi Adan swapped posts in a cabinet reshuffle announced by President Silanyo.

On 30 October 2015, President Silanyo appointed Abdillahi Ibrahim Habane as Somaliland's minister of education in a cabinet reshuffle.

=== Kulmiye party’s executive committee ===
In April 2017, Abdiaziz Mohamed Samale, a member of the Kulmiye party’s executive committee, reiterated his support for Muse Bihi Abdi as the party’s presidential candidate in the scheduled presidential election.

In May 2021, during the local council and parliamentary elections, the ruling Kulmiye party received strong support in Gabiley, and Abdiaziz Mohamed Samale accompanied a party delegation led by President Muse Bihi Abdi during a visit to the area, where he called on the public to support the party.

In November 2023, the ruling Kulmiye party and the main opposition Waddani party held a high-level meeting, in which Abdiaziz Mohamed Samale participated in his capacity as Kulmiye’s 1st Deputy Chairman; the talks were described as successful and resulted in agreement that national unity and the interests of the Republic of Somaliland should take priority, that the parties should unite in defense of the state, and that matters related to elections should be handled by the National Electoral Commission.
