= Yusuf Mohamed Abdi =

- Yuusuf Maxamed Cabdi Raage
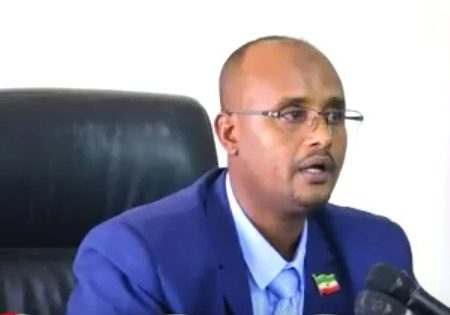

Minister of Finance of Somaliland
- In office December 2017 – 10 November 2018
- President: Muse Bihi Abdi
- Preceded by: Zamzam Abdi Adan
- Succeeded by: Saad Ali Shire

Personal details
- Party: Kulmiye Party
- Education: Master's degrees in public administration, public finance, and international trade facilitation and development

Yusuf Mohamed Abdi (Somali: Yuusuf Maxamed Cabdi Raage), also known Rage (Raage) is a Somaliland politician who served as Minister of Finance from December 2017 to November 2018 and later held positions including membership in the Higher Education Commission and the Central Council of the Kulmiye party.

== Biography ==
Yusuf Mohamed Abdi is from the Garhajis clan.

Yusuf Mohamed Abdi has been described as holding three master's degrees: public administration, public finance, and international trade facilitation and development.

Before becoming Minister of Finance, Yusuf Mohamed Abdi had 18 years of work experience at Somaliland's Ministry of Finance and Accounting. He worked in Somaliland's Ministry of Finance from a clerk (karaani) up to serving as a head of customs (maamule kastam).

=== Finance Minister ===
In December 2017, Yusuf Mohamed Abdi was appointed Minister of Finance in Somaliland. He formally took over the post from his predecessor Zamzam Abdi Adan. He was described as the youngest Minister of Finance to date.

After becoming Minister of Finance, he set out three main priorities: personnel reforms including replacing officials who had served since 1992, setting budgets based on revenue rather than spending, and increasing tax revenues.

In April 2018, Yusuf Mohamed Abdi denied claims that taxes had been increased on essential consumer goods and said the government was working on measures to address inflation.

In July 2018, Yusuf Mohamed Abdi praised and honored staff from the inland revenue (land tax) department in Awdal after the region's tax collections rose to second place nationwide, behind the Maroodi Jeex region.

In August 2018, Yusuf Mohamed Abdi dismissed many Ministry of Finance advisers from the previous administration and appointed six new advisers.

In early November 2018, a dispute emerged between the Minister of Finance and the Auditor General over administrative authority and oversight within the Ministry of Finance, centering on disagreements about decision-making processes and the limits of ministerial intervention in the Auditor General's office; the debate highlighted tensions between ensuring effective executive management and safeguarding the institutional independence of financial oversight bodies. On 10 November 2018, Yusuf Mohamed Abdi was dismissed as Minister of Finance and reassigned outside the cabinet to the Higher Education Commission (HRC); he said he was satisfied with being removed from the council of ministers, pleased with his new role, and thanked President Muse Bihi Abdi for previously appointing him to lead the finance ministry. Regarding his dismissal, Commerce and Industry Minister Mohamoud Hassan Saad said it was not due to personal conflict or political maneuvering, but rather stemmed from problems in administrative procedures and decision-making within the Ministry of Finance, where organizational tensions had intensified.

=== Post-ministerial activities ===
In October 2021, Yusuf Mohamed Abdi issued a statement calling for legal action against individuals he accused of treason for participating in Somalia's electoral process under the name of Somaliland, including a group claiming to be a Somaliland election commission, self-styled Somaliland traditional elders, participants who put themselves forward as “Somaliland representatives” for Somalia's Upper House, and politicians who organized and incited the effort.

In January 2024, Yusuf Mohamed Abdi welcomed the Somaliland–Ethiopia agreement on access to Somaliland's coastline, praising it as beneficial to both countries.

In October 2024, a wave of resignations by government officials was reported, including Yusuf Mohamed Abdi, who was a member of the Higher Education Commission and a member of Kulmiye's Central Council. As many as 160 people left the ruling Kulmiye party, and Yusuf Mohamed Abdi was among those who resigned during that period.
