= Ahmed Adan Buhane =

Somaliland politician and former Minister

- Axmed Aden Buuxane
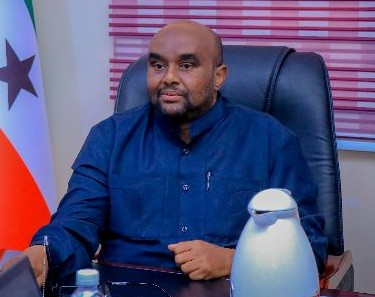

Minister of Planning of Somaliland
- In office June 2022 – November 2023
- President: Muse Bihi Abdi
- Preceded by: Omar Ali Abdillahi
- Succeeded by: Ahmed Mohamed Diriye

Minister of Education
- In office November 2023 – December 2024
- President: Muse Bihi Abdi
- Preceded by: Ahmed Mohamed Diriye
- Succeeded by: Ismail Yusuf Duale Guuleed

Personal details
- Occupation: Politician
- Nickname: Buuxane

Ahmed Adan Ahmed (Ahmed Aden Ahmed, Somali: Axmed Aden Buuxane), commonly known as Buhane, is a Somaliland politician who served as the country's Minister of Planning and the Minister of Education.

== Biography ==
Ahmed Aden Buhane is from the Awdal region. He belongs to the Mahamed Ase sub-clan of the Samaroon clan. Before entering politics, he is one of the most renowned doctors in Somaliland. He was stationed in the Borama District, the capital of Awdal region.

In February 2013, a Somaliland website conducted a public survey to select 100 individuals who contributed to Somaliland; Ahmed Aden Buhane was chosen as one of the three individuals in the health sector.

=== Drought response committee ===
In April 2016, Buhane served as a member of the Awdal region's drought response committee during a severe drought in Somaliland. He highlighted the critical condition of agro-pastoralists who had lost their livestock and depleted their food stores after consecutive rainy seasons failed to provide necessary water and pasture.

In April 2017, President Silanyo appointed a national committee for the 18 May National Day, designating the occasion as a day in support of people affected by drought; Buhane was selected as a member of this committee.

In November 2017, Buhane served as a member of the Somaliland Drought Recovery Committee. He was appointed as one of four authorized signatories for the committee's bank account, a role established to maintain transparency in the handling of public donations and to safeguard against the misappropriation of funds.

In November 2019, Ahmed Aden Buhane was appointed to a national fund-raising committee established by President Muse Bihi Abdi. He served as one of twelve members tasked with coordinating humanitarian relief and mobilizing resources to support the residents of Beledweyne, who were severely affected by devastating riverine floods.

In May 2020, during the COVID-19 pandemic, Buhane, as a member of the Somaliland COVID-19 Advisory Committee, published a detailed advisory regarding public safety. He used historical examples to emphasize the danger of mass gatherings and cautioned that the regional health system lacked sufficient infrastructure, specifically oxygen and ventilators.

In June 2020, Buhane issued a public health warning regarding the use of dexamethasone for COVID-19 treatment. He clarified that while the steroid could benefit severely ill patients requiring oxygen or ventilators, it was not a general cure and cautioned against self-medication due to potential health risks.

=== Minister of Planning ===
Baki and Borama

In June 2022, Buhane was appointed as the Minister of Planning following a cabinet reshuffle.

In August 2022, Buhane, the Minister of Planning and National Development, addressed a controversial mistranslation of a British media report regarding the drought's impact in the Horn of Africa. He clarified that the original article discussed regional challenges and had been misrepresented on social media to falsely disparage Somaliland women.

In December 2022, Buhane officiated the groundbreaking ceremony for a 33-kilometer road linking Borama and Baki in the Awdal region. Funded by the African Development Bank, the project was implemented through a partnership between Save the Children and the Somaliland Roads Authority.

=== Minister of Education ===
In November 2023, Buhane was appointed as the Minister of Education.

In December 2023, Buhane visited Djibouti as part of the official delegation accompanying President Muse Bihi Abdi for a working visit to participate in diplomatic talks between Somaliland and Somalia.

In September 2024, Buhane formally granted official recognition to the Somaliland Teachers’ Association (SOLTA). This approval empowered the association to represent primary and secondary school teachers nationwide, aiming to strengthen advocacy for educators' rights and professional development within the country.

In October 2024, Buhane attended the inauguration of the renovated Hargeisa Technical Institute. He emphasized a strategic shift in Somaliland's educational policy toward technical and vocational training, aiming to provide the youth with essential skills and increase national employment opportunities.

In December 2024, Buhane concluded his tenure as the Minister of Education and Science. He officially transferred the leadership of the ministry to the incoming minister, Ismail Yusuf Duale, during a formal handover ceremony attended by government officials and international partners at the ministry's headquarters in Hargeisa.
