= Eelo University =

Private university in Borama, Somaliland

- Jaamacadda Eelo
- Type: Private
- Established: 2007
- President: Dr. Mohamud Hussein Egeh
- Students: 6,000 (2016/2017)
- Location: Borama, Awdal, Somaliland
- Campus: Main Campus located Borama Downtown.
- Sporting affiliations: Football.
- Website: Eelo University

Eelo University (Somali: Jaamacada Eelo), often abbreviated EU, is a comprehensive, private university located in the city of Borama in the northwestern of Somaliland.

Eelo University was legally mandated by the Ministry of Education in the year 2007 to address pertinent issues affecting the adjacent communities in the Horn of Africa. The University is located in western Somaliland. It lies between the 08°00′ – 11°30′ parallel north of the equator and between 42°30′ – 49°00′ meridian east of Greenwich. It is bordered by Djibouti to the west, Ethiopia to the south, and Somalia to the east.
