= Husein Farah Dodi =

- Xuseen Faarax Doodi

Minister of Finance of Somaliland
- In office 2001 – June 2003
- Preceded by: Mohamed Said Gees
- Succeeded by: Hussein Ali Duale

Personal details
- Died: August 4, 2019 Hargeisa, Somaliland
- Occupation: Civil servant, politician

Husein Farah Dodi (Somali: Xuseen Faarax Doodi) was a Somaliland civil servant and politician who served as Somaliland's minister of finance, handing over the post in June 2003. He died in Hargeisa on 4 August 2019.

== Biography ==
=== Senior official at the Ministry of Finance ===
In an anecdote from Mohamed Haji Ibrahim Egal’s presidency, then Finance Minister Mohamed Said Gees recalled that President Egal pressed him to dismiss his relative Weli Haji Daauud Egal from the Ministry of Finance with immediate effect; Gees refused, arguing that Weli was a duly appointed civil servant who had passed a formal recruitment exam and could only be removed by a presidential decree, and he later quipped to his subordinate Hussein Farah Dodi that “the old man” still seemed preoccupied with the Weli matter.

On 31 May 2001, a national referendum on the adoption of the Somaliland Constitution was held. In order to verify whether the vote had also taken place effectively in the eastern regions, international observers dispatched a delegation to the eastern town of Erigavo. After that, the head of that delegation, Professor Iqbaal, then South Africa's representative to Somaliland, departed from Erigavo airport, where Husein Farah Dodi was among senior government officials who saw him off.

=== Finance Minister ===
In February 2003, the 2003 national budget was submitted about three months late and approved by the Council of Ministers. During the process, serious questions were raised over the execution and final accounts of the 2002 budget, particularly concerning the lack of transparency over the use of approximately 26.45 billion Somaliland shillings out of total revenues of about 106.7 billion shillings. Finance Minister Husein Farah Dodi explained that the delay was unavoidable due to the livestock export crisis and the closure of the Ethiopian border.

In March 2003, Somaliland’s minister of finance, Husein Farah Dodi, briefed the House of Representatives on the proposed 2003 budget. During the briefing, it emerged that there were major numerical discrepancies between the budget submitted to the cabinet, totaling about 96.85 billion Somaliland shillings, and the version presented to parliament, totaling about 101.69 billion shillings, raising serious questions about the credibility of the budget.

In June 2003, Husein Farah Dodi handed over his duties to the newly appointed Minister of Finance, Hussein Ali Duale. Reflecting on his term in office, Dodi pointed out that large volumes of goods, including vehicles, were entering Somaliland illegally from the eastern border areas of the Sool and Sanaag regions, undermining tax revenues and weakening the economy. He argued that the situation on the ground was not fully understood in the capital, Hargeisa, and that the government’s response had been inadequate. Dodi also expressed his gratitude to the staff of the Ministry of Finance for their cooperation during his tenure and urged them to extend the same support to the new minister.

=== Death ===
On 4 August 2019, Husein Farah Dodi died in Hargeisa. Somaliland President Muse Bihi Abdi expressed his condolences following his death.
