= Ahmed Hassan Caafi =

Somaliland politician, government minister and academic

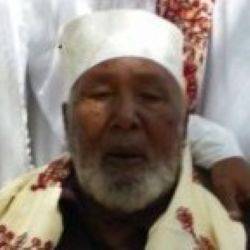

Minister of Planning
- In office March 2002 – November 2002
- President: Mohamed Haji Ibrahim Egal
- Succeeded by: Ahmed Haji Dahir Ilmi

Minister of Justice
- In office 2001 – March 2002
- President: Mohamed Haji Ibrahim Egal
- Succeeded by: Abdihamid Garad Jama

Director General, Ministry of Finance
- In office 1992–1993

Personal details
- Died: 24 June 2021 Hargeisa, Somaliland
- Occupation: Politician, academic, engineer

Ahmed Hassan Caafi (Somali: Axmed Xasan Caafi) was a Somaliland politician, former government minister, engineer, and senior lecturer. Over the course of the 1990s and early 2000s, he held several senior positions, including Director General of the Ministry of Finance, Minister of Justice, and Minister of Planning under President Mohamed Haji Ibrahim Egal. He later taught at the University of Hargeisa and remained influential in the Kulmiye political party until he died in 2021.

== Biography ==
He hails from the Samaroon/Ciise clan.

=== General director of Finance ===
From 1992 to 1993, Ahmed Hassan Caafi served as Director General of the Ministry of Finance.

=== Justice Minister ===
The HAVAYOCO youth organization, a charity based in Hargeisa, celebrated its tenth anniversary, with Justice Minister Ahmed Hassan Caafi in attendance as the commemorative event.

=== Planning Minister ===
In March 2002, President Mohamed Ibrahim Egal reshuffled his cabinet, replacing Justice Minister Ahmed Hassan Caafi with Abdihamid Garad Jama and appointing Ahmad Hasan Aafi as Minister of Planning.

In October 2002, a workshop on workers' rights organised by the International Labour Organization (ILO) was held at the Maansoor Hotel in Hargeisa, where Planning Minister Ahmed Hassan Caafi also spoke, stressing that it was important to have laws guaranteeing workers' rights.

During his time as a minister, President Mohamed Ibrahim Egal reportedly referred to Ahmed Hassan Caafi, Mohamed Siciid Gees and Yusuf Aynab Muse as "the three well-meaning fools", a paradoxical nickname that stemmed from their habit of walking to their ministries rather than using government vehicles, implying that their naïve integrity could help the government make genuine progress.

In November 2002, President Dahir Rayale Kahin dismissed Planning Minister Ahmed Hassan Caafi and appointed Ahmed Haji Dahir Ilmi in his place.

=== University of Hargeisa ===
As of November 2013, Ahmed Hassan Caafi was serving as a senior lecturer at the University of Hargeisa.

In June 2017, the vice president of Somaliland, accompanied by the minister of parliamentary relations and research, the minister of state for planning, the deputy minister of information, presidential advisers and the vice president's special secretary, visited senior Kulmiye Party figure Ahmed Hassan Caafi at his home while he was receiving medical treatment.

=== Death ===
On June 24, 2021, Ahmed Hassan Caafi died in Hargeisa.
