= Abdiweli Sheikh Abdillahi =

Somali politician

Abdiweli Sheikh Abdillahi عبدولي شيخ عبد الله
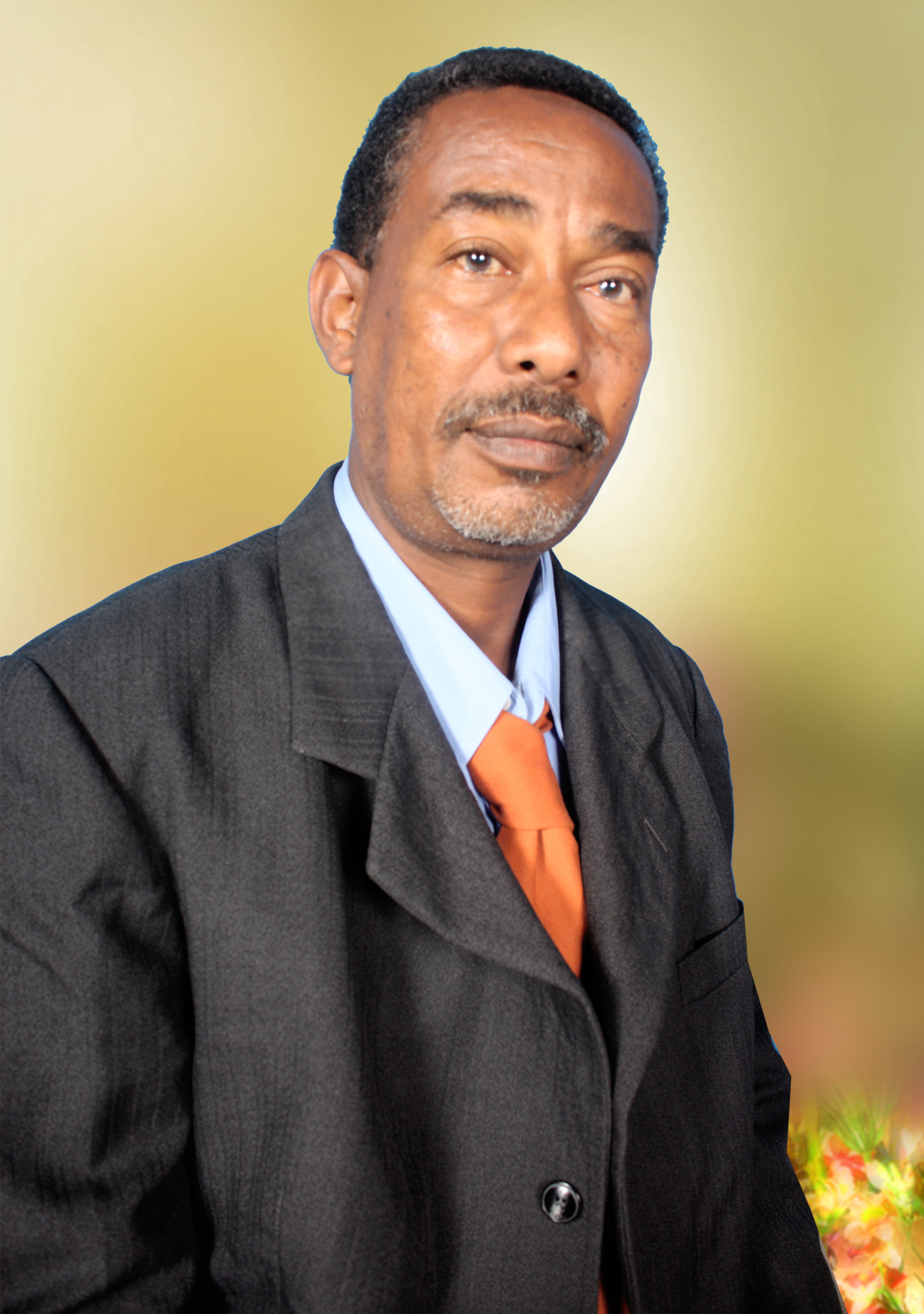

Minister of Information & Communication Technology
- Incumbent
- Assumed office 14 December 2017
- President: Muse Bihi Abdi
- Preceded by: Mustafe Farah Abrar

Personal details
- Party: Peace, Unity, and Development Party

Abdiweli Sheikh Abdillahi Soufi (Somali: Cabdiweli Shiikh Cabdillaahi Suufi) is a Somaliland politician, who is currently serving as the Minister of Information & Communication Technology of Somaliland.

== See also ==
- Ministry of Telecommunications and Technology (Somaliland)
- Politics of Somaliland
- List of Somaliland politicians

Political offices
Preceded by Mustafe Farah Abrar	Minister of Telecommunications and Technology; 2017–present	Incumbent
