= Muse Rabile Ghod =

Somali military leader

Colonel Muse Rabile Ghod Muuse Rabiile Good موسي ربيل جود

Minister of Land & Air Transportation
- In office 1989–1990

Minister of Public Works and Housing
- In office 1987–1989

Minister of Livestock, Animal Husbandry, Forestry and Range
- In office 1985–1987

Minister of Commerce or Trade
- In office 1984–1985

Minister of Health
- In office 1976–1980

Minister of Transport
- In office 1973–1974

Minister of Labour & Sports
- In office 1971–1973

Member of the Somali Revolutionary Socialist Party

Member of the Supreme Revolutionary Council

Personal details
- Born: Borama, Awdal, Somaliland
- Relatives: Djama Rabile Ghod
- Profession: Colonel and Politician or Minister

Muse Rabile Ghod or Muse Rabile Got (Somali: Muuse Rabiile Good, Arabic: موسي ربيل جود) also known as or Col. Muse Rabile Goad; was a Somali military leader, colonel, minister and politician of the former Somali Democratic Republic.

== History ==
Muse born in Borama, Awdal, Somaliland and belongs to the Bahabr Muse (Bahabar Muuse), Mahamed 'Ase (Maxamed Case) section of the Gadabursi (Gadabuursi) or Samaron (Samaroon) clan. In his life he managed to become member of the Supreme Revolutionary Council (Somalia) and Somali Revolutionary Socialist Party, a Military Leader. He worked at many ministries during his life as a politician, he served his country as Minister of Labour & Sport, Minister of Transport, Minister of Health, Minister of Commerce or Trade, Minister of Livestock, Animal Husbandry, Forestry and Range, Minister of Public Works and Housing, Minister of Land & Air Transportation.

=== Minister of Health ===
As a Minister of Healthy he contributed to the eradication of smallpox in Somalia. A paper published by the World Health Organization was released in August 1979 declaring the eradication of smallpox (Ciribtirka Furuqa) in Somalia signed and stamped by the Ministry of Health.

Below is a quote by the World Health Organization (WHO) acknowledging Muse Rabile God contribution to the eradication of smallpox in Somalia and consequently in the world.

Colonel Musa Rabile God, Minister of Health was committed to the idea of smallpox eradication from the outset of the programme and was unfailing in his support and encouragement. In this he was fully supported by the Director-General of Health Services, Mr Musa Gure Mohamed, who in addition to his enthusiastic assistance removed many administrative obstacles which might otherwise have obstructed the success of the programme. We acknowledge the support received from the Central Committee as well as the Committee for Social Affairs of the SRSP and the Ministeries of Local Government and Rural Development, Defence, Education, Livestock, Information and Public Guidance.

— Ministry of Health, Somalia & World Health Organization, WHO, Smallpox Eradication in Somalia, 1979

A gallery below of the contribution to the eradication of smallpox in Somalia and images of Muse Rabile God.

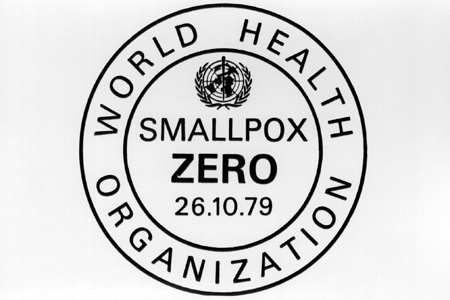
The logo certifying the eradication of smallpox in Somalia, and consequently, in the world, 1979.

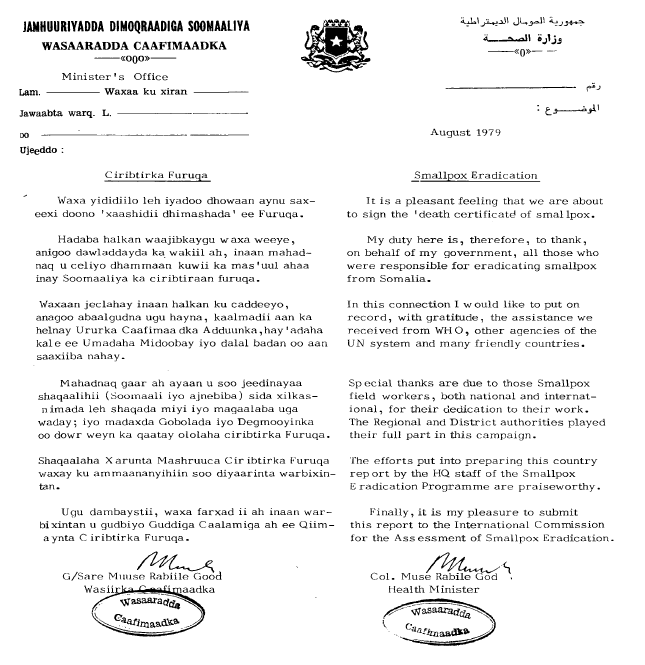
Muse Rabile Ghod in a press release declaring the end of smallpox in Somalia and thanking everyone involved including the WHO and submitting the report to the International Commission for the Assessment of Smallpox Eradication.

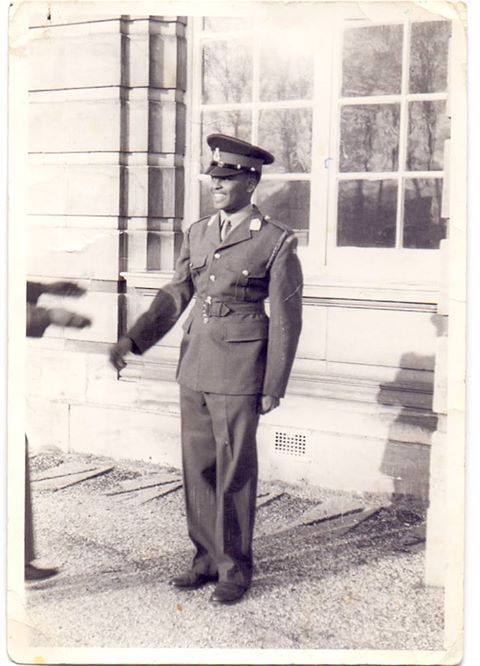
Muse Rabile Ghod himself in his early years.

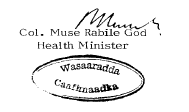
Muse Rabile Ghod Signature and Stamp in English

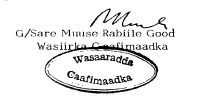
Muse Rabile Ghod Signature and Stamp in Somali

=== Career ===
- Part of Supreme Revolutionary Council (Somalia)
- Part of Somali Revolutionary Socialist Party
- Minister of Labour & Sports (1971–1973)
- Minister of Transport (1973–1974)
- Minister of Health (1976–1980)
- Minister of Commerce or Trade (1984–1985)
- Minister of Livestock, Animal Husbandry, Forestry and Range (1985–1987)
- Minister of Public Works and Housing (1987–1989)
- Minister of Land & Air Transportation (1989–1990)

=== Publications ===
"The Hunters of Somalia," World Health, October 1979, Muse Rabile Goad
