= Yasin Haji Mohamoud =

Somaliland Politician and Diplomat

- ياسين حاجي محمود
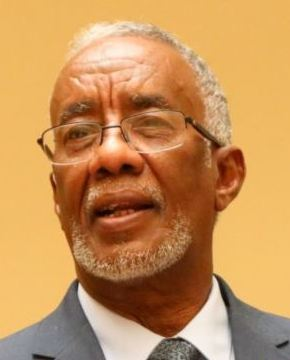
- Mohamoud in 2019

7th Speaker of the Somaliland House of Representatives
- Incumbent
- Assumed office 23 July 2023
- President: Muse Bihi Abdi; Abdirahman Mohamed Abdullahi
- Preceded by: Abdirisak Khalif

Minister of Foreign Affairs
- In office 10 November 2018 – 3 March 2021
- President: Muse Bihi Abdi
- Preceded by: Dr. Saad Ali Shire
- Succeeded by: Essa Kayd

Minister of Education and Science
- In office 14 December 2017 – 10 November 2018
- President: Muse Bihi Abdi
- Preceded by: Abdillahi Ibrahim Habane
- Succeeded by: Osman Adan Jama

Minister of Interior
- In office 15 August 2016 – 14 December 2017
- President: Ahmed Mohamed Mohamoud
- Preceded by: Ali Mohamed Warancadde
- Succeeded by: Mohamed Kahin Ahmed

Personal details
- Born: 1947 (age 78–79) Las Anod, British Somaliland (now Somaliland)
- Citizenship: Somalilander
- Party: Peace, Unity, and Development Party

Yasin Haji Mohamoud Hiir (Somali: Yaasiin Xaaji Maxamuud Xiir) also known as Faratoon (Faraton) is a Somalilander politician, who is currently the speaker of Somaliland's Lower House of Parliament (House of Representatives).

Prior to his election as a member of Somaliland's House of Representatives in May 2021, Faratoon served as the Foreign Minister of Somaliland. He formerly served as the Education and Science Minister of Somaliland. He also served as the Minister of Interior of Somaliland.

== Biography ==
Faratoon was born in Las Anod in 1947. He finished his primary education in the city and attended Dayaha High School in Erigavo. He studied Social Welfare at Lafoole University, and later became a faculty member there.

He later worked for the Ministry of Education of Somalia, rising to the position of Director General. In 1980, he defected to Qatar after being accused of coup d'état.

=== After the Declaration of Independence of Somaliland ===
When Somaliland declared independence in 1991, he became the first governor of the Sool region. In 1993, President Egal appointed Faratoon as Minister of Health and Labor.

In 1997, he became a member of the Somaliland House of Representatives and was one of the members who drafted the Constitution of Somaliland.

In 2002, when Daahir Rayaale became president, Faratoon became the Minister of Third Country Resettlement. In 2003, he visited Yagori with the Somaliland Force.

In 2003, he moved out of the country and returned in 2016.

=== Minister of Interior ===
In August 2016, President Silanyo appointed Faratoon as Minister of Interior, the first politician from Sool.

In November, Faratoon met with Steven Lauwerier of UNICEF Africa in Nairobi, Kenya.

=== Minister of Education and Science ===
When Muse Bihi Abdi became president in 2017, Faratoon was appointed Minister of Education and Science.

=== Minister of Foreign Affairs ===
In November 2018, Faratoon was appointed Minister of Foreign Affairs.

In February 2020, Faratoon met with Taiwan's Foreign Minister in Taipei.

In June 2020, he will accompany President Muse Bihi Abdi to Djibouti.

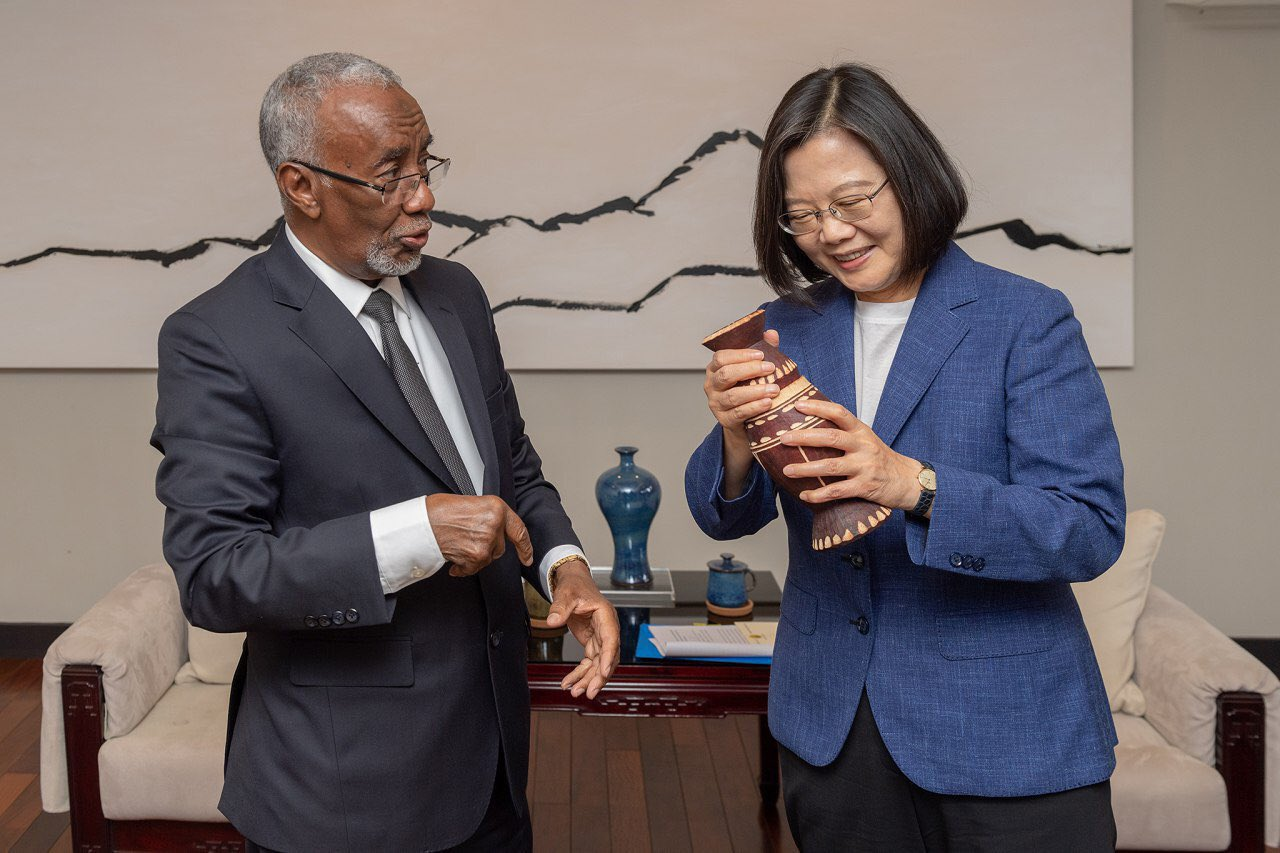
Somaliland Foreign Minister Hagi Mohamoud with Taiwan President Tsai Ing-wen

On 1 July 2020, Faratoon signed a new agreement with the Taiwanese government. Faratoon stated on Twitter, "opening missions to boost political and socioeconomic links between the Republic of Somaliland and the Republic of China." Despite protests from the Somalia and Chinese governments over the diplomatic relations between Somaliland and Taiwan, Falatoon announced that Somaliland can establish relations and agreements with any country.

On 29 July 2020, he visited Turkey as Minister of Foreign Affairs.

On 17 August 2020, Faratoon announced that Taiwan will officially open a representative office in Somaliland. On September 9, 2020, the Somaliland office was opened in Taipei.

=== Somaliland House of Representatives ===
On 3 March 2021, Faratoon announced his resignation as Minister of Foreign Affairs. The reason was to run for the Somaliland parliamentary seat. In June 2021, he ran for and won a seat in the Somaliland House of Representatives from the Kulmiye party. In August 2021, he was unsuccessful in the election for the Speaker of the Somaliland Parliament. Abdirisak Khalif was elected.

=== Speaker of the House of Representatives of Somaliland ===
In June 2023, Abdirisak Khalif resigned because of the war with Las Anod by Somaliland forces. On 23 July 2023, Faratoon was elected Speaker of the House of Representatives of Somaliland with 46 votes out of 81 who participated in the voting. Faratoon issued a statement that he will resolve the dispute in Las Anod. On 2 August, he officially assumed the position of chairperson.

== See also ==
- Ministry of Interior (Somaliland)
- Ministry of Foreign Affairs (Somaliland)
- Ministry of Education (Somaliland)
- List of Somalis

Political offices
Preceded by Ali Mohamed Warancadde	Minister of Interior; 2016–2017	Succeeded by Mohamed Kahin Ahmed
Preceded by Abdillahi Ibrahim Habane	Minister of Education; 2017–2018	Succeeded by Osman Adan Jama
Preceded by Dr. Saad Ali Shire	Foreign Minister; 2018–2021	Succeeded by Liban Yusuf Osman (Acting)
Preceded by Abdirisak Khalif	Speaker of House of Representatives of Somaliland; 2023–present	Incumbent
