= Hassan Haji Mohamoud =

Somali politician

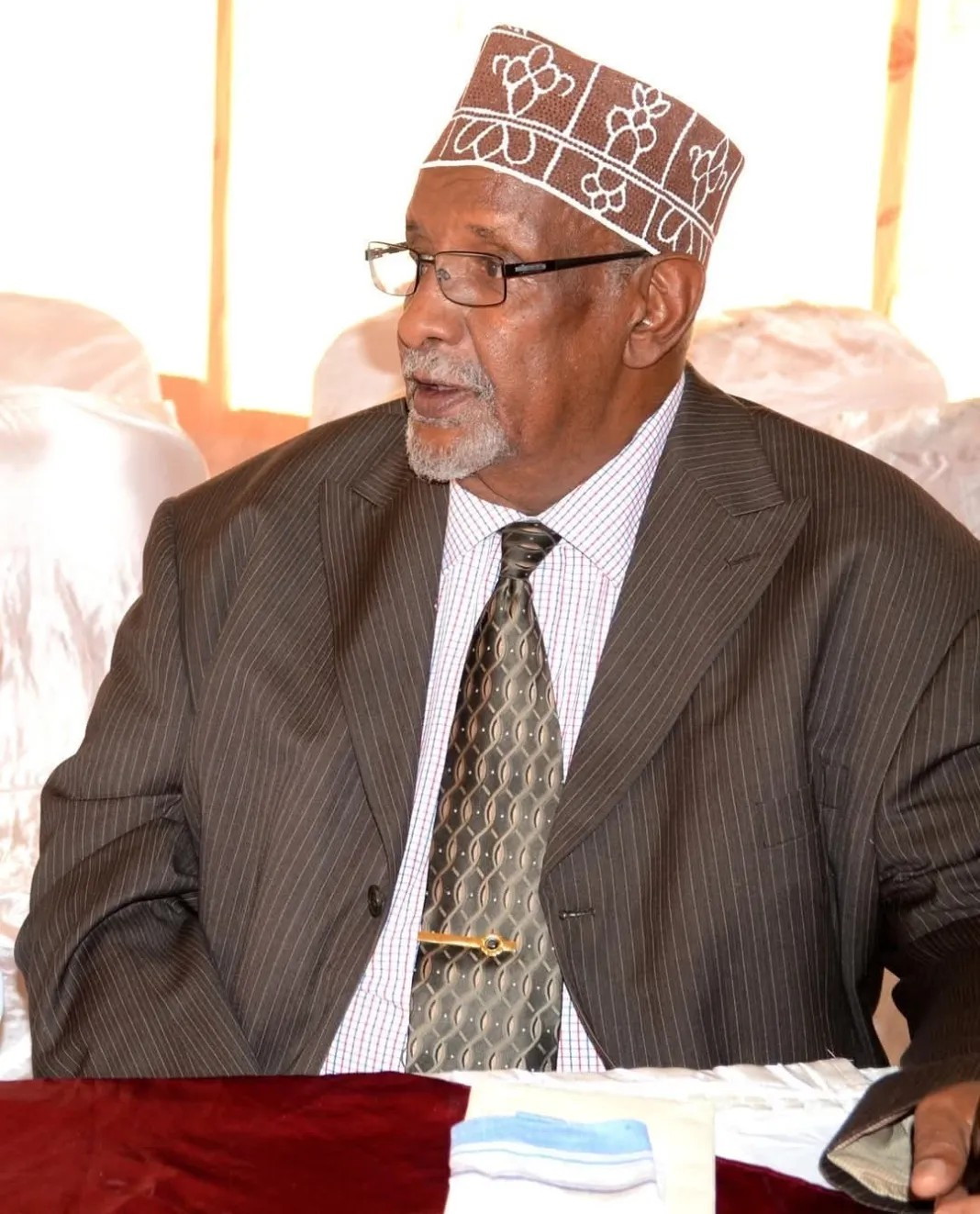

Minister of Education
- In office July 5, 2003 – July 27, 2010
- Preceded by: Abdi Awaadle
- Succeeded by: Zamzam Abdi Adan

Governor of Sahil
- In office 1998–2003

Mayor of Berbera
- In office 1998–2003

Personal details
- Born: 1944 Sheikh, Somaliland
- Died: 3 October 2021 (aged 76–77)
- Citizenship: Somalilander
- Party: UDUB; Kulmiye
- Occupation: Minister, Governor, Mayor, Member of Parliament, Civil Servant

Hassan Haji Mohamoud (Somali: Xasan Xaaji Maxamuud Warsame), also known as Hassan Gadhweyneh, is a Somali politician, the longest serving Minister of Education of Somaliland (2003-2010), the Mayor of Berbera (1998-2003), Governor of Sahil region of Somaliland from (1998-2003). He also served as the Deputy-Mayor of Mogadishu from (1975-1991).

== Biography ==
Hassan Gadhweyne was born in 1944 in the Sheikh District in British Somaliland. He completed his primary and intermediate education in the same district. In the early 1960s, at the age of 21, he entered local government service and was appointed secretary of the local administration of Oodweyne District.

In 1972, Hassan Gadhweyne was appointed secretary of the newly established Galgaduud region, and in 1973 he became the deputy governor of that region; in 1974 he was promoted to serve as the Deputy Mayor of Banadir, the capital of Somalia, a position he held until the escalation of the Somali civil war.

=== Mayor of Berbera ===
Hassan Gadhweyne served as Mayor of Berbera and Governor of the Sahil region in 1988; following Somaliland’s 2002 local council elections, he was elected as a member of the Berbera municipal council and continued to serve as mayor until 2003.

=== Education Minister ===
In 2003, Hassan Gadhweyne was appointed Minister of Education by President Egal.

In May 2006, in Erigavo city in the Sanaag region of northern Somaliland, public demonstrations erupted in protest against a municipal council decision to raise the price of drinking water, with some protests escalating into unrest; following visits and mediation by Hassan Gadhweyneh and other officials, the city council decided to postpone the planned price increase.

In November 2007, Hassan Gadhweyne banned the establishment of new private universities in Somaliland, citing the rapid proliferation of private institutions; while commending those proposing new universities as patriotic, he encouraged them instead to invest in much-needed technical and vocational schools.

In June 2009, President Dahir Riyale Kahin signed an agreement with a Kuwaiti businessman concerning the Berbera cement factory, after which he promptly traveled to Kuwait accompanied by Education Minister Hassan Gadhweyne, who was described as having strong personal connections in Kuwait from earlier visits; however, contemporary media criticized the fact that Gadhweyne handled the matter—rather than the minister responsible for industry or the parliament—arguing that the arrangement violated constitutional principles of free competition and national priority.

During his tenure, Hassan Gadhweyneh read a monthly student magazine published by Faarax Oomaar High School that contained an awareness article discussing HIV/AIDS and condom use; considering parts of it inappropriate, he marked those sections in red pen and summoned the student authors for a stern reprimand, advising them that in an Islamic society the values to be conveyed should emphasize chastity and moral conduct, and that content which might undermine cultural or ethical norms should not be published.

An article recalled an incident from Hassan Gadhweyne’s time as a minister, when—after attending a ceremony—students at the Mujahid Quule Adan school petitioned him not to remove their headmaster and physically blocked the minister’s car; although media were present at the scene, the journalist-author said he chose not to broadcast the footage, explaining that the press should not place children at the forefront of political agitation or inflame unrest.

On 27 July 2010, new President Silanyo appointed Zamzam Abdi Adan as Minister of Education. In August 2010, ministerial handover ceremonies were conducted across Somaliland.

=== Former Education Minister ===
In February 2014, some online media reported that Hassan Gadhweyne had assaulted and insulted a woman in Berbera; he categorically denied any use of violence, but acknowledged that—after repeated verbal provocations directed at him in public places and hotels, including on the day in question at a hotel in Berbera—he became emotional and uttered inappropriate remarks. He later said he learned that the woman was a relative (his niece) and stressed that insulting women contradicts his cultural and religious values, issuing a formal public apology and seeking forgiveness.

In December 2017, former Somaliland Minister of Education Abdillahi Ibrahim Habane (Abdillahi Dheere) denied media claims that a Ministry of Education vehicle had been stolen, saying the car was originally left from Hassan Gadhweyne’s tenure and had been handed down from one education minister to the next; he added that he had temporarily entrusted it to a poor teacher with a sick child so the teacher could use it for transport, while the vehicle remained registered in the ministry’s records.

In September 2020, Sultan Osman Sultan Haji Ali Kooshin, the Sultan of the Issa Musa clan, died, and Hassan Gadhweyne served as one of the members of the funeral-organizing committee.

=== Death ===
Hassan Gadhweyne died on 3 October 2021 in Hargeisa, and his state funeral—attended by Somaliland President Muse Bihi Abdi along with many prominent figures—was held in Hargeisa.

Preceded by Abdi Awaadle	Education Minister of Somaliland; 2003-2010	Succeeded by Zamzam Abdi Adan
