= Mohamed Yonis =

Somaliland-Canadian diplomat

Mohamed Yonis محمد يونس
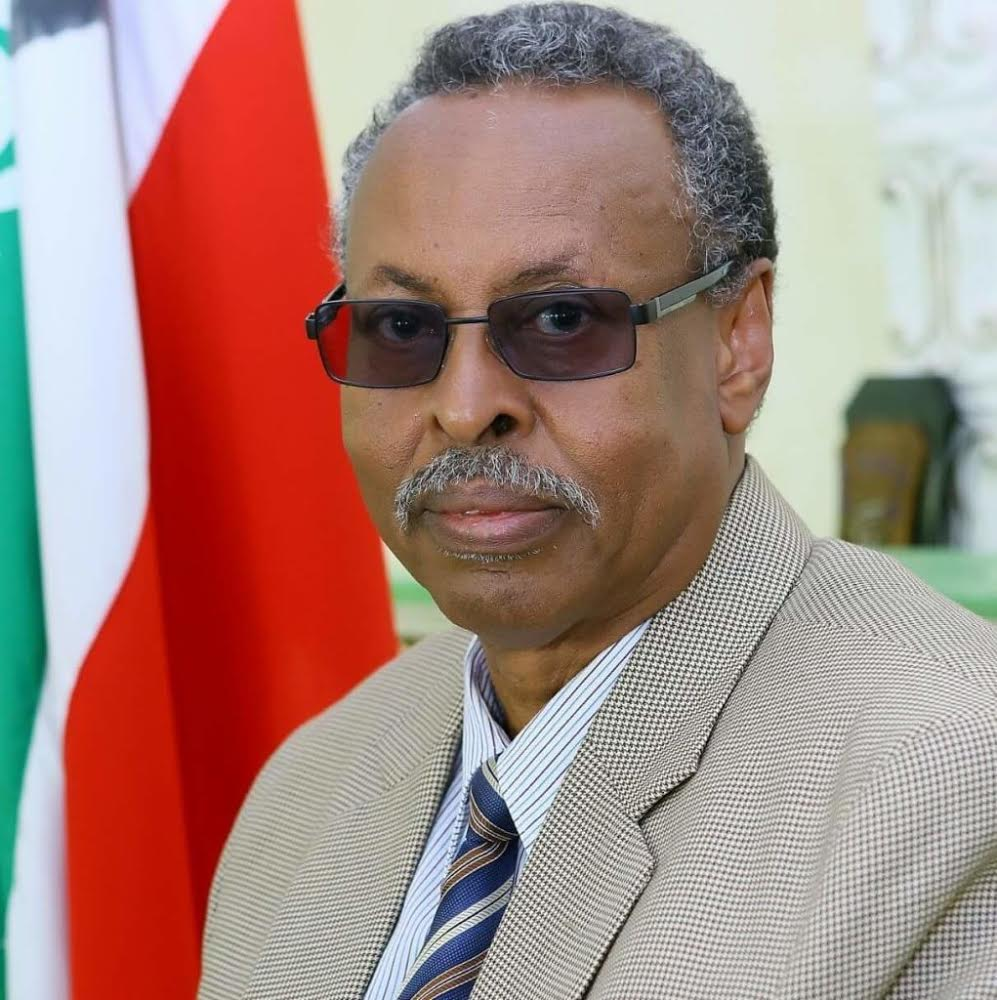

11th Minister of Foreign Affairs
- In office June 25, 2013 – October 26, 2015
- President: Ahmed Mohamed Mohamoud
- Preceded by: Mohammad Abdullahi Omar
- Succeeded by: Dr. Saad Ali Shire

Personal details
- Spouse: Halima Mumin
- Education: Harvard Kennedy School; Miami University

Mohamed Behi Yonis (Arabic: محمد يونس) is a Somaliland-Canadian diplomat who was the Minister of Foreign Affairs of Somaliland for two years. He worked for both African Union and the United Nations.

== Career ==
=== Early career ===
Before becoming the Minister of Foreign Affairs, Yonis worked in a peacekeeping capacity in senior-level field assignments. These include serving as the Chief Administrative Officer with the United Nations Truce Supervision Organization (UNTSO) from 2002 to 2006 and as the Chief Administrative Officer in the Office of the United Nations Special Coordinator for the Middle East Peace Process (UNSCO) from 2001 to 2002. Prior to service in peacekeeping, he worked for the African Development Bank in Côte d'Ivoire in various senior positions, including as the Director and Management Adviser to the President of the Bank, and the Deputy Director of Human Resources Management.

In a professional capacity, he worked as the Deputy Joint Special Representative for Operations and Management in the African Union–United Nations Hybrid Operation in Darfur (UNAMID). He also served as the Director of Mission Support in UNAMID, where he contributed to addressing the mission's operational, administrative, and logistical support challenges. Yonis' work with these operations began at the initial planning stages in 2006, when he served as the Head of the Darfur Planning Team in New York and later as the Mission Support Adviser to the African Union Mission in Sudan (AMIS).

=== Minister of Foreign Affairs ===
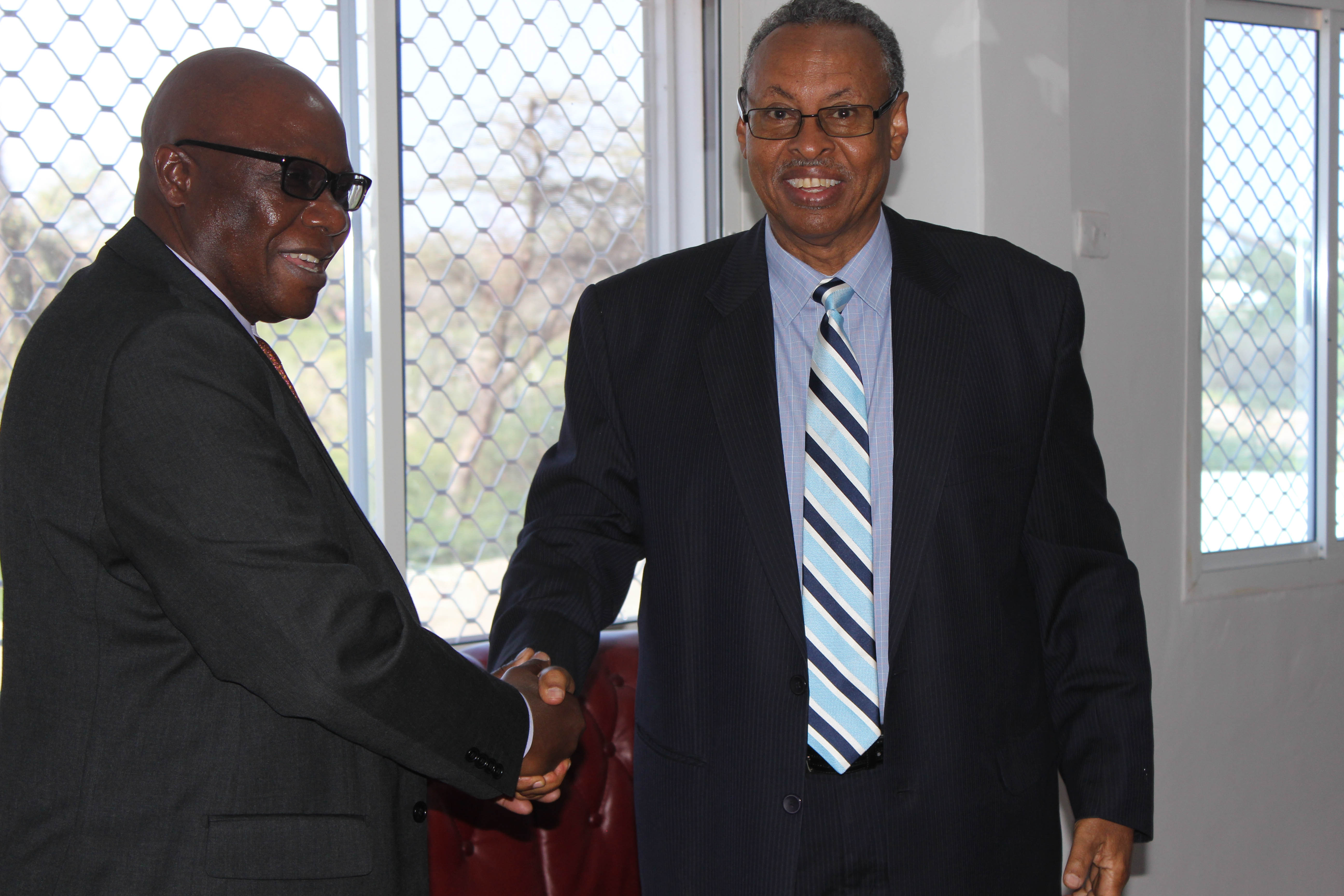
The Deputy Special Representative of the United Nations Secretary-General for Somalia (DSRSG) Raisedon Zenenga meets the Somaliland Minister of Foreign Affairs Mohamed Yonis in Hargeisa, Somaliland on September 8, 2015. Zenenga was on a two-day working visit to Somaliland aimed to strengthen relations between the United Nations and the government of Somaliland.

Somaliland President Ahmed Mohamed Mohamoud picked Yonis to become Somaliland’s Minister of Foreign Affairs on 25 June 2013. He replaced Mohamed Abdullahi Omar following a cabinet reshuffle.

Yonis attended Somaliland’s first investment conference, co-hosted by the UK Government and held in London in 2014, which showcased Somaliland's investment potential to European investors.

He orchestrated the first visit by a large ministerial delegation from Ethiopia, including the Minister of Finance and Economic Development and the Minister of Transport, to Somaliland in November 2014 and the Ministry of Foreign Affairs under his leadership facilitated Somaliland's participation in the first International Trade Fair held in Addis Ababa. Yonis was at the forefront of trade negotiations with Ethiopia, including for the development and use of Berbera Port; the reduction of trade barriers for Somaliland's private sector to enter the Ethiopian market; and securing cheaper electricity into Somaliland. The Ministry also secured more scholarships for Somaliland students provided by Ethiopia.

In 2015, Yonis led a high-level delegation comprising the Minister of National Planning and Development, Dr. Sa’ad A. Shire, and former Foreign Minister, Dr. Edna Adan, to Brussels for the first Somaliland Recognition Conference at the European Parliament in January 2015. Yonis and the delegation met senior members of the European Parliament, officials from the Belgian Ministry of Foreign Affairs, and European media outlets to present Somaliland's achievements and a case for international recognition.

Yonis attended the African Development Bank's Annual Meeting in May 2015, which was celebrating the Bank's 50th anniversary and hosting the election for the new President of the Bank. This was the first time Somaliland was represented at the African Development Bank. He met a number of high-level officials, including heads of state, during his trip to Abidjan, Ivory Coast. He also secured several million dollars' worth of funding from the Bank for water projects for Somaliland, with potential support for energy and infrastructure. In an attempt to address the impact of the large number of refugees traveling to Somaliland to escape the civil war in Yemen, he met senior officials at the United Nations High Commissioner for Refugees (UNHCR) in Geneva, Switzerland, to discuss the Yemen refugee crisis and its impact on Somaliland.

During Yonis' tenure, Somaliland also saw improvement in international relations. In June 2015, he took part in the 25th World Economic Forum on Africa in Cape Town, South Africa, where he represented Somaliland and led a discussion on Africa's security landscape.

Yonis redeveloped the Ministry's human resources, infrastructure, policies and procedures, and communication, and established many services to citizens including visas, entry permits, and business certificates. He restructured the Ministry to better fulfill its mandate, including recruiting experienced Somalilanders to work as advisors in the legal, communication, political affairs, and international cooperation fields.

He used this international platform to discuss the many obstacles facing Somaliland at the time, including low employment rates amongst the youth, inequality, and potential avenues to tackle these issues through fairer policies and encouragement of foreign investment. Yonis showcased Somaliland to world leaders and presented the nation's achievements, including the peace and stability enjoyed in Somaliland and its economic development potential, to new investors.

He strengthened relations with many countries through formal and informal meetings with senior government officials from Kenya, Ethiopia, Turkey, Egypt, the United Arab Emirates, Norway, Belgium, Ireland, the U.K., and many more. He continued to raise Somaliland's profile and achievements through interviews with leading media outlets including CNBC Africa, NRK Norway, Sky News, CNN, KTN Kenya, and The Guardian. Yonis' other achievements include drafting Somaliland’s first Foreign Policy and Recognition Seeking Strategy presented to the Presidency.

Yonis resigned his position, along with eleven other government officials, in 2015 when President Silanyo unilaterally selected Muse Bihi Abdi, his party chairman, to succeed him as the parties presidential candidate in the upcoming election.

== Personal life ==
He holds a Bachelor's Degree in Political Science from Miami University and an MPA in Public Administration from Harvard University.
