= Ahmed Osman Hassan =

Somali politician

Ahmed Osman Hassan احمد عثمان حسن
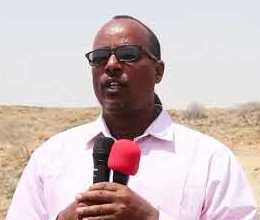

Governor of Sahil
- Incumbent
- Assumed office 10 April 2018
- President: Muse Bihi Abdi
- Preceded by: Jama Yusuf Ahmed

Ahmed Osman Hassan (Somali: Axmed Cismaan Xasan) is a Somali politician, who is currently serving as the Governor of Sahil region of Somaliland since April 2018.

== See also ==
- Berbera
- Sahil Region
- Governor of Sahil

Political offices
Preceded by Jama Yusuf Ahmed	Governor of Sahil; 2018-present	Incumbent
