= Zamzam Abdi Adan =

Somali politician

- زمزم عبدي آدم
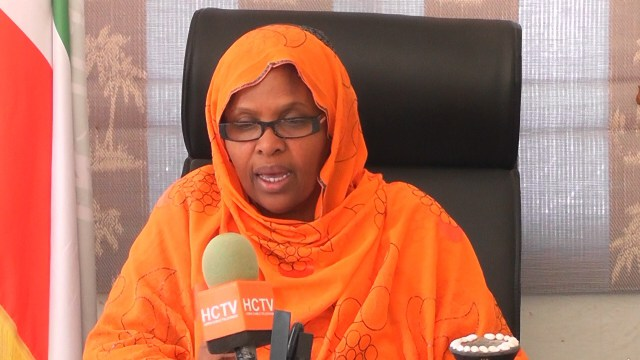

15th Minister of Finance
- In office 28 February 2015 – 14 December 2017
- President: Ahmed Mohamed Mohamoud
- Preceded by: Abdiaziz Mohamed Samale
- Succeeded by: Yusuf Mohamed Abdi

Minister of Education and Science
- In office 27 July 2010 – 28 February 2015
- President: Ahmed Mohamed Mohamoud
- Preceded by: Hassan Haji Mohamoud
- Succeeded by: Abdillahi Ibrahim Habane

Personal details
- Citizenship: Somalilander
- Party: Peace, Unity, and Development Party

Zamzam Abdi Adan (Somali: Zamzam Cabdi Aadan) is a Somali politician, who served as the Minister of Education and Science of Somaliland from July 2010 to February 2015, becoming the first female minister to hold this position. In February 2015, after a cabinet reshuffle she was appointed as Minister of Finance where she served until the end of Silanyo's administration. She was one of four ministers who served throughout Silanyo's administration from 2010 to 2017, along Saad Ali Shire, Mohamoud Hashi Abdi and Khalil Abdillahi Ahmed.

== Biography ==
In the late 1970s, Zamzam Abdi Adan studied at Lafoole Teachers' College, where one of her lecturers was a professor named Suleiman who later became a prominent figure in Somaliland's higher education sector.

During the Somali civil war, Zamzam Abdi Adan lived as a member of the Somali diaspora community in the United Kingdom before later returning to Somaliland to engage in human rights activism and politics.

=== Executive director of development NGO ===
After returning to Somaliland, Zamzam Abdi Adan served as executive director of the development NGO Committee of Concerned Somalis (CCS). She, together with Rakiya Omaar, the director of African Rights, hired a lawyer to support a sixteen-year-old girl from Puntland who had been imprisoned on suspicion of spying and alleged rape, torture, and beating by prison guards. Their involvement brought the case to public attention. Still, both women faced criticism from parts of the Somaliland diaspora and others who argued that the negative publicity harmed Somaliland's image and efforts toward international recognition.

She also served as chair of the Somaliland Human Rights Organisations Network, commonly known as Shuro-Net. In May 2007, SHURO-net backed a legal challenge to the constitutionality of the government’s use of regional security committees as a means of ordering detention, but according to SHURO-net the chief justice of the Supreme Court summoned the organisation’s lawyer to his office and told him that he would not allow the complaint to be registered with the court clerk or adjudicated on its merits; when the lawyer protested, he was escorted from the building, arrested and held for about an hour at Hargeisa’s central police station. Five months later, a leadership struggle broke out within SHURO-net, and the government openly supported a faction opposed to the existing leadership; after that faction took control, the network was left effectively defunct. According to a statement issued by SHURO-Net in May 2007, Zamzam Abdi Aden was arrested by the police and placed in custody on the orders of the chairman of the court despite having committed no offence, and she was later released following the intervention of Hargeisa police commander Abdi Goon.

=== Education Minister ===
In July 2010, after becoming president, Ahmed Mohamed Mohamoud "Silanyo" formed his cabinet, and Zamzam Abdi Adan was the only woman appointed, being named Minister of Education and Higher Education.

Her tenure at the ministry with measures such as introducing free basic education, overseeing the construction of new schools across Somaliland and significantly expanding the number of public school teachers.

As minister, she oversaw national examinations and took part in initiatives highlighting high-achieving female students, including a 2011 event in Hargeisa organised to honour the best female secondary graduates.

In 2011, as minister, she announced that all public primary schooling in Somaliland would be fee-free, to increase enrolment among internally displaced people and low-income families.

=== Finance Minister ===
In February 2015, Finance Minister Abdiaziz Mohamed Samaale and Education Minister Zamzam Abdi Aden swapped posts in a cabinet reshuffle announced by President Ahmed Mohamed Mohamoud "Silanyo". Her appointment made her the first woman to serve as Somaliland’s minister of finance since the territory’s declaration of independence in 1991.

Shortly after taking over the finance portfolio, she rejected rumours that the government coffers were empty, stating that the treasury held enough money to cover six months of public expenditure and attributing the improved position to the cancellation of non-budgeted “under the table” payments and strengthened revenue collection; she also revealed that her ministry was negotiating with e-money providers to replace the US dollar with the Somaliland shilling as the currency used in mobile money transactions.

In December 2016 the cabinet adopted what local media described as the largest national budget in Somaliland’s 25-year history, a 2017 forecast equivalent to US$362.5 million—27.5 per cent higher than the 2016 budget and about 401 per cent above the 2010 level—and commended Zamzam Abdi Adan and her team at the Ministry of Finance for submitting a proposal that closely aligned with national priorities and living-standard concerns.

On 14 December 2017, after becoming president, Muse Bihi Abdi appointed Yusuf Mohamed Abdi Rage as minister of finance, with Zamzam Abdi Adan leaving the cabinet.

=== After that ===
In early February 2019, Zamzam Abdi Adan gave an interview to HCTV in which she rejected criticism that the former Silanyo administration had left the government’s finances in poor condition.

In late February 2019, Zamzam Abdi Adan was stripped of her membership of the ruling Kulmiye party’s central council alongside former Silanyo-era information minister Osman Abdilahi Sahardid (Adani), and both were consequently unable to attend that month’s central council gathering.

== See also ==
- Ministry of Finance (Somaliland)
- Cabinet of Somaliland
- Ministry of Education and Science (Somaliland)

Political offices
Preceded by Hassan Haji Mohamoud	Minister of Education and Science; 2010-2015	Succeeded by Abdillahi Ibrahim Habane
Preceded by Abdiaziz Mohamed Samale	Minister of Finance; 2015-2017	Succeeded by Yusuf Mohamed Abdi
