= Mohamed Hashi Elmi =

Somali politician

Mohamed Hashi Elmi محمد حاشي علمي
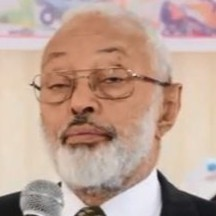

13th Minister of Finance
- In office 27 July 2010 – 14 March 2012
- President: Ahmed Mohamed Mohamoud
- Preceded by: Hussein Ali Duale
- Succeeded by: Abdiaziz Mohamed Samale

Mayor of Hargeisa
- In office 1993–1996
- President: Mohamed Haji Ibrahim Egal
- Preceded by: Omar Bobe Muse
- Succeeded by: Muse Mohamed Yusuf

Mohamed Hashi Elmi (Somali: Maxamed Xaashi Cilmi) is a Somali politician who served as the Minister of Finance of Somaliland from July 2010 to March 2012. He is the former mayor of Hargeisa from 1993 to 1996.

== Early life and education ==
In 1939, Mohamed Hashi Elmi was born in the city of Jigjiga, where he grew up and began studying the Quran. He belongs to the Sa'ad Musa sub-clan of the Habar Awal branch within the larger Isaaq clan.

He later moved to Hargeisa and completed his primary and intermediate education at the Hargeisa Trade School.

In 1957, Mohamed traveled to the United Kingdom to continue his studies. He graduated with a higher diploma in construction in 1960 and returned to the country in 1961 to work for the Ministry of Public Works in Berbera until 1964.

In 1964, Mohamed traveled to the United States to study civil engineering at the University of Los Angeles. He graduated with a degree in civil engineering in 1970 and returned home to work as an engineer for the Ministry of Public Works of the Somali Republic.

In 1972, Mohamed resigned from his government position and moved to Saudi Arabia. He established a private construction company there before getting involved in regional politics.

== Somali National Movement ==
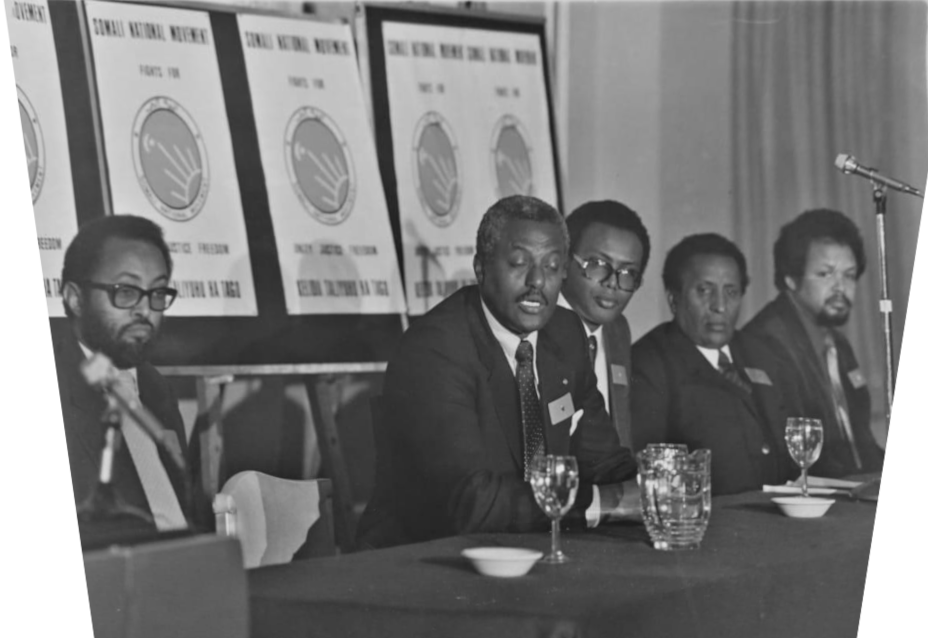
Declaration of the establishment of the Somali National Movement in April 1981. From left: Mohamed Hashi Elmi, Ahmed Duqsi, Abdisalam Yasin Mohamed, Hassan Adan Wadadid, Saeed Abdullahi.

In April 1981, Mohamed became one of the founding members of the Somali National Movement in London. He later stayed in Cairo and met other movement members, including Abdisalam Yasin, to monitor the political situation in their homeland.

In 1982, Mohamed became the Secretary of Finance for the Somali National Movement and served until 1986. In 1983, he traveled from Cairo through Addis Ababa to reach the Dabyl-weyne base in Ethiopia to support the struggle directly.

He ran for the chairmanship of the movement at the Balligubadle conference in 1990. However, the outgoing chairman, Ahmed Silanyo, formed a political alliance with the rival candidate, Abdirahman Ahmed Ali Tuur, and gave him full support. As a result, Mohamed narrowly lost the election to Tuur by only four votes.

In May 1991, Mohamed participated in the Burao conference where politicians declared the independence of Somaliland. President Mohamed Haji Ibrahim Egal appointed him as the Mayor of Hargeisa in 1993, and he served until early 1997.

== Political career ==
On 23 February 1997, Mohamed ran for the presidency of Somaliland during the national clan conference in Hargeisa. In this election, 315 selected delegates voted for the president instead of the public. Mohamed challenged the incumbent President Muhammad Haji Ibrahim Egal and politician Suleiman Mohamoud Adan, but he lost the election after receiving only two votes.

In 2003, President Dahir Riyale Kahin appointed Mohamed as the Minister of Commerce, Industries, and Ports. In 2004, Mohamed challenged the government by distributing documents that showed the actual revenues of the country to oppose inaccurate budget forecasts. This action caused a severe political dispute with the administration, which led to his removal from the ministry in 2005.

In 2007, Mohamed, Mohamed Abdi Gaboose, and Jamal Aydiid Ibrahim Abdi founded the Qaran political organization, and Mohamed became its first vice chairman. The government accused them of conducting illegal political activities outside the official election schedule and arrested the founders. Consequently, government authorities imprisoned them at Mandera Prison for four months and twenty days, and they were released on 18 December 2007.

In 2008, Mohamed and other members of the organization joined the Kulmiye party after their release.

== Minister of Finance ==
In July 2010, President Ahmed Mohamed Mohamoud appointed Mohamed as the Minister of Finance. President also alongside Mohamed Abdi Gaboose as the Minister of Interior, placing the former Qaran leaders in the two most important cabinet posts.

Upon taking office, Mohamed immediately addressed the country's severe financial crisis by investigating the national debts left by the previous government. Working with a special committee, he discovered that there was actually a budget surplus, revealing that the alleged debts were instead months of unpaid salaries for soldiers and civil servants, along with missing food funds for hospitals and prisons. Mohamed successfully cleared all of these outstanding salaries and state expenses within his first three months. To secure Somaliland's financial independence, he then launched the nation’s first digital tax infrastructure by dividing Hargeisa into small districts and establishing localized offices to register every shop, restaurant, and rental property. He recruited about thirty young IT and business university graduates as volunteers to input this census data into an electronic server, creating a centralized system to track tax compliance from a computer. Furthermore, to curb rampant tax evasion and smuggling, Mohamed systematically lowered tax rates to encourage honest public compliance; he reduced the profit tax on rental properties from 22% to 10% and cut the workers' income tax from 12% to 5%. As a direct result of these immediate digital and structural reforms, the national revenue grew by 32% in less than six months.

In December 2010, Mohamed suddenly became very ill and was flown to Djibouti for urgent medical treatment. He stayed in a French military hospital for three weeks to recover. Later that month, he returned to Hargeisa, where government ministers and hundreds of citizens gathered at the airport to welcome him back.

In January 2011, Mohamed announced that public primary and intermediate schools in Somaliland would become completely free. He also doubled the salaries of teachers. Although the Ministry of Education requested to hire 2,000 new teachers to handle more students, Mohamed's ministry limited the number to 1,500 due to the government's financial capacity.

In November 2011, Mohamed issued an official decree to collect income taxes from private schools to increase national revenue. This new rule forced all private school teachers and workers to pay taxes from their salaries for the first time. The Ministry of Finance worked closely with the Ministry of Education to enforce this law on around 100 private schools in Hargeisa.

During his tenure as minister, Mohamed significantly improved the infrastructure of Hargeisa General Hospital. He replaced all the old hospital beds that had been used since the British colonial era with modern ones. Furthermore, he repaired the stored kidney dialysis machines and brought in specialized doctors from abroad, which allowed the hospital to cover 80% of the local need for dialysis treatment.

During his two-year tenure, Mohamed significantly increased the national budget, implemented currency reforms in Burao, and made primary education free. He also insisted that the Ministry of Finance must monitor all funds entering the country, which caused a severe dispute with the Minister of Minerals. This conflict led to his removal from office.

In March 2012, Mohamed was removed from office.

A political analyst revealed that Mohamed was removed from office because he blocked the ruling Kulmiye party from using public funds. The party had borrowed massive election campaign debts from wealthy business owners. When these traders demanded repayment, Mohamed strictly protected the treasury and refused to pay them with government money, leading to his dismissal.

Customs workers revealed that Mohamed's management style sometimes caused technical problems. Because he lacked deep experience with specialized customs equipment, he often bypassed official procedures. When citizens called him directly to complain about customs disputes, he made immediate personal decisions, which occasionally caused financial losses for the state. Some employees at the Ministry of Finance welcomed Mohamed's dismissal because he was an extremely hard worker who forced his staff to work very long hours. While staff members acknowledged his strong competence for the role, they also described him as a strict and stubborn leader who rarely trusted others.

Mohamed's sudden removal from office caused major public debate among the citizens of Somaliland. The public widely believed that the major successes of the government, including free primary education and doubled salaries for workers, were entirely due to his personal efforts. Many citizens openly worried that corruption would return without him.

== Somaliland Consultation Forum ==
In July 2013, Mohamed and other opposition politicians founded a new organization called the National Consultation and Rectification Council (Somali: Golaha Wadatashiga iyo Toosinta Qaranka) in Hargeisa. The group included former vice presidents and leaders of political organizations that had failed in previous elections. Mohamed became a key member to criticize the policies of the government. Subsequently, Mohamed's group officially changed its name from a "Council" (Golaha) to a "Forum" (Madasha), becoming the Somaliland Consultation and Rectification Forum. This change was made to avoid heavy legal threats and pressure from the government, which had claimed that using the word "Council" for a political group outside the constitution was completely illegal.

In October 2017, Mohamed criticized the government committee for international recognition. He stated that the committee members would not bring any success to the country. He argued that instead of working for the independence of Somaliland, they were focusing too much on Somalia, which would fail to achieve any real results.

In June 2019, Mohamed and other members of the Somaliland Consultation Forum (Madasha) held a press conference in Hargeisa. He strongly opposed any delays in the upcoming elections. Mohamed criticized the government of President Muse Bihi Abdi for failing to complete the voter registration process on time.

In November 2019, Mohamed criticized the main opposition party, the Waddani party, for showing a lack of respect toward the presidency. He stated that the party refused to use the official title of President Muse Bihi Abdi and instead called him only "Muse." He urged opposition politicians to respect the head of state despite their election losses.

In January 2021, Mohamed released a public statement and spoke to a local television station to criticize the local government of Hargeisa and its complete lack of urban planning. He urged the mayor, Abdurrahman Mahmoud Aidiid, and the city council members to step down due to missing street lights, unnamed roads, unnumbered houses, and a lack of proper drainage systems. He also criticized former President Ahmed Mohamed Mohamoud and current President Muse Bihi Abdi for staying silent about the bad administration, warning voters against selecting incompetent candidates based on tribal loyalty.

In May 2021, Mohamed published an economic study and criticized the leaders of Somaliland for failing to improve the country. His report showed that the country spent over 3.3 billion dollars on importing cement and khat from 2004 to 2021. He stated that successive presidents failed to build local factories, causing massive financial losses.

In June 2021, Mohamed spoke to the media in Hargeisa after the parliamentary and local elections. He urged the newly elected officials to protect public wealth and stop corruption. He also recommended that all elected politicians must register their personal assets before taking office to prevent the illegal use of public funds.

== Death ==
In November 2023, Mohamed died at a hospital in Riyadh, Saudi Arabia. President Muse Bihi Abdi and other national leaders sent condolences to his family, and local media broadcast details of his long political career.

== See also ==
- Mayor of Hargeisa
- Cabinet of Somaliland
- Ministry of Finance (Somaliland)

Political offices
Preceded by Omar Bobe Muse	Mayor of Hargeisa; 1993-1996	Succeeded by Muse Mohamed Yusuf
Preceded by Hussein Ali Duale	Minister of Finance; 2010-2012	Succeeded by Abdiaziz Mohamed Samale
