= Hussein Ali Duale =

Somali politician

Hussein Ali Dualeh
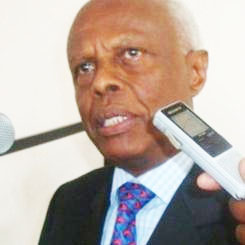

12th Minister of Finance
- In office 28 August 2003 – 27 July 2010
- President: Dahir Riyale Kahin
- Preceded by: Hussein Farah Dodi
- Succeeded by: Mohamed Hashi Elmi

Hussein Ali Dualeh (Somali: Xuseen Cali Ducaaleh), commonly known as Awil (Somali: Cawil), is a Somali diplomat and politician who served as the Finance Minister of Somaliland, and former ambassador of the Somali Democratic Republic to Kenya and Uganda. Dualeh was appointed as presidential advisor on Foreign Affairs and International Recognition to Somaliland to former President Ahmed Mohamed Mohamoud and Senior Adviser to the President Muse Bihi Abdi to negotiate with Somalia. He is considered a great expert on the affairs of the Horn of Africa.

== Biography ==
Hussein Ali Duale was born in Hargeisa and went to school in Aden. He received his training as a military cadet in the United Kingdom and returned as a commissioned officer in time for Somaliland's independence in 1960.

In 1961 along with several British trained officers, Duale took part in an aborted coup in northern Somalia (now Somaliland) to restore its sovereignty, as the result of the unbalanced union with Italian Somaliland in 1960. The coup was put down by soldiers loyal to the Somali Republic and after a lengthy trail, all the officers were acquitted of treason charges and subsequently retired from active service.

However, in 1964, in the first Somalia/Ethiopia war, Duale was returned to active service and saw action in the southern sector of that particular military engagement. After the brief "war", he entered the diplomatic service and held several positions at various Somali Republic embassies.

In 1973, Duale was appointed to head the defunct Somali Democratic Republic's embassy in Kampala. This was the height of Idi Amin's reign in Uganda.

In 1977 Duale was recalled from his post in Kenya to take part in the Somali/Ethiopian war. Ambassador Awil who had opposed the war, defected to Kenya, but later returned to Somaliland in the 1990s.

He published his memoirs in 2005. On September 2, 2016, Duale launched his third book "Raad Raac Taariikh Soomaaliyeed" in Hargeisa, Somaliland.

== Works ==
- From Barre to Aideed: Somalia – the agony of a nation. Nairobi, Kenya: Stellagraphics Ltd., 1994.
- Search for a new Somali identity. Nairobi: H. A. Dualeh, 2002.
