= Ministry of Planning (Somaliland) =

Government ministry of Somaliland

Republic of Somaliland Ministry of Planning & National Development
- Wasaaradda Qorshaynta & Horumarinta Qaranka (MoPND)
- Coat of arms of Somaliland

Ministry overview
- Formed: 1991; 35 years ago
- Jurisdiction: Somaliland
- Headquarters: Hargeisa, Maroodi Jeh (Somaliland)
- Minister responsible: Kaltuun Sh Hassan Abdi, Minister
- Ministry executives: Mohamed Saed Mohamoud, Director General
- Website: https://mopnd.govsomaliland.org/

Footnotes
- Ministry of Planning on Facebook

The Ministry of Planning & National Development of the Republic of Somaliland (MoPND) (Somali: Wasaaradda Qorshaynta & Horumarinta Qaranka Somaliland) (Arabic: وزارة التخطيط والتنمية الوطنية) is a cabinet ministry of the Government of Somaliland. The ministry is responsible for appropriate plans and strategies for development capable of ensuring that the long-term goals of the country are achieved. Establish long-term, medium-term, and short-term plans encompassing all economic and social aspects of the Somaliland people’s life, through fostering community engagement.

== History ==
In March 1992, the Minister of Planning and Reconstruction and the Minister of Health traveled to London and Paris on a diplomatic mission. During their visit, they briefed European authorities on the internal situation in Somaliland and sought international assistance for the country's national reconstruction efforts.

In January 2007, a consultative workshop held in Hargeisa led to the production of the Somaliland Reconstruction and Development Program (RDP) 2007–2011, marking the country's first formal five-year development plan. To support the implementation of the RDP, the Ministry of Planning developed Somaliland's inaugural National Aid Coordination and Monitoring & Evaluation Policy, establishing a framework for the systematic oversight of international assistance and development projects.

In November 2010, the Non-Governmental Organization Act (Law No. 43/2010) was enacted, designating the Ministry of Planning as the official authority responsible for the regulation and registration of both domestic and international non-governmental organizations (NGOs) operating within Somaliland.

In March 2012, the Government of Somaliland launched its first five-year National Development Plan (2012–2016), aimed at transitioning the nation from post-conflict recovery to sustainable development. The plan, estimated to cost $1.19 billion, focused on five strategic pillars: economy, infrastructure, governance, social services, and environmental protection. By prioritizing poverty reduction and job creation, the initiative sought to foster a business-friendly environment to attract private sector investment and international development assistance.

In October 2013, the Statistics Act (Law No. 60/2013) was enacted, providing the Central Statistics Department (CSD) within the Ministry of Planning with the legal mandate as the sole authority for coordinating the National Statistical System, conducting national censuses, and collecting and analyzing official statistical data.

In July 2017, the Ministry of Planning and National Development officially launched the Second National Development Plan (NDP II) for the period 2017–2021. The strategy was designed to implement the "Somaliland Vision 2030" and marked the first time the United Nations Sustainable Development Goals (SDGs) were systematically integrated into Somaliland's national planning framework.

On 7 October 2020, the Ministry of Planning and National Development and the Ministry of Health Development officially launched the Somaliland Health and Demographic Survey (SLHDS) 2020. The report provided the first comprehensive data on maternal and child health, nutrition, and household characteristics in Somaliland.

In March 2023, the Third National Development Plan (NDP III), covering the period from 2023 to 2027 and hosted by the Ministry of Planning and National Development, was officially launched by the President. The plan prioritizes six strategic pillars: economic development, good governance, climate change, economic infrastructure, social development, and justice.

In April 2024, the Ministry of Planning and National Development initiated legal consultancy services for the review and amendment of the 2010 NGO Act (Law No. 43/2010). This process was aimed at addressing legislative gaps and deficiencies that had emerged in the decade since the law's original enactment.

In January 2025, the Minister of Planning and National Development and the Deputy Head of the British Office in Hargeisa held a meeting to conduct specific discussions on doubling the scale of ongoing development projects in Somaliland and further strengthening cooperation between the two nations.

== Ministers ==
Minister	Ministry name	Took office	Left office
Djama Rabile Ghod (Jaamac Rabiile Good)	Ministry of Planning and Reconstruction (Wasaaradda Qorshaynta iyo Dib-u-dhiska)	June 1991	1993
Osman Abdillahi Jama (Cismaan Cabdillaahi Jaamac)	Ministry of Planning and Coordination (Wasaaradda Qorshaynta iyo Isu-duwidda)	1993	1997
Mohamed Osman Fadal (Maxamed Cismaan Fadal)	Ministry of National Planning and Coordination (Wasaaradda Qorsheynta Qaranka iyo Isuduwidda)		October 2001
Ahmed Jam Botan (Axmed Jaamac Bootaan)	Ministry of National Planning and Coordination (Wasaaradda Qorsheynta Qaranka iyo Isuduwidda)	October 2001	
Mohamed Said Gees (Maxamed Siciid Gees)	Ministry of National Planning and Coordination (Wasaaradda Qorsheynta Qaranka iyo Isuduwidda)	1997	March 1999
Ahmed Hassan Caafi (Axmed Xasan Caafi)	Ministry of National Planning and Coordination (Wasaaradda Qorsheynta Qaranka iyo Isuduwidda)	March 2002	November 2002
Ahmed Haji Dahir Ilmi (Axmed Xaaji Daahir Cilmi)	Ministry of National Planning and Coordination (Wasaaradda Qorsheynta Qaranka iyo Isuduwidda)	November 2002	6 August 2006
Ali Mahamed Ibrahim (Cali-sanyare) (Cali Maxamed Ibraahim)	Ministry of National Planning and Coordination (Wasaaradda Qorsheynta Qaranka iyo Isuduwidda)	6 August 2006	July 2010
Saad Ali Shire (Saacad Cali Shire)	Ministry of National Planning and International Cooperation (Wasaaradda Qorsheynta Qaranka iyo Iskaashiga Caalamiga ah)	28 July 2010	October 2015
Ali Hussein Ismail (Cali Xuseen Ismaaciil)	Ministry of National Planning and Development (Wasaaradda Qorshaynta iyo Horumarinta Qaranka)	October 2015	December 2016
Mohamed Ibrahim Adan (Qabyo-tire) (Maxamed Ibraahim Aadan)	Ministry of National Planning and Development (Wasaaradda Qorshaynta iyo Horumarinta Qaranka)	December 2016	December 2017
Hassan Mohammed Ali (Gaafadhi) (Xasan Maxamed Cali)	Ministry of Planning and National Development (Wasaaradda Qorshaynta iyo Horumarinta Qaranka)	1 December 2019	September 2021
Omar Ali Abdillahi (Cumar Cali Cabdillaahi)	Ministry of Planning and National Development (Wasaaradda Qorshaynta iyo Horumarinta Qaranka)	5 September 2021	June 2022
Ahmed Adan Ahmed (Buuxane) (Axmed Aadan Axmed)	Ministry of Planning and National Development (Wasaaradda Qorshaynta iyo Horumarinta Qaranka)	June 2022	November 2023
Ahmed Mohamed Diriye (Toorno) (Axmed Maxamed Diiriye)	Ministry of Planning and National Development (Wasaaradda Qorshaynta iyo Horumarinta Qaranka)	November 2023	
Kaltun Sheikh Hassan Abdi (Madar) (Kaltuun Sh. Xasan Cabdi)	Ministry of Planning and National Development (Wasaaradda Qorshaynta iyo Horumarinta Qaranka)	14 December 2024	Incumbent

== See also ==
- Politics of Somaliland
