= Ministry of Information and Communication Technology (Somaliland) =

Government ministry of Somaliland

Republic of Somaliland Ministry of Information and Communication Technology
- Wasaaradda Isgaadhsiinta iyo Tignoolajiyadda; MICT
- Coat of arms of Somaliland

Ministry overview
- Formed: 1993; 33 years ago (as the Ministry of Post and Communication)
- Jurisdiction: Somaliland
- Headquarters: Maroodi Jeex, Hargeisa (Somaliland)
- Minister responsible: Minister
- Website: https://mict.govsomaliland.org/

Footnotes
- Ministry of Information and Communication Technology on Facebook

The Ministry of Information and Communication Technology of the Republic of Somaliland (MICT) (Somali: Wasaaradda Isgaadhsiinta iyo Tignoolajiyadda Somaliland) (Arabic: وزارة الاتصالات والتكنولوجيا) is a member of the Somaliland government ministries which is responsible for formulating developmental policies aimed at accelerating growth of telecommunication and technology services in the country.

The name of this ministry was originally the Ministry of Post and Communication (Somali: Wasaarada Boosaha iyo Isgaadhsiinta). By presidential decree in 2018, it became the Ministry of Information and Communication Technology. This ministry is also translated as Ministry of Communications and Technology or Ministry of Telecommunications and Technology.

== History ==
In 2013, Mohamed Jama Abgaal was appointed Minister of Posts and Communications. He stated that before assuming office he had felt dissatisfied with being appointed to what he believed was not a major ministry, but shortly after taking office he realized that the ministry held a highly significant role. He further noted that the objectives for which the ministry had originally been established had not yet been fully achieved, due to various circumstances and constraints. He also explained that Somaliland’s telecommunications sector was effectively managed by independent private companies that had grown economically strong, while the government institutions that were expected to regulate and oversee them remained comparatively weaker, resulting in a considerable gap between the state and the private sector.

In January 2015, after a local newspaper reported that the Ministry of Posts and Communications had sold part of its compound, the ministry denied that any such sale had taken place.

In August 2017, the Federal Government of Somalia announced a telecommunications regulatory law that included Somaliland within its scope, but the Somaliland Minister of Posts and Communications stated that Somaliland is an independent state and that the Somali law does not apply to Somaliland.

In March 2019, elders from Somaliland diaspora communities living in the United Kingdom issued a press statement criticizing the Ministry of Posts and Communications, stating that it was unclear what work the ministry was undertaking for the country.

== Ministers ==
Image	Minister	Somali Name	Term start	Term end
	Osman Adan Dool	Cismaan Aadan Dool	1993	
	Hassan Abdi Kheyre	Xasan Cabdi Kheyre	July 2003	June 2006
	Liban Duale Asayr	Liibaan Ducaale Casayr	June 2006	
	Ali Mahamud Ahmed	Cali Maxamuud Axmed	December 2009	
	Abdirisaq Ibrahim Mohamed	Cabdirisaaq Ibraahim Maxamed	28 July 2010	15 January 2011
	Ahmed Hashi Oday	Axmed Xaashi Oday	15 January 2011	13 March 2012
	Ali Cilmi Gele	Cali Cilmi Geele	13 March 2012	26 June 2013
	Mohamed Jama Abgal	Maxamed Jaamac Abgaal	26 June 2013	April 2016
	(Vacant)		April 2016	
	Mahamud Sheikh Abdillahi Ige	Maxamuud Sheekh Cabdillaahi Cige	August 2016	June 2017
	Mustafe Farah Abrar	Mustafe Faarax Abraar	June 2017	
	Abdiweli Sheikh Abdillahi	Cabdilaahi Sheekh Cabdilaahi Jibriil	14 December 2017	14 November 2023
	Ahmed Yusuf Idris Cawale	Axmed Yuusuf Idiris Cawaale	14 November 2023	
	Jamal Mohamed Jama	Jamaal Maxamed Jaamac	December 2024	
	Abdisalaan Hussein Awale	Cabdisalaan Xuseen Cawaale	April 2026	Present

== See also ==
- Politics of Somaliland
- Cabinet of Somaliland
