= Governor of Sahil =

Head of Somaliland region of Sahil

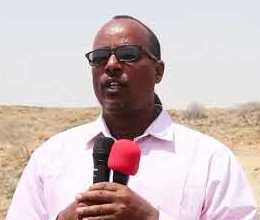
- Incumbent; Ahmed Osman Hassan since April 10, 2018
- Style: The Honorable
- Term length: no term limit
- Formation: May 25, 1992

The Governor of Sahil is the chief executive of the Somaliland region of Sahil, leading the region's executive branch. Governors of the region are appointed to office by the Somaliland president. The current governor of Sahil is Ahmed Osman Hassan.

== See also ==
- Sahil
- Politics of Somaliland
