= Ministry of Education and Science (Somaliland) =

Government ministry of Somaliland

Republic of Somaliland Ministry of Education & Science
- Wasaaradda Waxbarashada iyo Sayniska Somaliland
- Coat of arms of Somaliland

Ministry overview
- Formed: 1992; 34 years ago
- Jurisdiction: Somaliland
- Headquarters: Hargeisa, Maroodi Jeh (Somaliland)
- Minister responsible: Ahmed Aden Buhane, Minister
- Website: https://moe.govsomaliland.org/

Footnotes
- Ministry of Education and Science on Facebook

Education in Somaliland

Ministry of Education and Science (Somaliland)

National education budget (2015)
- Budget: 5% of GDP

General details
- Primary languages: Somali, Arabic and English

Literacy
- Total: 92.5%
- Male: 95.5%
- Female: 85.5%

The Ministry of Education and Science of the Republic of Somaliland (Somali: Wasaaradda Waxbarashada iyo Sayniska Somaliland) (Arabic: وزارة التعليم والعلوم) The Ministry of Education and Science of Somaliland is a national executive authority responsible for the state policy development and normative and legal regulation in the sphere of education, research, scientific, technological and innovation activities, nanotechnology, intellectual property, as well as in the sphere of nurturing, social support and social protection of students and pupils of educational institutions. The work of the Ministry of Education and Science of Somaliland is governed by the Constitution of the Republic of Somaliland, National Education Act, National Constitutional Laws, and Decrees by the President of the Republic of Somaliland. It in cooperation with other national executive bodies, executive bodies of the subjects of the Republic of Somaliland, local authorities, public associations and other institutions. The current minister is Ahmed Mohamed Diriye.

== Departments ==
- Formal Education Department
- Non-formal Education Department
- Technical and Vocational Department
- Information and Communication Department
- Human Resource Department
- Educational Resources Department
- Administration and Finance Department
- Quality Assurance Department
- Inclusive Education Department
- Education Balancing Department
- Teacher Training college
- Somali Language Development academy

Citation:

== Somaliland Education System ==
The Somaliland education system has four main levels: pre-primary, primary/alternative, secondary/vocational and higher education. Pre-primary (early childhood) is now integrated into formal education and in private Quranic School systems, running for up to two to three years. Primary schooling lasts for eight years and is divided into a four year-elementary or lower primary cycle and a four-year intermediate or upper primary cycle. Secondary education and Vocational Training (as per design) also run for four years. The exception is the Arabic medium schools, which have 9 years of primary/intermediate schooling and 3 years of secondary education. The tertiary level for both systems has a minimum of two years with many running for four. Each subsector is described and assessed in detail in the relevant chapters of this report.

== Vision ==
Somaliland envisions education as means to prepare all learners to become life-long learners equipped with the skills, knowledge and attitudes to be successfully productive citizens. This supports the Government of Somaliland's Vision 2030, which states that Somaliland will be “A nation whose citizens enjoy equitable and quality education.” The Vision provides a roadmap to ensure that no one is left behind in national development, through its intent on affirmative action. Vision 2030 inspires Somalilanders to focus on commonly owned goals concerning shared values and principles around which they can rally to build a prosperous nation.

== National Education Objectives ==
- To National goals for the sectors are as follows:
- To build the foundation for learners to be committed to the preservation and enrichment of their culture, and Islamic values.
- To provide learners with appropriate knowledge, insights, skills and values as well as empowering them to realize their potential that will enable them to make worthwhile contributions to society.
- To provide children with the listening, speaking, reading and writing skills in Somali, Arabic, and English.
- To provide a sound foundation of arithmetic and the application of mathematics to practical problems.
- To build the foundation for learners in the three areas of science while developing for them the practical application skills.
- To lay the foundation for basic information technology, and the awareness of the role of technology in national development
- To support learner in acquiring practical skills and manual dexterity through productive activities integrated into the actual curriculum.
- Provide learners the opportunity to develop their individual talents and ability to acquire critical thinking, self-expression, self-reliance, and logical judgment
- To provide students the opportunities to appreciate learning and develop desire to continue learning
- To prepare students for tertiary and higher education, technical and vocational trainings.
- To provide young people with the basic skills which help them to contribute various communities in Somaliland in areas of animal husbandry, fishing, agriculture, budgeting, family welfare, community development, care for the environment, community health and physical fitness.
- To raise awareness among pupils about issues including reproductive health, HIV/AIDS, and STDs.

== Former Ministers of Education And Science ==
Image	Minister	Term start	Term End
	Hassan Haji Mohamoud	5 July 2003	27 July 2010
	Zamzam Abdi Adan	27 July 2010	28 February 2015
	Abdiaziz Mohamed Samale	28 February 2015	30 October 2015
	Abdillahi Ibrahim Habane	30 October 2015	14 December 2017
	Yasin Haji Mohamoud	14 December 2017	10 November 2018
	Osman Adan Jama	10 November 2018	1 December 2019
	Ahmed Mohamed Dirie	1 December 2019	22 November 2023
	Ahmed Adan Buhane	22 November 2023	December 2024
	Ismail Yusuf Duale Guuleed	December 2024	Incumbent

== See also ==
- Ministry of Finance (Somaliland)
- Ministry of Interior (Somaliland)
- Ministry of Defence (Somaliland)
