= Djama Rabile Ghod =

Statesman Djama Rabile Ghod Jaamac Rabiile Good جمة ربيل جود
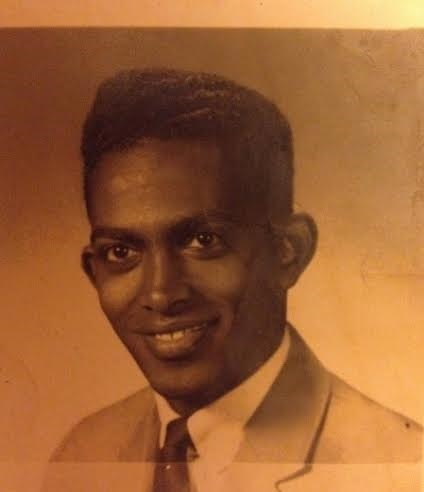

Statesman of Somalia

Minister for Tourism and National Parks.
- In office December 1974 – January 1980

Adviser to the Revolutionary Council Economic Committee
- In office January 1976 – July 1976

Director-General of the Ministry of Livestock, Forestry and Ranges
- In office March 1973 – December 1974

Director-General of the Ministry of Planning
- In office April 1970 – March 1973

Director of Planning Section of the Ministry of Planning and Coordination
- In office 1969–1970

Part of Ministry of Planning
- In office 1965–1968

Personal details
- Born: 1942 (age 83–84) Borama, Awdal, Somalia
- Relatives: Muse Rabile Ghod
- Education: Wesleyan University University of Massachusetts
- Profession: Statesman, minister and politician

Djama Rabile Goad or Jama Rabile Ghod (Somali: Jaamac Rabiile Good, Arabic: جمة ربيل جود); born 1942), also known as Djama Rabile Got, was a Somali statesman (politician) of the former Somali Republic and Somali Democratic Republic. He was a respected figure with a long career of serving his people and nation.

== History ==
He was born in Borama, Awdal, and belongs to the Bahabr Muse (Bahabar Muuse), Mahamed 'Ase (Maxamed Case) section of the Gadabursi (Gadabuursi) or Samaron (Samaroon) clan. In his early years he went to the elementary and intermediate schools in Borama and Amud, Somalia. His secondary education he received at Amud and Sheikh (1957–1961). For his higher education he went to the United States, Wesleyan University (1961–1965) where he received his B.A. for Economics & Statistics and University of Massachusetts (1968–1969) where he received his M.A. for Economics.

After he finished his education at the University of Massachusetts he went back to the capital of the Somali Democratic Republic or Somalia and started his career by joining the Ministry of Planning (1965–1968). Later on after he acquired his M.A. he came on to become the Director of Planning Section of the Ministry of Planning and Coordination (1969–1970). Excelling in his work he managed to become the Director-General of the Ministry of Planning (April 1970 – March 1973), which he served as for 3 years. Later on he also came to serve his country as Director-General of the Ministry of Livestock, Forestry and Ranges (March 1973 – Dec. 1974), Secretary of State or Minister for Tourism and National Parks. (Dec. 1974 – Jan. 1976) and Adviser to the Revolutionary Council Economic Committee (Jan. 1976 – July 1980).

=== Education ===
- Elementary and Intermediate: Borama and Amud
- Secondary: Amud and Sheikh (1957–1961)
- Higher: Wesleyan University (1961–1965) and University of Massachusetts (1968-1969)

=== Dipl. ===
- B.A. for Economics & Statistics (1965)
- M.A. for Economics. (1969)

=== Career ===
- Part of Ministry of Planning (1965–1968)
- Director of Planning Section of the Ministry of Planning and Coordination (1969–1970)
- Director-General of the Ministry of Planning (April 1970 – March 1973)
- Director-General of the Ministry of Livestock, Forestry and Ranges (March 1973 – Dec. 1974)
- Secretary of State or Minister for Tourism and National Parks. (Dec. 1974 – Jan. 1980)
- Adviser to the Revolutionary Council Economic Committee (Jan. 1976 – July 1976).
