= Ahmed Mohamed Diriye =

Somali politician

Ahmed Mohamed Dirie (Toorno) احمد محمد ديري

Minister of Planning
- In office 22 November 2023 – 18 December 2024
- President: Muse Bihi Abdi
- Preceded by: Ahmed Aden Buhane
- Succeeded by: Kaltun Sh.Hassan Abdi

Minister of Education and Science
- In office 1 December 2019 – 22 November 2023
- President: Muse Bihi Abdi
- Preceded by: Osman Adan Jama
- Succeeded by: Ahmed Aden Buhane

Personal details
- Occupation: Politician

Ahmed Mohamed Dirie (Somali: Axmed Maxamed Diiriye), commonly known as Toorno, is a Somaliland politician, who served as the Minister of Education and Science of Somaliland from Dec 2019 to Nov 2023 . In November 2023, after the resignation of several cabinet ministers, he was appointed as Minister of Planning, where he worked at the end of the administration.

== See also ==
- Ministry of Planning (Somaliland)
- Cabinet of Somaliland
- Ministry of Education and Science (Somaliland)

Political offices
Preceded by Osman Adan Jama	Minister of Education and Science; 2019–2023	Succeeded by Ahmed Aden Buhane
Preceded by Ahmed Aden Buhane	Ministry of Planning (Somaliland); 2023–2024	Succeeded by kaltun Sh.Hassan Abdi
