= Saad Ali Shire =

British-Somali politician, agronomist and economist

Dr. Saad Hj-Ali Shire
- د. سعد علي شيره
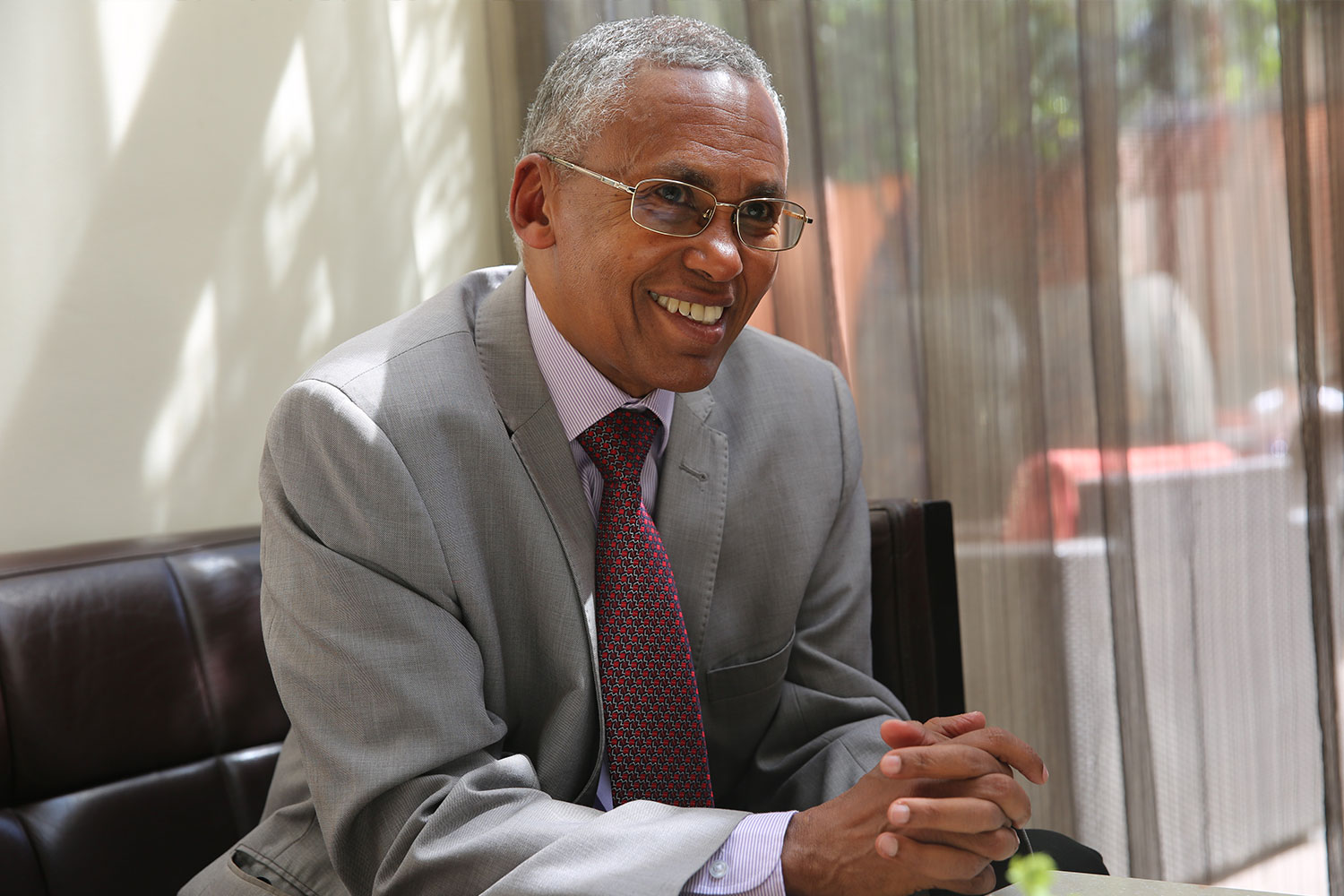
- Shire in 2018

17th Minister of Finance
- In office 10 November 2018 – 13 November 2024
- President: Muse Bihi Abdi
- Preceded by: Yusuf Mohamed Abdi

12th Minister of Foreign Affairs
- In office 28 October 2015 – 10 November 2018
- President: Muse Bihi Abdi; Ahmed Mohamed Mohamoud
- Preceded by: Mohamed Bihi Yonis
- Succeeded by: Yasin Haji Mohamoud

Minister of Planning and National Development
- In office 28 July 2010 – 28 October 2015
- President: Ahmed Mohamed Mohamoud
- Preceded by: Ali Ibrahim Mohamed
- Succeeded by: Ali Hussein Ismail

Personal details
- Born: Burao, British Somaliland (now Somaliland)
- Citizenship: Somalilander, British
- Party: Peace, Unity, and Development Party
- Children: 3
- Education: Pennsylvania State University; University of Havana; Somali National University

Dr. Saad Ali Shire Naleye (Somali: Dr. Sacad Cali Shire Naaleeye) is a British-Somaliland politician, agronomist and economist, who is currently serving as the Minister of Finance of Somaliland. Shire formerly served as the Foreign Minister of Somaliland. He also served as the Minister of Planning and National Development of Somaliland. He is a founder member of many academic institutions and professional associations including The University of Hargeisa, the University of Burao, Somaliland Society of Agriculture, Somaliland Economics Association, Somaliland Statistics Association, and Somaliland Society of UK.

== Early life and education ==
Shire was born in Burao. He later moved to Mogadishu, where he studied agriculture at Somali National University, then to Havana University in Cuba, where he earned a bachelor's degree. He subsequently attended Pennsylvania State University in the United States, where he completed his master's and PhD degrees in agricultural economics. He also has a post graduate diploma in Islamic banking. He is an IMC member of the Chartered Financial Analysts (CFA) Society of UK.

== Career ==
=== Early career ===
Prior to entering the politics, he was the managing director for UK and Europe of Dahabshiil Transfer Services Limited, (a money service company). Before that he held senior positions in the community development sector, lectured at the College of Agriculture at Somali National University and worked for the UN Food and Agricultural organization (FAO). He also worked for the World Bank headquarters in Washington DC.

=== Minister of Planning ===
On 28 July 2010, after Kulmiye won the 2010 presidential election, President Ahmed Mohamed Mohamoud appointed Shire as the Minister of Planning and National Development where he stayed until 2015.

=== Minister of Foreign affairs ===
After the resignation of his predecessor Mohamed Yonis, Shire was transferred into Minister of Foreign Affairs and International Cooperation, he was one of few ministers who made a comeback after the 2017 presidential election which Muse Bihi Abdi won as new President of Somaliland, along with Shukri Haji Ismail and Khalil Abdillahi Ahmed.

=== Minister of Finance ===
Shire was appointed for the current post as Minister of Financial Development by president Bihi after his first cabinet reshuffle in November 2018.

== Committee assignments ==
During his tenure as minister he served in many committees including the National Planning commission, Somaliland Development Fund Joint Steering Committee, Somaliland Business Fund Grant Advisory Panel, Civil Service Reform Committee, Public Finance Reform Committee, Budget Policy Committee, Private Sector Reform Committee, Land Policy Reform Committee, Berbera Port/Corridor Development Committee, the Board of the University of Hargeisa and the Board of Berbera Maritime and Fisheries Academy.

== See also ==
- Ministry of Foreign Affairs (Somaliland)
- Ministry of Finance (Somaliland)
- Ministry of Planning (Somaliland)
- List of Somalis

Political offices
Preceded by Ali Ibrahim Mohamed	Minister of Planning and National Development; 2010–2015	Succeeded by Ali Hussein Ismail
Preceded by Mohamed Bihi Yonis	Minister of Foreign Affairs; 2015–2018	Succeeded by Yasin Haji Mohamoud
Preceded by Yusuf Mohamed Abdi	Minister of Finance; 2018–present	Incumbent
