= Ministry of Finance (Somaliland) =

Government ministry of Somaliland

Republic of Somaliland Ministry of Finance Development
- Wasaaradda Horumarinta Maaliyadda
- Coat of arms of Somaliland

Ministry overview
- Formed: 1991; 35 years ago
- Jurisdiction: Somaliland
- Headquarters: Hargeisa, Maroodi Jeh (Somaliland)
- Minister responsible: Abdilahi Hassan Aadam, Minister
- Ministry executives: Ismael Mawlid Abdilahi, Deputy/Vice Minister; Mohammed Hassan Saleban, Director General
- Website: slmof.org

The Ministry of Finance Development of the Republic of Somaliland (Somali: Wasaaradda Horumarinta Maaliyadda Qaranka Jamhuuriyadda Somaliland) (Arabic: وزارة المالية) is the Somaliland government ministry which is concerned with the economy of Somaliland. In particular, it concerns itself with taxation, financial legislation, financial institutions and capital markets. it's also responsible for planning and carrying out the government policy on public finance and budget and it applies and manages the regional and local financing systems and the provision of information on the economic-financial activity of the different public administrations. The current minister is Abdilahi Hassan Aadam.

== Ministers of Finance ==
No.	Image	Minister	Term start	Term end
1		Ismail Mahmud Hurre	1991	1993
2		Abdillahi Mohamed Duale	1993	1994
3		Ibrahim Abdi Muse	1994	1994
4		Mohamed Ahmed Samatar	1994	1994
5		Mohamed Dhimbil Galbedi	1994	1995
6		Awil Haji Omar	1995	1996
7		Suleiman Mohamoud Adan	1996	1997
8		Yusuf Ainab Muse	1997	1997
9		Ahmed Mohamed Mohamoud	1997	1999
10		Mohamed Said Gees	1999	2001
11		Husein Farah Dodi	2001	2003
12		Hussein Ali Duale	2003	2010
13		Mohamed Hashi Elmi	2010	March 2012
14		Abdiaziz Mohamed Samale	March 2012	2015
15		Zamzam Abdi Adan	February 2015	December 2017
16		Yusuf Mohamed Abdi	December 2017	November 2018
17		Dr. Saad Ali Shire	November 2018	2024
18		Abdilahi Hassan Aadam	2024	Present

== See also ==
- Diplomatic missions of Somaliland
- Foreign relations of Somaliland
