= Ahmed Mohamed Mohamoud =

President of Somaliland from 2010 to 2017

- احمد محمد محمود; Axmed Maxamed Maxamuud
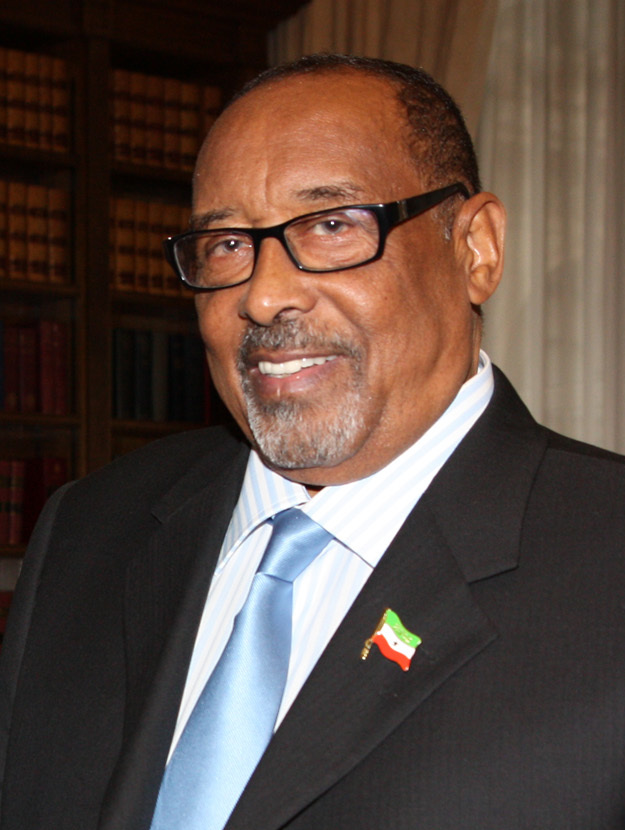
- Mohamoud in 2011

4th President of Somaliland
- In office 27 July 2010 – 13 December 2017
- Vice President: Abdirahman Saylici
- Preceded by: Dahir Riyale Kahin
- Succeeded by: Muse Bihi Abdi

Chairman of Peace, Unity, and Development Party
- In office 2002–2010
- Preceded by: Position established
- Succeeded by: Muse Bihi Abdi

9th Minister of Finance
- In office 1997–1999
- President: Muhammad Haji Ibrahim Egal
- Preceded by: Yusuf Ainab Muse
- Succeeded by: Mohamed Said Mohamed

Somaliland House of Representatives
- In office 1993–1996

Chairman of the Somali National Movement
- In office 9 August 1984 – April 1990
- Preceded by: Colonel Abdiqadir Kosar Abdi
- Succeeded by: Abdirahman Ahmed Ali Tuur

Minister of Commerce of the Somali Democratic Republic
- In office 1980–1982
- President: Mohamed Siad Barre
- In office 1973–1978
- President: Mohamed Siad Barre

Minister of Planning and International Cooperation of the Somali Republic
- In office 1965–1973
- President: Mohamed Siad Barre

Personal details
- Born: 1 June 1938 Burao, British Somaliland (now Somaliland)
- Died: 15 November 2024 (aged 86) Hargeisa, Somaliland
- Citizenship: Somaliland
- Party: Peace, Unity, and Development
- Spouse: Amina-Weris Sh. Mohamed
- Education: SOS Sheikh Secondary School; University of Manchester
- Nickname: Silanyo

Ahmed Mohamed Mohamoud (Somali: Axmed Maxamed Maxamuud, Arabic: احمد محمد محمود; 1 June 1938 – 15 November 2024), known by his nickname Silanyo (Arabic: سيلانيو), was a Somaliland politician who served as the President of Somaliland from 2010 to 2017. During the 1980s, he served as the Chairman of the Somali National Movement.

Silanyo was a long-time member of the former Somali Republic and later the Somali Democratic Republic central government. He held several key positions, including serving as Minister of Commerce of the Somali Republic.

Standing as an opposition candidate, he was elected as President of Somaliland in Somaliland's 2010 presidential election.

== Background ==
=== Early life ===
Ahmed Mohamed Mohamoud was born in 1938 in the Mid Eastern town of Burco, situated in what was then the former British Somaliland protectorate. Nicknamed "Silanyo" (meaning lizard in Somali), he hailed from the Adan Madobe sub-division of the Habar Jeclo clan of Isaaq clan-family. Mohamoud is the third child of six. His father was a merchant marine; so the family lived a half-nomadic, half-settled lifestyle. He was the only child in the family to attend a formal education, fostered by an uncle who was a strong influence on his early life. His brothers followed their father's footsteps as merchant marines. He was Muslim.

=== Education ===
Between 1946 and 1957, Mohamoud studied at schools in Sheikh, Somaliland and Amud, where he completed his secondary levels.

Upon graduation, he moved to England to pursue higher studies. From 1958 to 1960, Mohamoud enrolled in London University and obtained an advanced General Certificate of Education (GCE). He then studied at University of Manchester, where he earned both a Bachelor's Degree (1960–1963) and a Master's Degree (1963–1965) in Economics.

=== Personal life and death ===
He met his wife, Amina-Weris Sh. Mohamed, in the late 1960s. Like him, she completed her education as a registered nurse and midwife in England. They married in Mogadishu in 1968.

Mohamoud died in Hargeisa, Somaliland on 13 November 2024, at the age of 86.

== Political career ==
=== General ===
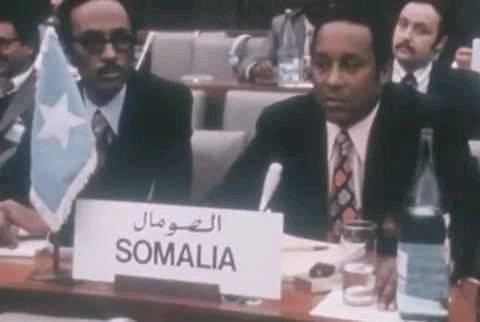
Mohamoud in 1975

In a professional capacity, between 1965 and 1969, Mohamoud served as an official at the Ministry of Planning and Coordination in Mogadishu during Somalia's early civilian administration. He was also the national Minister of Planning and Coordination (1969–1973), Minister of Commerce (1973–1978 and 1980–1982), and the Chairman of the National Economic Board (1978–1980) in the succeeding socialist government. Although a member of Siad Barre's cabinet for many years, he was believed to not be involved in any acts of violence and embezzlement. Therefore, allowing him to satisfy both the government and opposition at the time, paving way for his chairmanship of the Somali National Movement.

From 1984 to 1990, Mohamoud was the Chairman of the Somali National Movement (SNM), serving as the liberation group's longest-serving chairman.

Between 1993 and 1997, Mohamoud was a member of the House of Representatives of Somaliland. He also worked as the Somaliland Minister of Finance from 1997 to 1999, in which position he initiated a program of fiscal reform. Between 1999 and 2000, Mohamoud served as Somaliland's Minister of Planning and Coordination, a position from which he resigned in 2001.

=== Prominent seminars, symposia, conferences ===
During his years of public service, Mohamoud participated in a broad array of forums relating to a variety of developmental aspects of the world. He utilizing training programs under the patronage of United Nations (United Nations Institute for Training and Research (UNITAR), the United Nations Industrial Development Organization (UNIDO), and the United Nations Economic Commission for Africa (ECA)), as well as benefiting from a Leadership Grant organized by the African-American Institute that related to developmental fields, including visits to various regional state and federal governmental bodies throughout the United States.

Conferences attended

- United Nations, Organization of African Union (OAU)
- The Arab League
- Islamic and Non-Aligned Movement Conferences
- Somalian congress in diaspora on behalf of Somalian government

Leader of Somalian delegation

- UN Special Sessions, New York, NY
- OAU, Arab League, European Economic Commission (EEC), and the ministerial meetings of the Organisation of African, Caribbean and Pacific States (ACP).
- The 1976 Non-Aligned Conference, Lima, Peru
- United Nations Conference on Trade and Development (UNCTAD) in Nairobi, Kenya, 1977

=== Roles during the Somaliland Nationhood Government ===
==== 1982–1984: Chairman of Somali National Movement (SNM), UK Branch ====
During the earlier years of the SNM, Mohamoud established offices and organized SNM committees throughout Europe, North America, and the Arab World to raise international awareness of the liberation movement and the brutality of Somalia's Siyad Barre regime against its own people through presentations to international human rights groups, the press media, various European government bodies, including the British Parliament and the European Inter-Parliamentary Union, and relevant organizations in the Arab and Islamic world.

To further accomplish this, Mohamoud embarked on a program of recruitment of important personalities and groups in southern Somalia to join the SNM movement—a 1982 through 1991 Somali liberation faction founded and led predominantly by Isaaq members to protect the national interests of the Somalilanders against the oppressive Siyad Barre regime. Having successfully toppled the Siyad Barre regime in 1991, the SNM had been pivotal in reconstituting the Republic of Somaliland that on 1 July 1960, united with Somalia. Presently, Somaliland is a sovereign democratic country, but is internationally recognized as an autonomous region of Somalia.

==== 1984–1990: Chairman of Somali National Movement (SNM) ====
During the following years Mohamoud would become the SNM's longest-serving Chairman, in command throughout the most tumultuous, expansive, and decisive period of the liberation movement. In 1984, the SNM was in its infancy, having been established only two years earlier. Its most momentous events occurred in October 1984 with the first major, simultaneous, and coordinated invasion of the SNM troops into the mountainous regions of Somaliland, and its major expansion of SNM fronts in the southern and northwest regions of Awdal and the Northwest.

In 1986, an accord negotiated in Jabuuti between the Siyad Barre regime of Somalia and Mengistu Haile Mariam of Ethiopia to end the support of the respective rebellions against their regimes had entailed the effective dismemberment of the SNM. Having lost its Ethiopian sanctuary, as a consequence of this agreement, in May 1988, the SNM waged an invasion of the Togdheer and Northwest regions of Somaliland. With this secretly planned attack—a surprise to both Siyad Barre and Mingeste Haile Miriam regimes – SNM fighters easily took Burao (Burco) and Hargeisa (Hargeysa) cities. Although the SNM was eventually pushed out of the two cities, the surprise attack lead to the downfall of the Siyad Barre regime. The result was the peaceful transfer of power at the 1990 SNM Congress, which survives to the present day.

==== 1990–1996: Re-establishing Somaliland's sovereignty ====
While attending the Congress of Somaliland (Burao, May 1991), Mohamoud acted as a key player in re-establishing Somaliland's sovereignty as an independent state. In 1992, he initiated, and then organized, the famous Forum for Peace that generated a cease-fire agreement between the warring parties in the so-called Xarbal Aqnaam War in the port city Berbera and its environs. From 1993 through 1996, he would act as a Member of Somaliland House of Representatives. During this time, in 1996, he initiated a reconciliation movement that brought about an end to the internal conflict at Beer – 18 miles southeast of Burao (Togdheer Region), where a formal agreement of cessation of hostilities and an exchange of prisoners would be finalized.

==== 1997–1999: Minister of Finance ====
In 1997, Mohamoud had change roles, becoming the Minister of Finance for Somaliland devising and implementing a viable solution to stem out the runaway inflation threatening the economy of Somaliland. Further, shifting focus to the military, he sought to resolve the vexing problem of rationed supplies to the armed forces and begun to initiate a program for fiscal reform.

==== 1999–2000: Minister of Planning and Coordination ====
Changing roles once more, Mohamoud began to act as the Minister of Planning and Coordination for Somaliland, working to establish mechanisms for the coordination of aid programs between the government and foreign-aid donors. He initiated the formulation of a three-year development plan, organized a first of its kind and well-attended international conference on aid for Somaliland held in Hargeisa, attended and addressed the Somalia Aid Coordination Body (SACB) in Nairobi, Kenya – as the first-ever Somaliland Government Minister to do so, and lead a Somaliland government delegation that met with the World Bank and International Monetary Fund (IMF) representatives in Nairobi, Kenya.

==== 2000–2002: Mediator and various other roles ====
During the period of working with Somaliland's 2nd president, President Mohamed Haji Ibrahim Egal, Mohamoud played important and decisive roles as a mediator in preventing crisis with respect to incidents relating to the relationship between Djibouti and Somaliland, Somaliland and Ethiopia, SNM veterans and the Egal administration, and between the Somaliland House of Representatives and the Egal government. He would spend, however, a period overseas, delivering speeches and addressing communities of the Somaliland diaspora in Europe and the United States raising awareness on the achievements and developments of the county. Upon his return to Somaliland he immediately mounted a campaign toward the resolution of a looming national crisis between the Egal administration and its political opponents, a crisis which came close to starting afresh a new round of internal conflict.

==== 2002–2010: Founder and chairman of the Kulmiye Party and its presidential candidate ====
The youngest political organization in the country, the Kulmiye Party was established in early 2002 with a focus on conveying the campaign's platform to the countryside and rural regions. Notably, Mohamoud pursued a no smear campaign policy toward other political parties, thus conducting a peaceful election, while applauding public education on the merits of the multi-party system and the democratic process. However, Mohamoud lost the election by a mere 80 votes to President Dahir Rayaale Kahin.

Despite this setback, Mohamoud would be a supporting for the women's voices in Somaliland, as the Kulmiye Party was the only party to appoint a woman as vice-chair. During the next elections, Mohamoud was rewarded by garnering the largest national votes, only less than the total votes the incumbent party obtained during the previous presidential election. Through his stewardship, the Kulmiye Party has grown to be the largest party in Somaliland. Despite the ruling party's continuous hold to power after its term expired, and its unwillingness to hold free and fair elections, Mohamoud continued to pursue political change through the democratic process by working closely with traditional elders and the international community, whose interest is peace and stability in the Horn of Africa. Thus, when he ran as the Kulmiye Party candidate for president he was able to defeat incumbent President Dahir Rayaale Kahin of the United Peoples' Democratic Party (UDUB) in the 2010 presidential election.

==== 2010–2017: Fourth president of the Republic of Somaliland ====
Mohamed's term ended with the presidential election of 13 November 2017, which had been delayed from 28 March 2017. A snapshot of some of the salient achievements of the Silanyo Administration are depicted in the next section.

== President of Somaliland ==
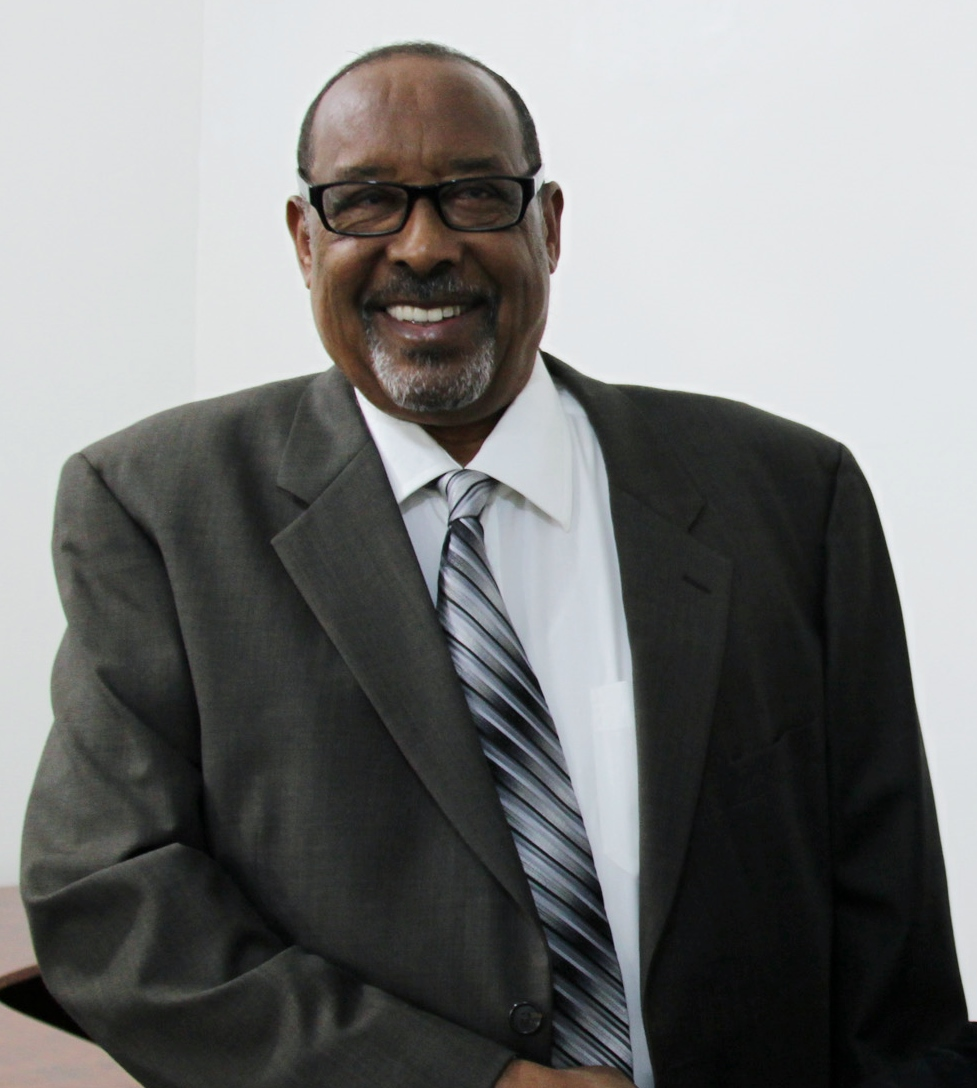
Mohamoud in 2011

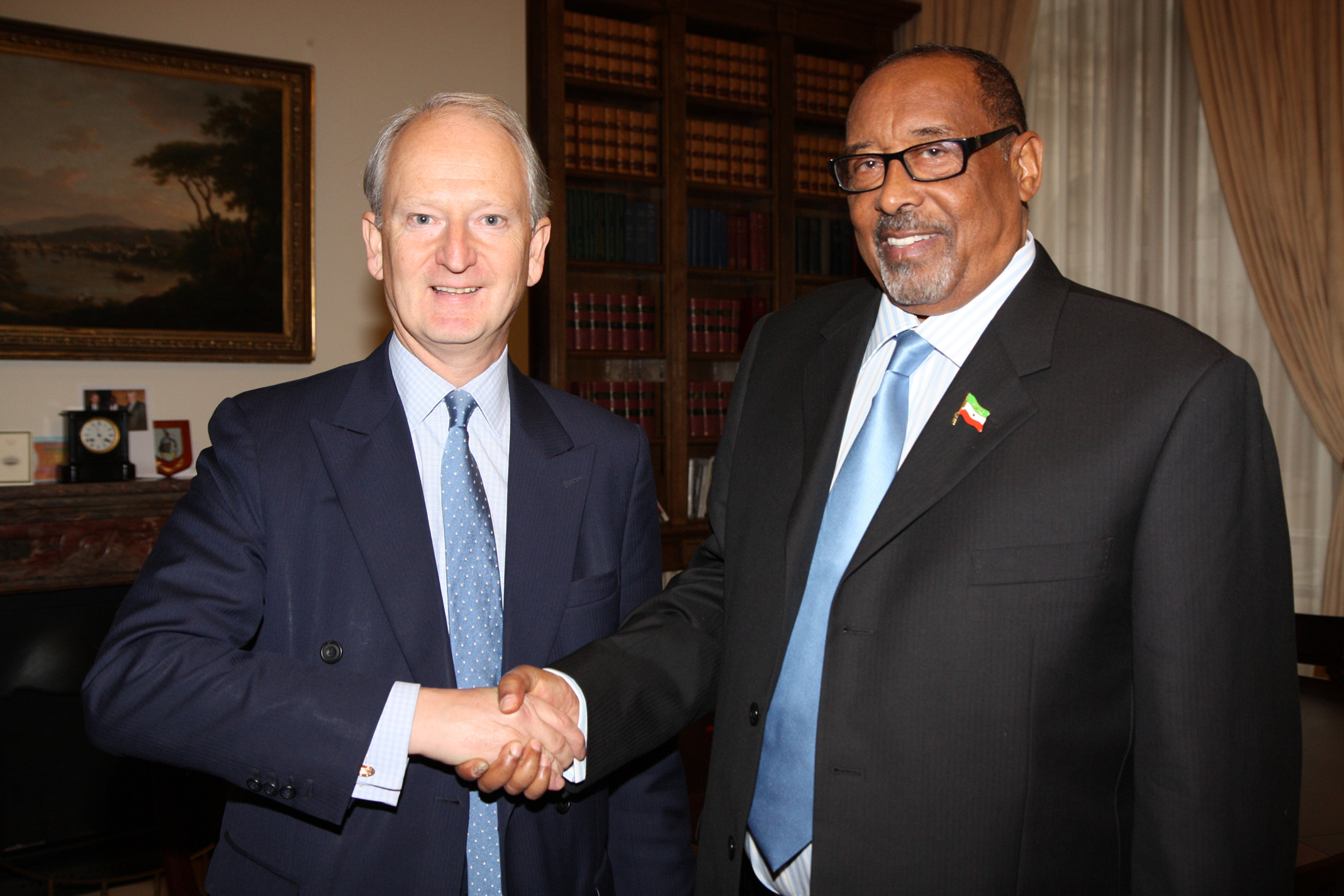
Mohamoud with Henry Bellingham in 2011

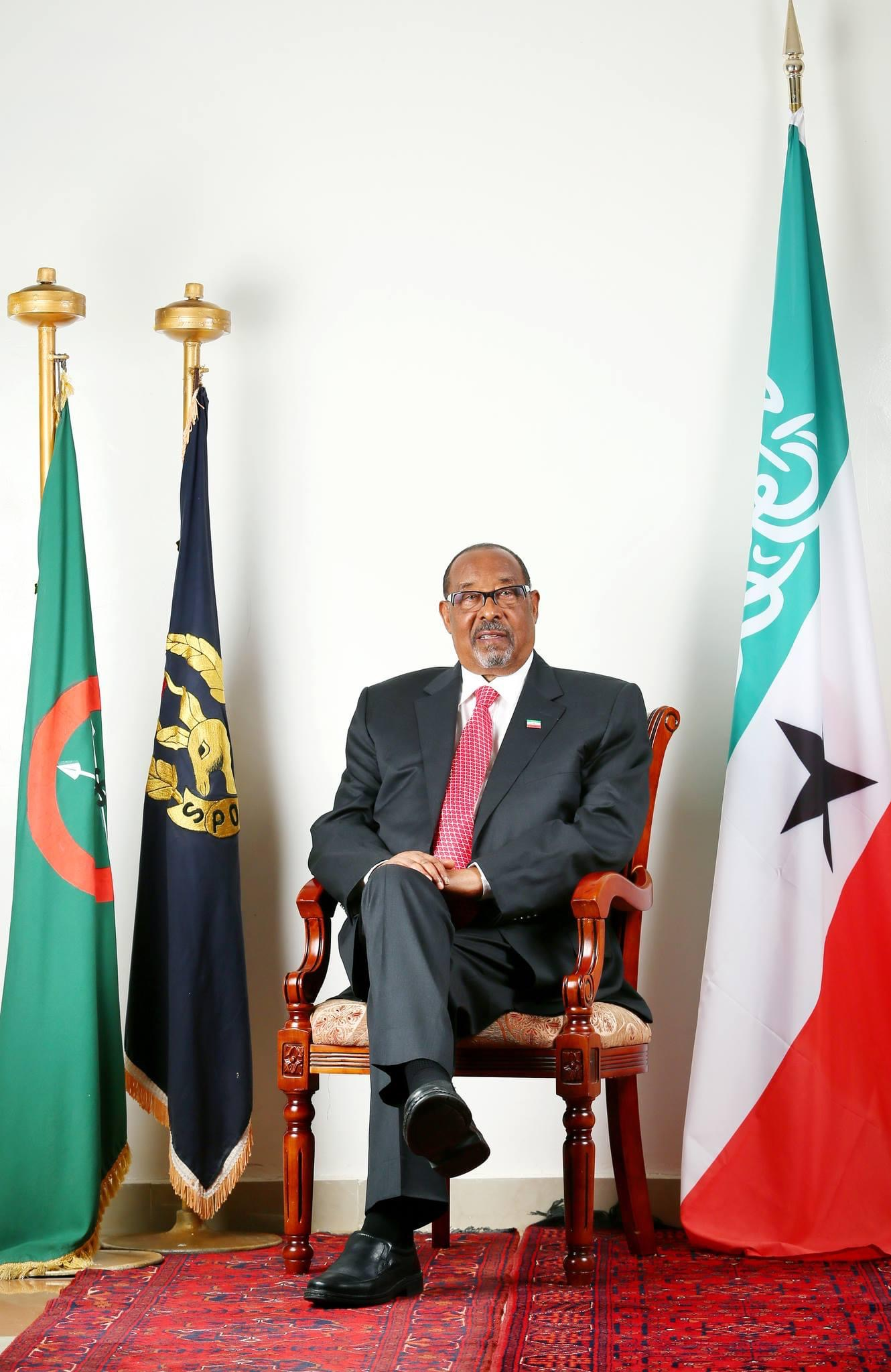
Mohamoud in 2013

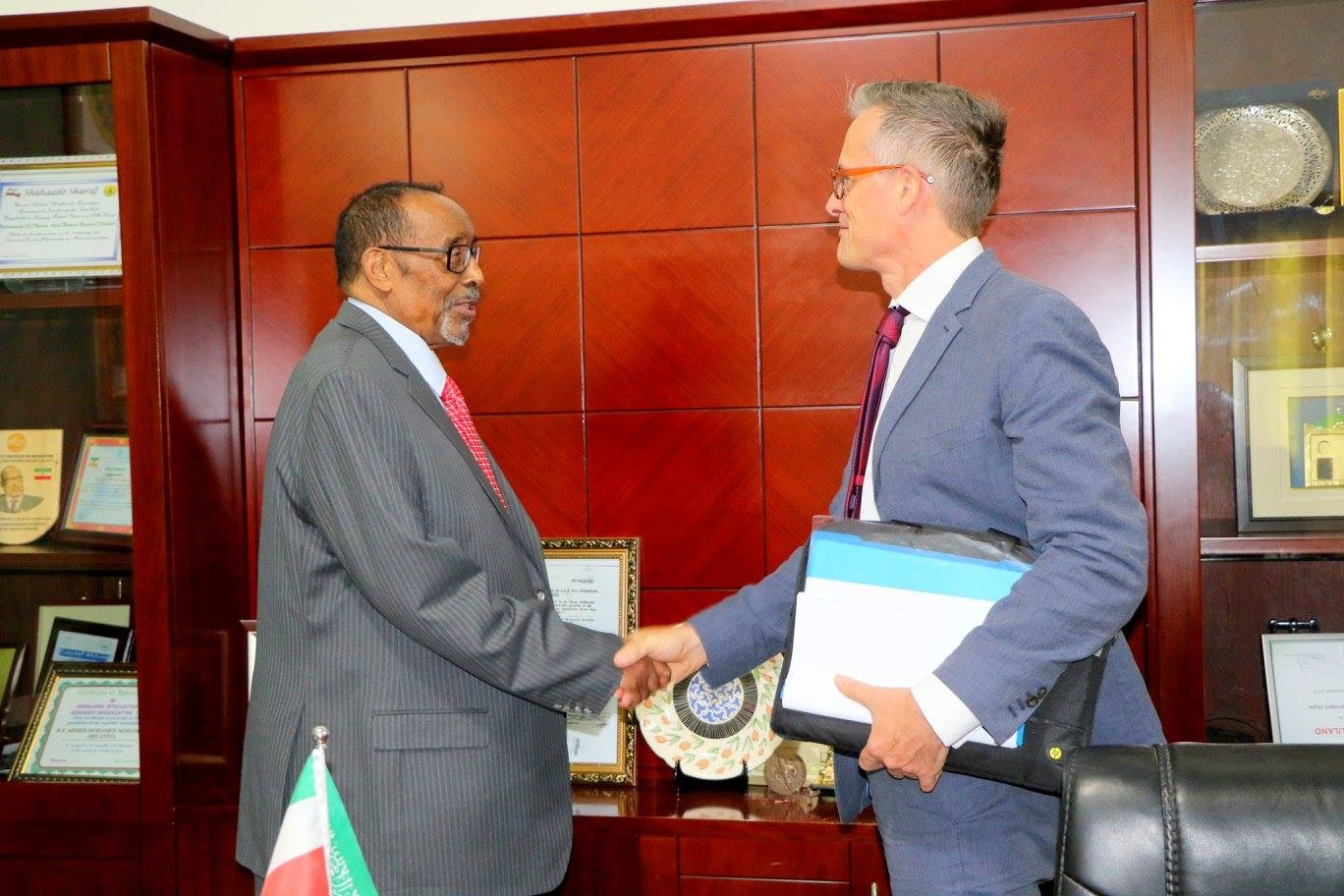
Mohamoud with David Concar in 2017

=== The Silanyo administration currency stabilization ===
One of the first policy implementations of the administration was the introduction of the Somaliland Shilling to the entire country. Prior to this time, the old Somalia Shillings were honoured in the eastern regions of the country. In 2011, President Silanyo issued an executive order, and passed by Parliament, making the Somaliland Shilling the legal tender of the country.

=== Major infrastructure improvements ===
Construction of offices for many of the country's twenty-four ministries, since the 1991 government ministries were housed in ill-suited offices built in a different era by the British colonial administration for fewer administrative departments. The Silanyo Administration budgeted and implemented construction of offices for many of the ministries that were in inadequate facilities.

The administration not only repaired or rebuilt roads connecting major towns, but also built roads leading to small towns in the country side. Furthermore, the Administration encouraged and helped partially fund community based road construction. More importantly however, the government started building a 240-mile (384 km.) tarmac road linking Burao (Burco) City to the provincial town of Erigavo (Ceerigaabo), the capital of Sanaag Region in the east of the country.

As part of the infrastructure improvement, the administration enlarged and enhanced security of Egal International Airport, in Hargeisa and Berbera Airport.

Enacted legislation that made primary education free.

Implemented new rank and salary systems for the Somaliland Armed Forces, the Somaliland Police, and the Custodial Corps.

=== Water development program ===
Because there are no perennial rivers and rainfall is unreliable, water is a highly precious commodity in Somaliland. Water supply systems throughout the country are, therefore, dependent on underground sources. Cognizant of the recurring droughts and inadequate water supply systems of cities and towns, the Silanyo Administration introduced a water development policy. The central policy of the Administration's water development program is, inter alia, drilling bore holes and damming dry – river beds that drain water into the sea during the two rainy seasons.

In order to realize such policy achievements, the administration embarked on expanding, through additional drilling, the water supply systems of the six major towns: Hargeisa, Borama, Berbera, Burao, Las Anod, and Erigavo.

In particular, to alleviate the chronic water shortage in the capital city, Hargeisa, the administration drilled more wells and installed bigger and rust resistant pipe lines in the Geed Deeble water works and is damming the Humboweyne (Xumboweyne) dry river, north east of Hargeisa.

The administration intends to establish a grid work of wells throughout the country as well as damming as many of the numerous dry-bed rivers emanating from Golis Range that otherwise empty into the sea.

=== Joint venture with Dubai Port World (D P World) for the management of Berbera Port ===
The administration has entered into a joint venture agreement with Dubai Port World (DP World) whereby D.P World for thirty years takes over the management of Berbera Port; builds a 400-meter new terminal with a container section, Free Trade Zone, and rehabilitates the old port.

In addition, the United Arab Emirates has agreed to build a 250 km (156 mile) road connecting Berbera and the border town of Wajaale.

These major agreements enhance the capacity of the port and employment opportunities, but more importantly enable trade to flourish between Somaliland and Ethiopia's population of 102 million.

== Death ==
According to his family, Ahmed Mohamed Mohamoud died at the age of 86 in Hargeisa on 15 November 2024, after a long illness.

Political offices
Preceded by Dahir Riyale Kahin	President of Somaliland; 2010–2017	Succeeded by Muse Bihi Abdi
