= Hinda Jama Hersi =

Somali politician

Hinda Jama Hersi هندا جامع حيرسي
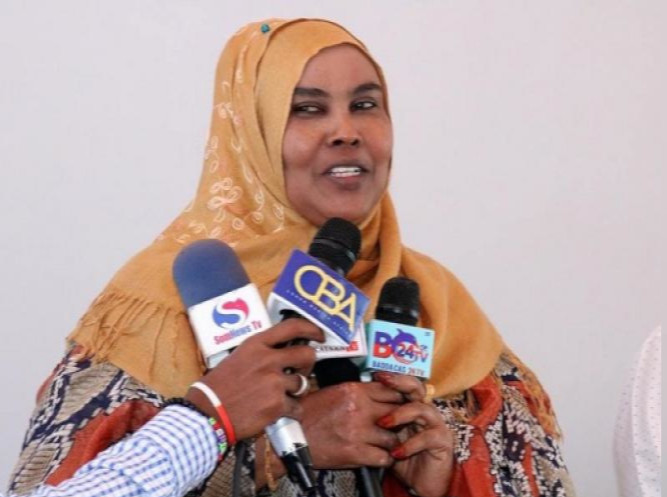

Minister of Employment, Social and Family Affairs
- In office 14 December 2017 – January 2021
- President: Muse Bihi Abdi
- Preceded by: Mohamed Abdillahi Obsiyeh
- Succeeded by: Mustafe Mohamoud Ali

Personal details
- Party: Peace, Unity, and Development Party

Hinda Jama Hersi Ganni (Somali: Hinda Jaamac Xirsi Gaanni) is a Somali politician served as the Minister of Employment, Social and Family Affairs of Somaliland.

== Biography ==
Hinda Jama Hirsi Gaani is from the eastern part of Burao District and belongs to the Habr Je'lo sub clan of the Isaaq clan.

Hinda has been described in media analyses of ministers' CVs as not having completed high school.

By at least December 2013, Hinda was in a position to appear and speak at Waddani party rallies. By at least June 2015, she held the Waddani party post responsible for labour and social affairs.

=== Waddani to Kulmiye ===
In February 2017, a Waddani splinter group led by Ahmed Mumin Seed agreed to merge with the ruling Kulmiye party, and Hinda aligned herself with that move.

=== Minister of Employment, Social and Family Affairs ===
In December 2017, newly elected President Muse Bihi Abdi announced his cabinet and appointed Hinda as Minister of Employment, Social and Family Affairs.

In January 2018, Somaliland’s Civil Service Commission conducted examinations for numerous young applicants with the aim of recruiting 21 people for a government project and subsequently published the list of successful candidates. Speaking at the event, Hinda praised the commission’s fair and transparent procedures and stated that the government would intensify its efforts to create employment opportunities for youth, emphasizing that expanding youth employment was a top priority for the current administration.

In January 2018, against the backdrop of rising unemployment among university graduates in Somaliland, Hinda stated that the government was conducting a survey of foreign workers employed by United Nations agencies, international humanitarian organizations, and private companies, and made it clear that jobs which can be performed by Somaliland citizens should not be occupied by foreigners.

In August 2018, speaking at a national conference on youth job creation held in Hargeisa, Hinda said the meeting aimed to create jobs for young people attempting migration and dangerous journeys. She added that her ministry was advancing a set of reforms and frameworks, including an employment-creation policy, a vocational training policy, a national internship program, a pension/retirement scheme, and updates to the civil service law, and she cited as an example a Kuwait-based organization in Hargeisa that trains youth—including orphans—in practical skills that can help them secure jobs after completing their studies.

In December 2018, Hinda, alongside the Minister of Youth and Sports and the Minister of Justice, jointly launched a two-day national conference on the rights of the child. Hinda stated that since assuming her post, her ministry had made progress in line with Somaliland’s national plan, including advancing access to education and healthcare for children across the country.

In January 2019, Hinda was reported as saying that Somaliland’s media broadcast nothing that was beneficial to society.

In June 2019, amid allegations that funds from a World Bank–financed Somaliland workforce reform and capacity-building project had been misappropriated, Hinda held a press briefing and said the money was administered through accounts managed between the World Bank and Somaliland’s Ministry of Finance, with disbursements requested via scheduled budget vouchers, leaving no room for embezzlement.

In October 2019, Hinda launched a program called "UP SHIFTING" to support local youth’s entrepreneurial talent and connect them to the local market and beyond.

In April 2020, as part of Somaliland’s response to the COVID-19 outbreak and the urgent need to protect people with limited access to basic services, Hinda announced that her ministry would support vulnerable groups—such as street sleepers and homeless people, older persons, persons with disabilities, and low-income households—through measures including temporary accommodation, provision of essential supplies, and distribution of hygiene items.

In April 2020, speaking about the damage caused by heavy rains in the Togdheer region, Hinda appealed to residents to support impoverished flood-affected families, especially by helping one another provide basic household necessities.

In January 2021, President Muse Bihi Abdi dismissed Hinda from her post as Minister of Employment, Social Affairs and Family Affairs, and appointed Mustafe Mohamoud Ali Bile as her replacement. After her dismissal, Hinda strongly rejected social-media rumors about the reason for her removal—claims that she had quarreled with President Muse Bihi Abdi, that there had been a scandal, or that the president had used violence—calling them impossible and shameful fabrications. She said she had not come to office through the backing of sultans or other powerbrokers, nor through merchants or personal connections, but because the president himself selected her and appointed her among his earliest ministers, and she repeatedly expressed gratitude to him. As further grounds for rejecting the rumors, she said the president is a man of decorum who would not argue with a female minister.

=== Post-ministerial career ===
In June 2021, after losing the Burao mayoral race, former mayor Mohamed Cabdiraxmaan Muraad told the media that the Waddani party did not want residents of eastern Burao to become mayor. His remarks were criticized as divisive and clanist. In response, Hinda made statements defending him, and she was criticized for making clan-based remarks seen as fueling division in Somaliland.

In September 2021, while Hinda was conducting mineral prospecting in Fiqi Ayuub in the Togdheer region, a dispute with local residents led to gunfire being opened on her vehicle, and a member of her security detail who was accompanying her was injured.

== See also ==
- Ministry of Employment, Social and Family Affairs (Somaliland)
- Politics of Somaliland
- List of Somaliland politicians

Political offices
Preceded by Mohamed Abdillahi Obsiyeh	Minister of Employment, Social and Family Affairs; 2017–January 2021	Next: Mustafe Mohamoud Ali
