= Saleban Warsame Guled =

Somali politician, former Minister of Justice of Somaliland

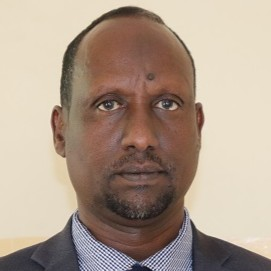

Minister of Justice of Somaliland
- In office January 2021 – December 2024
- President: Muse Bihi Abdi
- Preceded by: Mustafe Mohamoud Ali
- Succeeded by: Yonis Ahmed Yonis Muhammed

Deputy Minister of Defence
- In office July 2010 – April 2011
- President: Ahmed Mohamed Mohamoud (Silanyo)

Personal details
- Occupation: Politician

Saleban Warsame Guled (Somali: Saleebaan Warsame Guuleed) is a Somali politician who has served in various governmental roles in Somaliland, including Deputy Minister of Defence, member of the National Human Rights Commission, and Minister of Justice.

== Biography ==
=== Interior ministry staff ===
In July 2002, a series of discussions on the decentralization of government institutions was held in the capital, Hargeisa, where Saleban Warsame Guled participated in his capacity as a staff member of the Ministry of Interior.

=== Deputy Defence Minister ===
In July 2010, President Ahmed Mohamed Mohamoud “Silanyo” announced his new cabinet, appointing Ahmed Haji Ali Adami as Minister of Defence and naming Saleban Warsame Guled and Ahmed Mohamed Filanwaa as deputy ministers of defence.

=== Human Rights Commission ===
In April 2011, President Silanyo appointed seven human rights commissioners under the Human Rights Commission Act adopted in 2010, naming Saleban Warsame Guled as one of the members.

In June 2014, the National Human Rights Commission visited Las Anod in the Sool region as part of a tour to assess the human rights situation in different parts of Somaliland.

In July 2018, President Muse Bihi Abdi appointed a seven-member human rights commission, naming Saleban Warsame Guled as one of its members.

In July 2020, Suldaan Abdillahi Suldaan Ali, the supreme suldaan of the Habr Je'lo clan, appealed to two closely related clans in the Beeyo Macaan area of the Sahil region to end their fighting, a call that was made at a gathering also attended by Mustafe Mohamoud Ali.

Under Somaliland's National Human Rights Commission Act (Law No. 39/2010), which establishes the National Human Rights Commission as an independent statutory body separate from the executive branch, commissioners cannot concurrently serve as government ministers. In 2021, after Saleeban Warsame Guled left his position as a commissioner on the National Human Rights Commission, President Muse Bihi Abdi appointed Jama Haji Ahmed as his replacement, a move that some legal commentators criticised as contrary to Law No. 39/2010 (the Human Rights Commission Act).

=== Justice Minister ===
On 10 January 2021, President Muse Bihi Abdi carried out a cabinet reshuffle and appointed Saleban Warsame Guled as Minister of Justice.

On 19 January 2021, Saleban Warsame Guled received a formal handover from former Minister of Justice Mustafe Mohamoud Ali.

In March 2021, Minister of Justice Saleban Warsame Guled announced that all visits to inmates in the country’s fourteen prisons had been suspended to protect them from a resurgence of COVID-19.

In November 2021, President Muse Bihi Abdi met with Suldaan Abdillahi Suldaan Ali after the chief demanded the removal of Mohamed Kahin Ahmed and Hassan Mohammed Ali; the meeting was reportedly brokered by Minister of Justice Saleban Warsame Guled.

In September 2023, during the Las Anod conflict (2023–present), Somaliland deployed newly graduated army officers to Oog. Minister of Justice Saleban Warsame Guled visited the army base to welcome the recruits.

In August 2024, senior figures of the Kulmiye party held a meeting in Berbera, attended by Minister of Justice Saleban Warsame Guled alongside the Minister of Religious Affairs.

In December 2024, power changed hands in Somaliland as Waddani party leader Abdirahman Mohamed Abdullahi "Irro" became president, and he appointed Yonis Ahmed Yonis Muhammed as Minister of Justice in his new cabinet.
