= Isse Ahmed Yusuf =

Somali politician

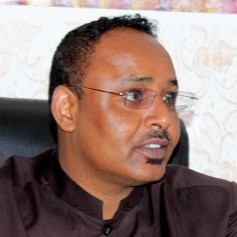

Minister of Defence
- In office 14 December 2017 – 31 March 2019
- President: Muse Bihi Abdi
- Preceded by: Ahmed Haji Ali Adami
- Succeeded by: Abdiqani Mohamoud Aateye

Isse Ahmed Yusuf (Somali: Ciise Axmed Yuusuf) is a politician from Somaliland who served as the Minister of Defence of Somaliland from December 2017 until his sacking in March 2019 following allegations of corruption.

== See also ==
- Politics of Somaliland
- Ministry of Defence (Somaliland)
- Cabinet of Somaliland

Political offices
Preceded by Ahmed Haji Ali Adami	Minister of Defence; 2016-2017	Succeeded by Abdiqani Mohamoud Aateye
