= Ali Omar Mohamed =

Somaliland politician

Ali Omar Mohamed علي عمر محمد
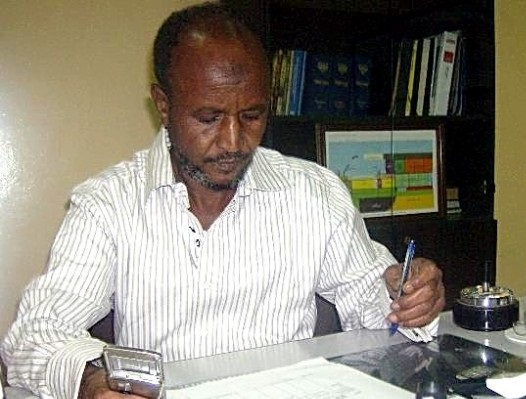

Manager of Berbera Port
- In office 28 October 1998 – 25 August 2010
- President: Dahir Riyale Kahin
- Preceded by: Mohamed Haji Yusuf
- Succeeded by: Ahmed Yusuf Dirir

Manager of Berbera Port
- In office 20 December 2011 – 20 August 2016
- President: Ahmed Mohamed Mohamoud
- Preceded by: Ahmed Yusuf Dirir
- Succeeded by: Ahmed Yusuf Dirir

Minister of Employment and Social Affairs
- In office January 2023 – December 2024
- President: Muse Bihi Abdi
- Preceded by: Mustafe Mohamoud Ali
- Succeeded by: Milgo Mohamed Elmi

Personal details
- Born: Berbera, Somaliland
- Education: Burao School of Technical

Ali Omar Mohamed (Somali: Cali Cumar Maxamed, Arabic: علي عمر محمد) also known as Ali Horhor (Cali Xoor Xoor) was a Berbera Port's longest serving manager.

== Biography ==
=== Manager of Berbera Port (1st term) ===
In the 1990s, Ali Omar Mohamed was appointed as the Manager of the Berbera Port during the administration of President Egal.

In October 2002, Ali Omar Mohamed, the manager of Berbera Port, faced public allegations of nepotism regarding port recruitment. A complainant alleged that despite passing a competitive exam for a manual labor position, they were dismissed after six weeks and replaced by a relative of the manager who had not participated in the examination process.

In August 2010, President Ahmed Mohamed Mohamud (Silanyo) dismissed Ali Omar Mohamed from the position of Manager of the Berbera Port. Ahmed Yusuf Dirir was named as his successor. Ali had previously supported Dirir's training in South Africa and appointed him as the chief accountant of Berbera Port, but their professional relationship deteriorated due to political differences and management disputes.

=== Manager of Berbera Port (2nd term) ===
On December 22, 2011, Ali Omar Mohamed took office as the manager of the Berbera Port in Somaliland, replacing Ahmed Yusuf Dirir. While the reasons for Ahmed Yusuf Dirir's dismissal were not officially disclosed, some reports suggested that corruption and mismanagement at Berbera Port, a strategically important commercial hub, were the causes. The appointment of Engineer Ali Omar Mohamed was widely welcomed in the city of Berbera.

In January 2012, the BBC World Service visited Somaliland for a program to introduce the country globally, interviewing various figures including Berbera Port manager Ali Omar Mohamed. Ali reported on the port's services, current activities, its impact on security in conflict regions, its role in national development, and future plans.

In December 2013, Ali Omar Mohamed faced allegations of political sycophancy after naming a newly built mosque at Berbera Port "Mujahid Silanyo" in honor of President Ahmed Mohamed Mohamud. Critics argued that Ali utilized public port funds for the project, making the dedication to the president inappropriate.

In March 2014, the Second Deputy Speaker of the Somaliland House of Representatives visited the Sahil region to open the House's second office; on this occasion, Ali Omar Mohamed was presented with a certificate of appreciation alongside the Governor of Sahil and others.

In May 2014, Ali Mohamed Yussuf, the third vice chairman of the UCID party, criticized the Kulmiye administration, stating that "Ali Mohamed Warancadde became a minister and Ali Horhor occupied the port."

In March 2016, Ali Omar Mohamed accompanied the President on a visit to Kuwait.

In May 2016, a signing took place for Somaliland to transfer Berbera Port to the UAE operating company DP World, but reports were made that there was a mystery in that the only signatory on the Somaliland side was the Minister of Foreign Affairs, and Ali Omar Mohamed, the General Manager of Berbera Port whom DP World had intended to be included, was not among the signatories. In July 2016, following the report, Ali Omar Mohamed stated that the port supported the President's policies and that the reported conflict between the two sides was propaganda.

In August 2016, Somaliland President Silanyo dismissed Ali Omar Mohamed from his position as Manager of the Berbera Port and appointed Ahmed Yusuf Dirir in his place. Ali’s removal followed nearly twenty years of service and was reportedly linked to his failure to suppress local opposition to the DP World investment deal.

=== Post-managerial career ===
In October 2016, reports were made that Ali Omar Mohamed would join the Waddani party, but he strongly denied this.

In October 2017, the Kulmiye party, led by presidential candidate Muse Bihi Abdi, visited Berbera for a presidential campaign rally, where Ali Omar Mohamed also delivered a supporting speech as a local representative.

=== Minister of Employment and Social Affairs ===
In January 2023, Somaliland President Muse Bihi Abdi appointed Ali Omar Mohamed as Minister of Employment and Social Affairs. However, on August 22, the Somaliland House of Representatives rejected Ali's appointment by a majority vote, with 30 members voting against, 6 in favor, and 9 abstaining. On September 30, a second vote of confidence for Ali Omar Mohamed was held in the House of Representatives, and he was approved with 73 votes in favor and zero abstentions or oppositions.

In October 2023, Ali Omar Mohamed, acting as the Minister of Employment, Social Affairs and Family, presided over the opening of a coordination forum for social welfare agencies in Hargeisa. During the event, Ali shared the Ministry's strategic framework for social development and reviewed collaborative goals for improving community care services across the country.

== See also ==
- Berbera Port
