= Ahmed Farah Adarre =

Somaliland politician

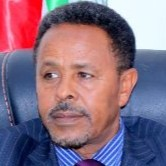

Minister of Justice of Somaliland
- In office October 2015 – 2017
- President: Ahmed Mohamed Mohamoud
- Preceded by: Hussein Ahmed Aideed
- Succeeded by: Abdiqani Mohamoud Ateye

Deputy Minister of Interior for Regional Administration
- In office February 2015 – October 2015

Chairman of the Somaliland Energy Commission
- In office July 2020 – November 2023
- President: Muse Bihi Abdi

Personal details
- Occupation: Politician

Ahmed Farah Adarre (Somali: Axmed Faarax Cadare) is a Somaliland politician who has served in several senior government positions, including Minister of Justice, Deputy Minister of Interior, and Chairman of the Somaliland Energy Commission.

== Biography ==
=== Deputy Interior Minister ===
In February 2015, President Ahmed Mohamed Mohamoud “Silanyo” carried out a cabinet reshuffle and appointed Ahmed Farah Adarre as Deputy Minister of Interior for Regional Administration.

=== Justice Minister ===
In October 2015, President Silanyo appointed successors to the ministers who had resigned, naming Ahmed Farah Adarre, formerly Deputy Minister of Interior for Local Government, as Minister of Justice.

In June 2016, Interior Minister Ali Mohamed Warancadde led a large delegation to Burco, where they held meetings with traditional leaders, intellectuals and various officials from the Jama Dubad area, with Ahmed Farah Adarre also participating as a member of the delegation.

In July 2017, Minister of Justice Ahmed Farah Adarre responded to concerns that some inmates might be held in prison beyond the expiry of their sentences or without having been sentenced, stating that no prisoners were being detained without legal grounds and that the authorities were working to maintain inmates’ health and provide them with vocational skills.

In August 2017, Justice Minister Ahmed Farah Adarre strongly warned that party support should not be based on clan loyalties or the personal glorification of party leaders.

=== Party's congress ===
In March 2020, President Muse Bihi Abdi, who also chairs the Kulmiye Party, announced the members of the organizing committee for the party’s fourth national congress, selecting Ahmed Farah Adarre as one of the fourteen members.

=== Energy Commission Chairman ===
In July 2020, President Muse Bihi Abdi appointed seven members to the Somaliland Energy Commission, naming Ahmed Farah Adarre as its chairman.

In 2021, Energy Commission Chairman Ahmed Farah Adarre, together with Minister of Energy and Minerals Abdillahi Abdi Farah, inspected the Berbera Port and Berbera energy regeneration project.

In June 2022, Energy Commission Chairman Ahmed Farah Adarre announced that Somaliland’s electricity tariffs for the month of May would remain unchanged.

In June 2022, as global crude oil prices surged following Russia’s invasion of Ukraine, electricity companies in Somaliland announced that they would introduce nightly power cuts from 11 p.m. to 4 a.m. in major cities including the capital Hargeisa. Energy Commission Chairman Ahmed Farah Adarre strongly opposed an announced decision to cut off electricity supply during the night.

In September 2022, Energy Commission Chairman Ahmed Farah Adarre stated that access to energy is the key to economic growth and that Somaliland is developing a regulatory system to provide affordable and safe energy.

In November 2023, President Muse Bihi Abdi dismissed Energy Commission Chairman Ahmed Farah Adarre from his position.

Political offices
Preceded by Hussein Ahmed Aideed	Minister of Justice; 2015–2017	Succeeded by Abdiqani Mohamoud Ateye
