= Ahmed Hassan Ali =

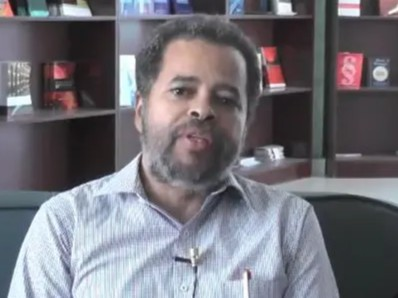

Minister of Justice of Somaliland
- In office July 2003 – March 2010
- Preceded by: Abdihamid Garad Jama
- Succeeded by: Adan Ahmed Elmi

Ahmed Hassan Ali (Somali: Axmed Xasan Cali Libaax), also known as Asowe (Casoowe), is a Somaliland politician who served as minister of justice between 2003 and 2010.

== Biography ==
Asowe is from Sool region.

=== Justice minister ===
In July 2003, President Dahir Riyale Kahin formed his second cabinet, appointing eighteen ministers, five ministers of state and eleven deputy ministers, including Asowe as Minister of Justice.

In October 2007, Somaliland's minister of justice Asowe, minister of public works Said Sulub Mohamed, and minister of parliament cooperation Abdi Hassan Buni met in Oog with former Puntland interior and security minister Ahmed Abdi Mohamed (Habsade), who had been reported to support pro-Somaliland militias that helped shift Las Anod, previously under de facto Puntland control, toward Somaliland's effective authority.

In January 2008, Asowe accompanied President Dahir Riyale Kahin on his visit to the United States.

=== Health minister ===
In March 2010, President Dahir Riyale Kahin carried out a partial cabinet reshuffle in which Justice Minister Ahmed Ali Casowe was transferred to the post of Minister of Health and Labour.

=== Silanyo administration ===
In July 2010, as his departure from office in the context of the power transfer to President-elect Ahmed Mohamed Mohamoud "Silanyo" had become almost certain, Asowe was reported to be planning, in coordination with other cabinet ministers, to leave the country and settle abroad before formally stepping down.

On 28 July 2010, newly elected President Ahmed Mohamed Mohamoud "Silanyo" announced his cabinet appointments and named Dr. Hussein Mohamed Mohamoud (Hog) as Minister of Health.

In May 2016, Asowe held a meeting with President Ahmed Mohamed Mohamoud "Silanyo", at a time when there were rumours that the former justice minister would return to government as a member of Silanyo's cabinet.

In February 2017, negotiations began between Somaliland and Khatumo State president Ali Khalif Galaydh, who had sought independence from Somaliland, and Asowe accompanied the talks as one of the representatives of the Somaliland delegation.

In June 2019, Mohamed Ahmed Dhakool was arrested by the Somaliland government after he strongly opposed the 18 May independence celebrations. His clansman Asowe apologized on behalf of their community, stating that 18 May is a day of great value for Somaliland.

=== Member of Parliament ===
In June 2021, Asowe stood as a Kulmiye Party candidate in the Sool constituency and was elected as one of the twelve local councillors for the region.

In January 2023, a large conference aimed at strengthening security in Las Anod was convened under the chairmanship of Somaliland Interior Minister Mohamed Kahin Ahmed, and Asowe attended the meeting as one of the participating officials.
