= Ilhan Mahamed Jama =

Somaliland politician

Ilhan Mohamed Jama
- Ilhaan Maxamed Jaamac
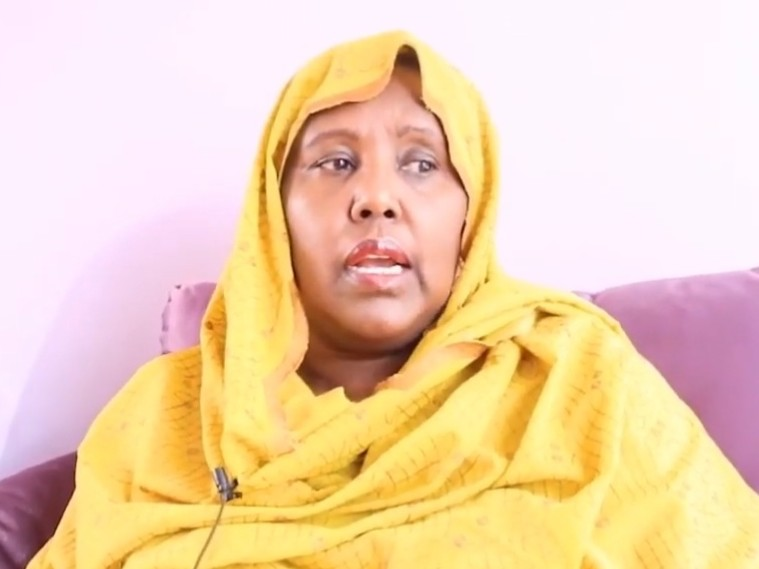

Minister of Labour and Social Affairs of Somaliland
- In office July 2010 – March 2013
- President: Ahmed Mohamed Mohamud

Personal details
- Party: Kulmiye

Ilhan Mohamed Jama (Somali: Ilhaan Maxamed Jaamac) is a Somali politician who served as the Minister of Labour and Social Affairs of Somaliland.

== Career ==
Ilhan is from the Sanaag region and belongs to the Habr Je'lo sub-clan of the Isaaq clan.

In October 2009, Ilhan was nominated by the opposition Kulmiye Party to serve as a member of the National Electoral Commission. She was the only woman among the nominees for the new commission. However, President Dahir Riyale Kahin rejected her nomination three times, leading Ilhan to announce her resignation from the position to allow the party to move forward with a different candidate.

In May 2010, Ilhan was recognized as a prominent member of the Kulmiye Party. During a party event, it was noted that she had been invited by United States President Barack Obama to attend a summit in the United States.

=== Ministry of Labour ===
In July 2010, Ilhan was appointed as the Minister of Labour and Social Affairs by President Ahmed Mohamed Mohamud.

In March 2011, she was a member of a high-level Somaliland delegation that traveled to Nairobi to meet with representatives of the United Nations Security Council. The discussions focused on regional security, including the fight against piracy and terrorism in the Horn of Africa.

In November 2011, she attended the 10th Annual Horn of Africa Conference in Lund, Sweden. During the conference, she delivered a presentation on the role of women in promoting peace and development, noting the increasing presence of women in Somaliland's regional and national leadership roles.

In November 2011, acting as the Minister of Labour and Social Affairs, Ilhan addressed the issue of youth unemployment and the resulting migration of young people from Somaliland. She issued a directive to both local and international employers within the country to prioritize the hiring of Somaliland citizens.

In March 2013, she concluded her tenure as the Minister of Labour and Social Affairs following a major cabinet reshuffle conducted by President Ahmed Mohamed Mohamud.

=== Post-ministerial career ===
In May 2014, Ilhan was appointed as a member of the executive committee (Somali: Guddida Fulinta) of the Kulmiye Party. She was included in a 36-member list announced by party chairman Muse Bihi Abdi, which notably excluded President Silanyo and several cabinet ministers amid internal leadership disputes within the party.

In October 2017, Ilhan was appointed as a member of the Kulmiye Party's election campaign committee for the Sanaag region. The committee was established by party chairman and presidential candidate Muse Bihi Abdi to coordinate campaign activities for the 2017 Somaliland presidential election.

In October 2020, during the Kulmiye Party convention, a reshuffle of the party's Central Council (Somali: Golaha Dhexe) was conducted. It was reported that former President Ahmed Mohamed Mohamud "Silanyo", along with Ilhan and other prominent figures from the previous administration, were excluded from the newly approved leadership lists.

== See also ==
- Cabinet of Somaliland
- Politics of Somaliland
