= State Printing Agency =

State publisher of Somaliland

Republic of Somaliland National Printing Agency
- Madbacadda Qaranka (NPA)
- Coat of arms of Somaliland

Agency overview
- Formed: 1997
- Jurisdiction: Republic of Somaliland
- Headquarters: Hargeisa
- Agency executive: Abdirahman Ibrahim Adem(Abees), Manager

The National Printing Agency (NPA; Somali: Madbacadda Qaranka) is a Somaliland government agency established in 1997 by President Mohamed Haji Ibrahim Egal. It is responsible for publishing official documents of the various government agencies of Somaliland. The Manager who serves as the head of the SPA, is appointed by the President. The General Manager is Abdirahman Ibrahim Adem(Abees).

== See also ==
- Ali Said Raygal
- Politics of Somaliland
- Media of Somaliland

General Manager of Somaliland National Printing Agency: Abdirahman Ibrahim Aadam(Abees).
