= Ministry of Defence (Somaliland) =

Government ministry of Somaliland

Republic of Somaliland Ministry of Defence
- Wasaarada Gaashaandhigga
- Coat of arms of Somaliland

Ministry overview
- Formed: 1991; 35 years ago
- Jurisdiction: Somaliland
- Headquarters: Hargeisa, Maroodi Jeh (Somaliland)
- Minister responsible: Mohamed Yusuf Ali Ahmed, Minister
- Child Ministry: Somaliland Armed Forces
- Website: mod.govsomaliland.org

The Ministry of Defence of the Republic of Somaliland (MoD) (Somali: Wasaaradda Gaashaandhigga Somaliland; Arabic: وزارة الدفاع) is a department of the Government of Somaliland responsible for the Somaliland Armed Forces and implementing the defence policy set by Government of Somaliland. The Defence Minister is a member of the Somaliland cabinet and the head of the Ministry of Defence. In this role, they exercise day-to-day administrative and operational authority over the armed forces. The current Minister of Defence is Mohamed Yusuf Ali Ahmed.

== History ==
In 1914, the Somaliland Camel Corps was formed in the British Somaliland protectorate and saw service before, during, and after the Italian invasion of the territory during World War II.

== Army ==
=== Personnel ===
The sub of Somaliland army in Somaliland has long operated without a formal rank structure. However, in December 2012, Somaliland defence ministry announced that a chain of command had been developed and would be implemented by January 2013.

== Ministers of Defence ==
| Image | Minister | Term start | Term end |
|---|---|---|---|
| | Rashid Hagi Abdillahi | | May 1999 |
| | Omar Mohamed Nimale | May 1999 | |
| | Ahmed Ali | | |
| | Ismael Umar Ahmed (Boos) | | |
| | Abdillahi Ali Ibrahim | | 15 August 2009 |
| | Suleiman Warsame Guled | 15 August 2009 | |
| | Ahmed Haji Ali Adami | 27 July 2010 | 14 December 2017 |
| | Isse Ahmed Yusuf | 14 December 2017 | 31 March 2019 |
| | Abdiqani Mohamoud Aateye | 31 March 2019 | March 2024 |
| | Dr Rooble Abdi Elmi | March 2024 | December 2024 |
| | Mohamed Yusuf Ali Ahmed (Ilkacase) | December 2024 | Incumbent |

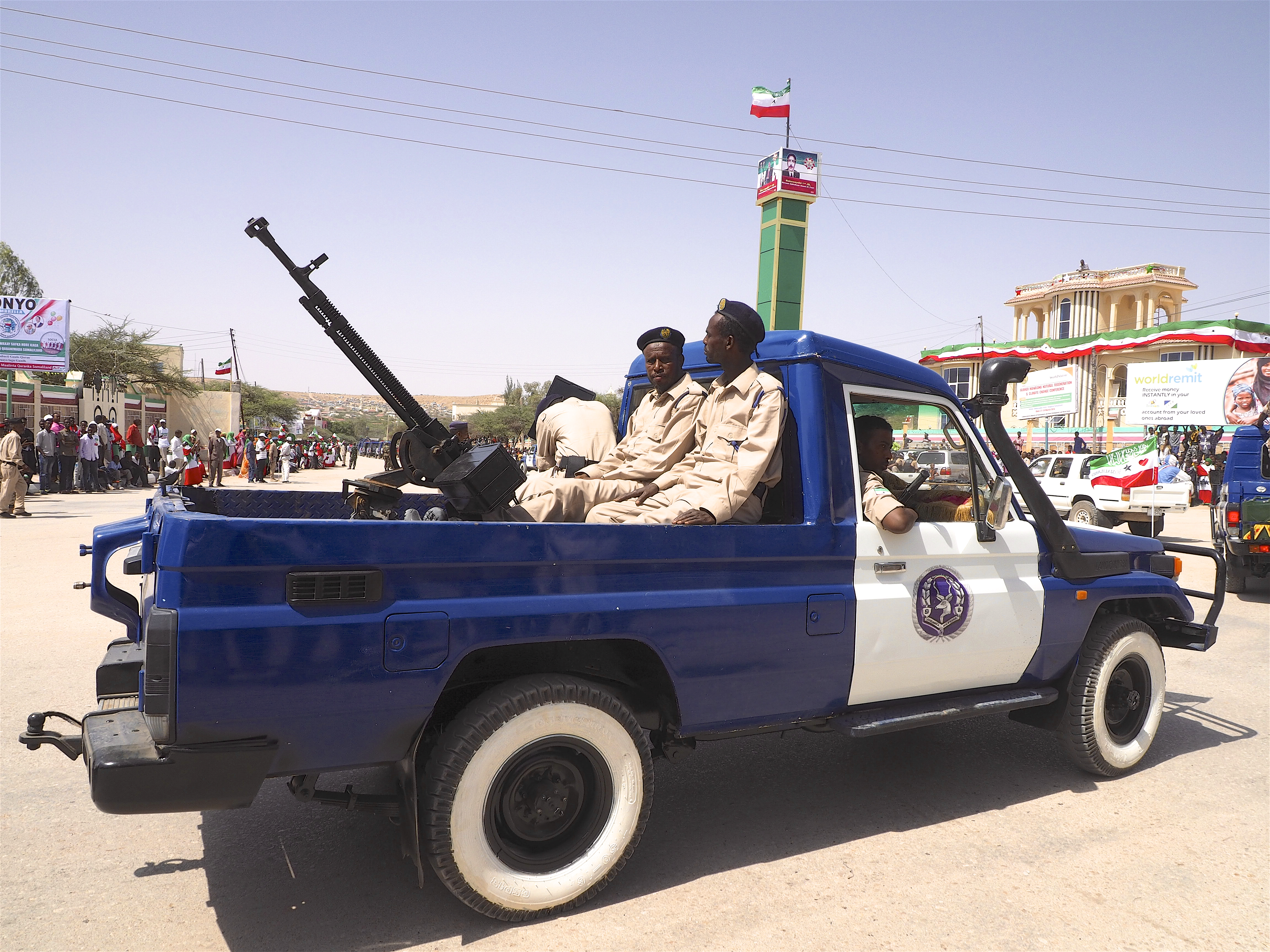
Somaliland Armed Forces Truck

== See also ==
- Somaliland National Armed Forces
- Nimcaan Yusuf Osman
- Politics of Somaliland
