= Ministry of Resettlement (Somaliland) =

Government ministry of Somaliland

Republic of Somaliland Ministry of Resettlement and Humanitarian Affairs
- Wasaradda Dib-u-dajinta & Arrimaha Bani'aadannimada (MORHA)
- Coat of arms of Somaliland

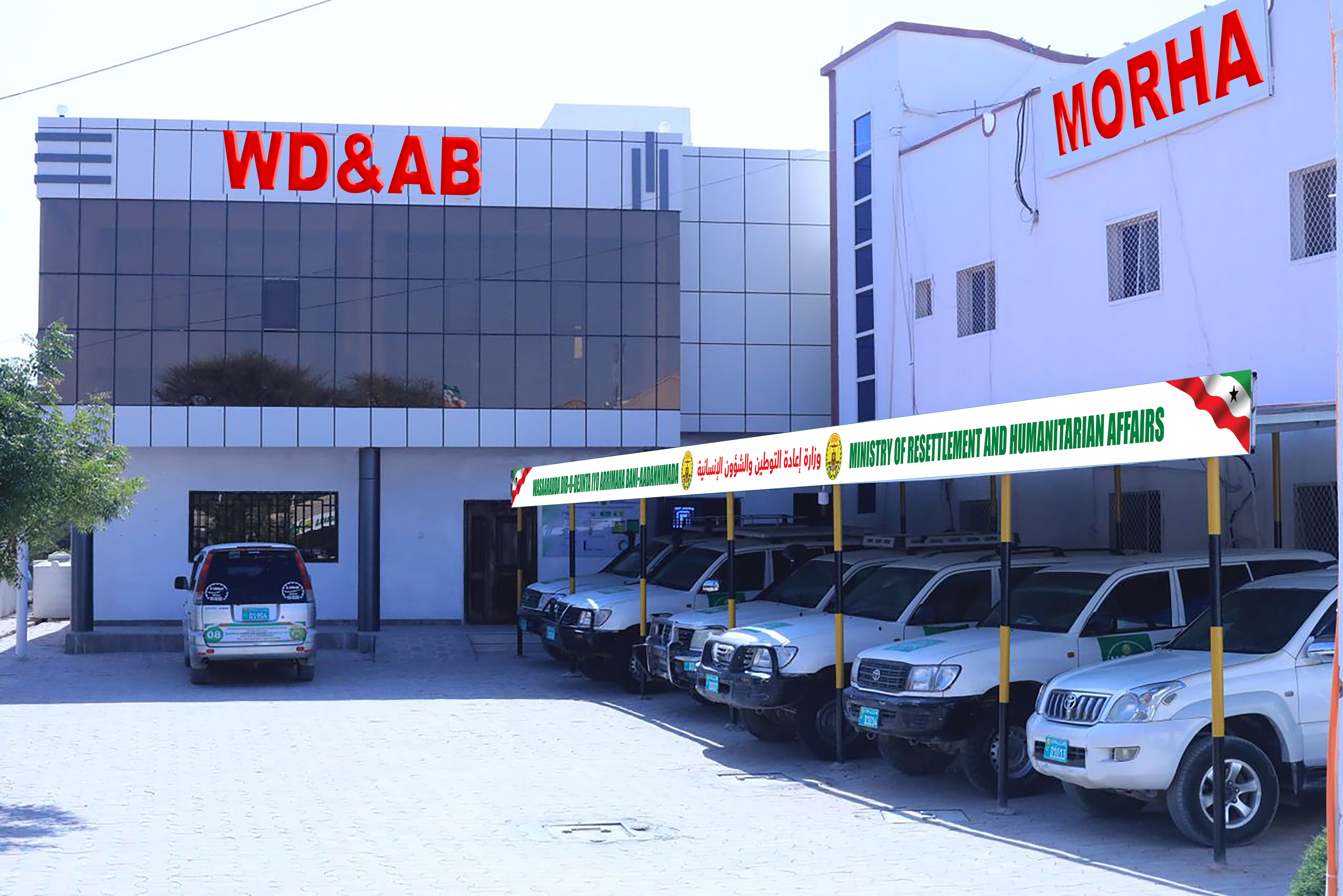

Ministry overview
- Formed: 1997; 29 years ago
- Jurisdiction: Somaliland
- Headquarters: Maroodi Jeex, Hargeisa (Somaliland)
- Minister responsible: Minister
- Website: https://ndra.govsomaliland.org/

The Ministry of Resettlement and Humanitarian Affairs of the Republic of Somaliland (MORHA) (Somali: Wasaradda Dib-u-dajinta & Arrimaha Bani'aadannimada or Dib-u-dejinta) is a Somaliland government ministry which is responsible for the resettling and rehabilitation of refugees and asylum seekers, as well as the reconstruction of displaced people.

== History ==
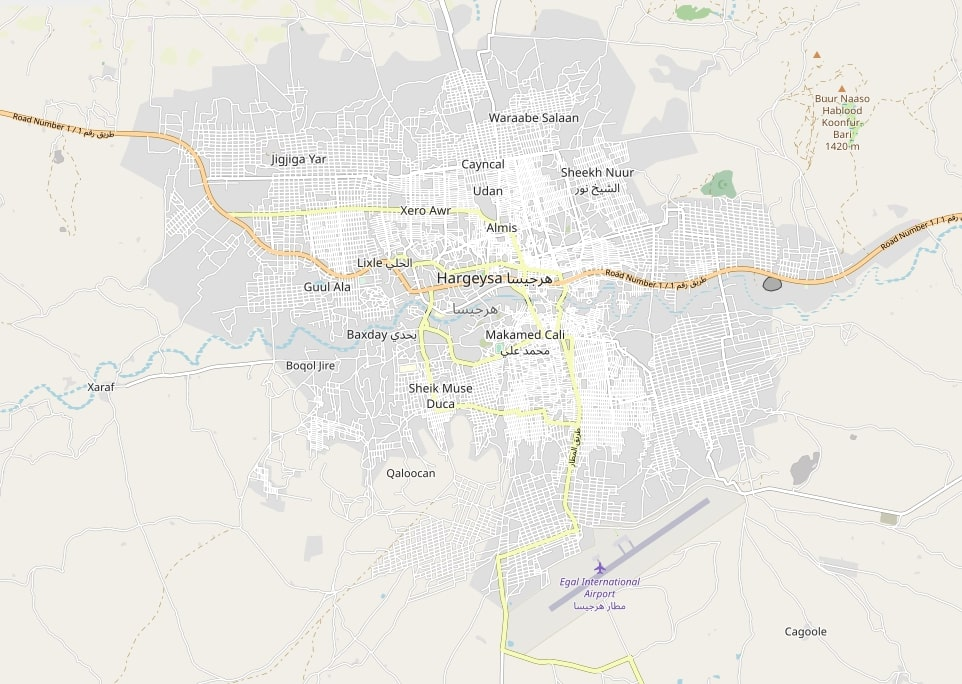
Relation map in capital Hargeisa.

According to 2002 reporting, the ministry was known as the Ministry of Resettlement, Rehabilitation, and Reconstruction (MRR&R) at least as early as 1998. It also called the name Ministry of Rehabilitation, Resettlement and Re-integration.

In June 1994, Minister of Resettlement and Reconstruction Yusuf Jama Burale reported that the government had spent eight months negotiating with the UNHCR regarding the repatriation of refugees from neighboring states. Burale highlighted the ministry's role in outlining resettlement preparations to facilitate the organized return of displaced Somalilanders.

In 2001, Somaliland's ministries faced severe financial constraints and weak institutional capacity due to a lack of international recognition and a struggling economy crippled by a Saudi livestock ban. Notably, the Ministry of Resettlement lacked the funding and human resources needed to support the tens of thousands of refugees returning home.

At 2011, the Ministry for Resettlement, Rehabilitation and Re-integration led the coordination of assistance for internally displaced persons (IDPs). However, persistent resource shortages meant needs far outweighed combined government and international efforts, necessitating a shift toward comprehensive, multi-sector programs focused on both immediate relief and long-term societal reintegration.

In March 2012, President Silanyo dismissed the Director General of the Ministry of Resettlement, Ahmed Elmi Barre, following a corruption scandal involving the misappropriation of government vehicles. Following this dismissal, the Minister of Resettlement was instructed to temporarily take over the responsibilities of the Director General in an acting capacity. The Director General had submitted his resignation while in detention.

In October 2013, the Ministry of Resettlement, in collaboration with the International Organization for Migration, established a mobile health clinic at the Mohamed Mooge settlement in Hargeisa. This project, which was co-funded by the governments of Japan and the United States, provided essential healthcare services to approximately 10,000 internally displaced persons.

In May 2014, the Ministry of Resettlement in collaboration with the Norwegian Refugee Council, facilitated the resettlement of 700 internally displaced households from a Mohamed Mooge settlement in central Hargeisa to a new permanent settlement in Digaale. The ministry's contribution included the provision of land for the settlement, marking a significant achievement in securing permanent housing and land tenure for displaced populations in Somaliland.

In April 2015, a presidential decree was issued stating that all authority regarding activities related to refugees and displaced persons belongs to the Ministry of Resettlement, clarifying the previously unclear jurisdictions between the Ministry of Resettlement and the Ministry of Interior.

In August 2015, the Ministry of Resettlement provided humanitarian aid to refugees fleeing the conflict in Yemen. The ministry, under Minister Ali Said Raygal, distributed food and essential supplies to displaced individuals in Berbera, playing a central role in managing the humanitarian response to the influx of arrivals from across the Gulf of Aden.

In December 2017, Muse Bihi Abdi, who became president, announced his cabinet appointments that same month, but the position of Minister of Resettlement was not included. In response, a protest rally was held in Burco. After that, its functions were integrated into the newly established Ministry of Employment, Social Affairs and Family (MESAF). This structural change was formalized in the 2018 Civil Service Law, which consolidated social welfare and resettlement mandates.

In December 2024, upon taking office as president, Irro revived this ministry as the Ministry of Resettlement and Humanitarian Affairs.

== Ministers ==
List of Somaliland Ministers of Resettlement
Image	Minister	Term start	Term end
	Hassan Adan Wadadid (Xassan Aadan Wadaadid)	1991	1992
	Yusuf Jama Burale (Yuusuf Jaamac Buraale)	1993	1997
	Yasin Haji Mohamoud (Yaasiin Xaaji Maxamuud Xiir)		
	Abdilahi Husein Iman Darawal (Cabdilaahi Xuseen Iimaan Darawal)	July 2003	August 2006
	Abshir Ahmed Hassan (Abshir Axmed Xasan)	August 2006	August 2008
	Mohamed Yusuf Osman (Maxamed Yuusuf Cismaan)	August 2008	July 2010
	Abdirisaq Ali Abdi (Cabdirisaaq Cali Cabdi)		
	Saleban Essa Ahmed (Xaglatoosiye)	October 2012	June 2013
	Ahmed Abdi Kahin (Axmed Cabdi Kaahin)	June 2013	
	Ali Said Raygal (Cali Siciid Raygal)	February 2015	December 2017
	(abolished)	December 2017	
	Saliban Duale Haji Jama (Saleebaan Ducaale Xaaji Jaamac)	December 2024	Present

== See also ==
- Politics of Somaliland
- Ministry of Presidency
- Ministry of Civil Aviation
