= Adan Ahmed Elmi =

4th Agricultural Minister of Somaliland

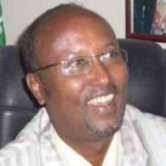

Minister of Agriculture of Somaliland
- In office 2005 – March 2010
- Preceded by: Ali Sheik Yusuf
- Succeeded by: Abdi Haybe Mohammed

Minister of Justice of Somaliland
- In office March 2010 – August 2010
- Preceded by: Ahmed Hassan Ali
- Succeeded by: Ismail Mumin Are

Personal details
- Born: 1966 (age 59–60) Hargeisa, Somaliland
- Party: UDUB
- Profession: politician, entrepreneur

Adan Ahmed Elmi (Somali: Aadan Axmed Cilmi), also known as Dolayare (Dhoolla-yare, Dhoolayare), was the 4th Agricultural Minister of Somaliland. He became the Agricultural Minister on May 10, 2002, after the resignation of Ali Sheik Yusuf.

== Biography ==
Elmi was born in Hargeisa, and spent his childhood in Mogadishu and Hargeisa . He hails from Gashanbur Eidagale Garhajis sub-clan of the Somali Isaaq clan.

Elmi is the son of Ahmed Elmi, a military commander during the Siad Barre years, now deceased. His mother, Khadija Mohamoud, owns fruit company in eastern Hargeisa. Belonging to the extended Dhoolayare family, he has three siblings, all of whom reside abroad.

Adan Ahmed Elmi was a prominent businessman in Somalia before the outbreak of the civil war in 1991.

Before his appointment to the Somaliland parliament, he was widely known for his comic Somali films, which were released in the late 1990s. In 2001, he joined the UDUB political party.

=== Agriculture Minister ===
In early 2005, Adan Ahmed Elmi returned from Norway to Somaliland and took up office as Agriculture Minister.

Although the Ministry of Agriculture had previously been relatively inactive, as minister Adan Ahmed Elmi mobilised support from international organisations and other partners in the country to assist local farmers through the provision of irrigation machinery, free seeds, and the distribution of tractors and oxen for ploughing.

=== Justice Minister ===
In March 2010, President Dahir Riyale Kahin appointed Adan Ahmed Elmi as Minister of Justice and, in his place, named Abdi Haybe Mohammed as Minister of Agriculture.

As Minister of Justice, Adan Ahmed Elmi inspected prisons and courts and worked with government institutions and international organisations to improve issues related to social justice in the country.

In late July 2010, after the Somaliland presidency passed to Ahmed Mohamed Silanyo, Adan Ahmed Elmi was replaced as Minister of Justice by Ismail Mumin Are, who formally assumed the post on August 1, 2010.

=== From Wadajir Party to Kulmiye ===
After the Kulmiye party came to power in 2010, Adan Ahmed Elmi left the government and founded the Wadajir party, which later merged with the Rays party.

In March 2011, Adan Ahmed Elmi criticised the Kulmiye party government, arguing that although it had promised substantial increases in income before coming to power, in reality salary payments continued to be delayed and needed to be urgently improved.

When the 2012 Somaliland municipal elections, Rays failed to secure a place among the three main parties, it joined the Kulmiye party based in part on the views of Adan Ahmed Elmi and others.

Adan Ahmed Elmi stated in October 2015 that the Kulmiye party's presidential candidate selection was heavily shaped by clan dynamics, warning that if both the Kulmiye and UCID candidates emerged from the same lineage, the UCID contender would likely be pressured to step aside. He further argued that, for the sake of political balance, the three major parties should ideally nominate candidates from outside the central clans.

=== Waddani Party ===
In October 2016, Adan Ahmed Elmi joined the Waddani party alongside Ismail Mahmud Hurre and other senior politicians from southern and central Hargeisa.

In October 2016, Adan Ahmed Elmi criticised the Silanyo administration's foreign policy as worse than that of the Dahir Riyale Kahin government and also condemned the decision to again postpone the House of Representatives election.

In February 2017, Waddani party politician Adan Ahmed Elmi congratulated Hassan Ali Khayre on his appointment as Somalia's new prime minister and commented that he should pursue internal reforms, open talks with the opposing Al-Shabaab movement and seek a lasting solution; at the time, it was unusual for a Somaliland politician to speak favourably about Somalia.

In June 2017, during a meeting of Somaliland opposition parties, Adan Ahmed Elmi, speaking on behalf of the Waddani party, stated that with regard to the forthcoming presidential election, any further postponement by the Guurti would neither be encouraged nor tolerated.

In September 2018, the president of Puntland held a cabinet meeting in Badhan, a town under Puntland's de facto control in disputed territory claimed by Somaliland; in response, Adan Ahmed Elmi sharply criticised the Somaliland government, arguing that its failure to anticipate the visit or take effective action represented a shameful failure for the state.

In March 2022, Adan Ahmed Elmi condemned the Hargeisa Water Agency manager's remarks that his own community had not been adequately appreciated for providing the water source and that he had cut water supplies because the area was the home region of both himself and the president, criticising the statements as clan-centred and inappropriate for invoking the president in such a manner rather than representing the nation as a whole.

Preceded by Ali Sheik Yusuf	Agricultural Minister of Somaliland; 2005–2010	Succeeded by Abdi Haybe Mohammed
