= Ali Said Raygal =

Somali politician

Ali Said Raygal علي سعيد رايجال
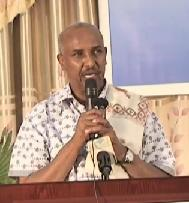

Minister of Resettlement and Rehabilitation
- In office 28 October 2015 – 14 December 2017
- President: Ahmed Mohamed Mohamoud
- Preceded by: Saleban Isse Ahmed

Minister of Youth and Sports
- In office 15 March 2012 – 28 October 2015
- President: Ahmed Mohamed Mohamoud
- Preceded by: Abdi Said Fahiye
- Succeeded by: Ahmed Abdi Kahin

Manager of State Printing Agency
- In office 28 June 2010 – 15 March 2012
- President: Ahmed Mohamed Mohamoud
- Preceded by: Mohamoud Rage Ibrahim
- Succeeded by: Abdillahi Mohamed Jama

Ali Said Raygal (Somali: Cali Saciid Raygaal, Arabic: علي سعيد رايجال) is a Somali politician. He is the former Minister of Youth and Sports of the autonomous Somaliland region in northwestern Somalia. Raygal was appointed to the position by the regional president Ahmed Mohamed Mohamoud, following a cabinet reshuffle on 15 March 2012.
