= Abdiqani Mohamoud Ateye =

Somaliland politician

Abdiqani Mohamoud Ateye Farid عبد الغني محمود عاطية
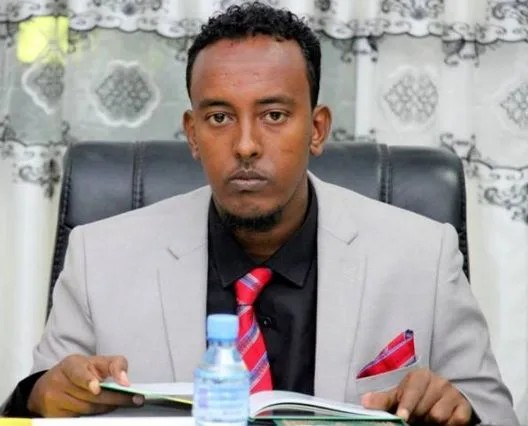

Minister of Defence
- In office 31 March 2019 – 7 January 2024
- President: Muse Bihi Abdi
- Preceded by: Isse Ahmed Yusuf
- Succeeded by: Rooble Abdi Elmi

Minister of Justice
- In office 14 December 2017 – 31 March 2019
- President: Muse Bihi Abdi
- Preceded by: Ahmed Farah Adarre
- Succeeded by: Mustafe Mohamoud Ali

Personal details
- Party: Kulmiye

Abdiqani Mohamoud Ateye Farid (Somali: Cabdiqani Maxamuud Caateeye Fariid) is a Somalilander politician, who served as the Defence Minister of Somaliland from his appointment in 2019 to 2024.

== Biography ==
Ateye is from the Issa clan.

=== Justice Minister ===
In December 2017, President Muse Bihi Abdi announced his cabinet appointments, naming Ateye as Minister of Justice.

In June 2018, Abdiqani Mahmoud Ateye said that his ministry was implementing a public education program to help citizens correctly understand their legal rights and obligations, and added that plans were underway to provide support mechanisms for people who could not afford to hire lawyers. He also criticized individuals on the Somalia side for spreading misinformation about Somaliland’s justice system.

=== Defence Minister ===
In March 2019, Ateye was appointed Minister of Defense, replacing Isse Ahmed Yusuf who had been dismissed.

In April 2019, Ateye denied a social-media claim that he had signed a letter—allegedly from his time as Minister of Justice—ordering the arrest of a Somaliland businessman, and said that whoever fabricated the rumour was an enemy of Somaliland’s existence.

In January 2020, the UK government’s Special Representative for Somaliland, Stuart Brown, and the British military’s Commander for the Horn of Africa, Col. Huan Davies, each met in their offices with Somaliland’s Minister of Defence Ateye and the Somaliland military command.

In May 2020, Ateye wrote on Twitter condemning arms that the Egyptian government had donated to the Somali government.

In August 2021, Ateye rejected as factually incorrect claims made by House Speaker Abdirisak Khalif, who had suggested that the government may have improperly influenced elections, and that the government lacked representation from respected intellectuals and traditional elders of the Sool region.

In July 2022, Israeli media reported that Somaliland was seeking to establish relations with Israel and that the Somaliland Minister of Defence had attended a related meeting; however, Defence Minister Ateye denied the claim, stating that he had never represented Somaliland at any such meeting and adding that he had personally never even met a Jewish person.

==== Las Anod conflict ====
In February 2023, speaking at a ceremony marking the 29th anniversary of the founding of Somaliland’s national army, Ateye said the Somaliland armed forces were not clan militias but a national army drawn from across Somaliland, and argued that terrorists organized the unrest in Las Anod to obstruct voter registration and exclude the Sool community from registering.

In late February 2023, Ateye said that militia forces from Puntland had attacked Somaliland troops stationed in Tukaraq, and that Somaliland forces had repelled the assault.

In April 2023, Ateye accused Puntland presidential adviser Mohammed Said Hersi Morgan of joining the fighting in Las Anod, alleging that he was leading SSC forces battling Somaliland-aligned troops in the area.

In July 2023, Ateye said that Las Anod had become a place entered by wild beasts, adding that while there had been gains in the early stages of the fighting, the people of Las Anod and their administration had been thrown into confusion, that foreign actors had entered Somaliland and launched attacks, and that he called on the national army to remain patient and on the public to support the armed forces.

==== Resign ====
On 7 January 2024, Ateye resigned in protest of a Memorandum of Understanding (MOU) between Ethiopia and Somaliland that allowed Ethiopia to access Somaliland’s coastline, saying "Ethiopia remains our number one enemy".

=== Former Defence Minister ===
In March 2024, the SSC-Khatumo administration announced that it would file a complaint with an International Criminal Court against Somaliland President Muse Bihi Abdi and senior military officials, including former Defence Minister Ateye, alleging war crimes.

In September 2024, commenting on Somaliland’s defeat in the Las Anod conflict, Abdikarim Ahmed Mohamed Sinif—chair of Somaliland’s National Refugees and IDPs Agency—accused former Defence Minister Ateye of contributing to the setback, alleging that Ateye had covertly coordinated with the opposition Waddani Party and had told the media that two army brigades were “missing,” a claim Sinif said helped lead to troops being tracked down and captured.

=== Governor of Sahil ===
In December 2025, President Abdirahman Mohamed Abdullahi “Irro” appointed seven new regional governors, naming Ateye as Governor of Sahil Region to replace Mohamed Dahir Abdalla Gafane.

== See also ==
- List of Somaliland politicians
- Ministry of Defence (Somaliland)
- Ministry of Justice (Somaliland)
- List of Somalis

Political offices
Preceded by Ahmed Farah Adarre	Minister of Justice; 2017–2019	Succeeded by Abdirisaq Ali Abdi
Preceded by Isse Ahmed Yusuf	Minister of Defence; 2019–present	Succeeded by Rooble Abdi Elmi
