= Ministry of Labour (Somaliland) =

Government ministry of Somaliland

Republic of Somaliland Ministry of Labour, Social Affairs and Family
- Wasaaradda Shaqada, Arrimaha Bulshada & Qoyska; MoLSAF
- Coat of arms of Somaliland

Ministry overview
- Formed: 2010; 16 years ago
- Jurisdiction: Somaliland
- Headquarters: Maroodi Jeex, Hargeisa (Somaliland); 9°33′51″N 44°02′56″E
- Minister responsible: Milgo Mohamed Elmi l, Minister
- Website: mesaf.govsomaliland.org

Footnotes
- Ministry of Labour on Facebook

The Ministry of Labour, Social Affairs and Family of the Republic of Somaliland (MoLSAF) (Somali: Wasaarada Shaqada, Arrimaha Bulshada iyo Qoyska ee Somaliland) (Arabic: وزارة العمل والشؤون الاجتماعية والأسرية) is a ministry of the Somaliland cabinet which is concerned by for setting national labour standards, employment, workforce participation, family affairs and social services. The current minister is Milgo Mohamed Elmi

== Changes in Ministry Names ==
=== Ministry of Health and Labour ===
In July 2003, Kisman Qasim Qodah was appointed Minister of Health and Labour (Somali: Wasiirka Wasaaradda Caafimaadka iyo Shaqada). This led to the creation of a ministry bearing the name “Labor.”

=== Ministry of Labour and Social Affairs ===
In July 2010, Ilhan Mahamed Jama was appointed Minister of Labour and Social Affairs (MOLSA, Somali: Wasiirka Wasaaradda Shaqada iyo Arrimaha Bulshada). This Ministry was established through the merger of the former Ministry of Family and the Directorate of Labour, the latter of which had previously operated under the Ministry of Health.

=== Ministry of Employment, Social Affairs and Family ===
In December 2017, Hinda Jama Hersi was appointed Minister of Employment, Social Affairs and Family (MESAF, Somali: Wasiirka Wasaaradda Shaqogalinta, Arrimaha Bulshada iyo Qoyska.) In Somali, shaqada refers to work itself, while shaqo-gelinta refers to employment creation.

=== Ministry of Labour, Social Affairs and Family ===
In December 2024, Irro, newly elected President of Somaliland, appointed Milgo Mahamed Ilmi (Sambaloshe) as Minister of Labour, Social Affairs, and Family (MOLSAF, Somali: Wasiirka Wasaaradda Shaqada, Arrimaha Bulshada & Qoyska).

== History ==
In April 2011, the Government of Somaliland reported its achievements for the previous three months, stating that the Ministry of Labour and Social Affairs had completed the first draft of a Family Law based on Sharia, formulated a national policy on female genital mutilation (FGM), established a rehabilitation and protection centre for street children, begun implementation of the National Gender Policy, facilitated recruitment to positions in international and domestic organisations, promoted vocational training programmes, and established a labour safety unit within the Directorate of Labour to supervise labour conditions.

As of 2016, the UK-based FGM/C Research Initiative reported that the Ministry of Labour, which responsible for gender issues in Somaliland, had not yet reached agreement on a national policy or strategy for the eradication of FGM.

In July 2017, the Minister of Labour and Social Affairs stated that many companies and institutions in Somaliland were violating the Civil Labour Law, including the requirement that vacant posts be advertised in national newspapers for at least two weeks and that recruitment be conducted by a committee including representatives of the employer and the Ministry of Labour and Social Affairs.

In September 2018, the Rape and Sexual Offences Act was brought into force. The House of Elders and the House of Representatives were reportedly at odds over the act, which was described as having generated major controversy on the grounds that it was contrary to Islam. Then, this act was enacted, but was reportedly suspended and was not effectively implemented in practice. In 2020, a new act incorporating the views of religious leaders and traditional elders was introduced, but Somaliland Women in Law criticized it as violating the Constitution of Somaliland and international human rights law and as placing girls and women at great risk.

In October 2018, the Somaliland Minister of Labour submitted a letter to the Supreme Court of Somaliland requesting a review of a decision issued by the Ministry of Labour earlier in 2018 in a dispute between the African Relief Committee and two teachers, which had ruled in favour of the teachers following a complaint by the African Relief Committee. The minister also requested a review of another case involving the African Relief Committee and a different teacher, in which the Maroodi-Jeex Regional Court had issued a judgment in August 2018 in favour of the teacher. Hiiraan Online noted that the reasons for the minister’s intervention in decisions that had already been issued by the courts were unclear.

In November 2018, the Ministry of Labour and Social Affairs announced that three foreign workers had been deported for working in positions that Somaliland citizens were capable of performing.

In May 2021, the European Union launched two projects in Somaliland in cooperation with the Ministry of Employment, Social Affairs and Family to reduce violence against women and girls and female genital mutilation (FGM). The projects, implemented by the NGOs Candlelight and Health Poverty Action, aim to combat sexual and gender-based violence and FGM through community-based awareness activities and by strengthening the rights of women and girls. Rape, early marriage, and FGM remain widespread in Somaliland, where an estimated 99 percent of women aged 15–49 have undergone FGM. The Somaliland government has also established an inter-ministerial task force to develop a zero-tolerance policy on FGM.

In September 2024, the Ministry of Employment, Social Affairs and Family (MESAF) hosted a two-day Linking and Learning Forum with support from Options' The Girl Generation programme and ActionAid International Somaliland. During the forum, the President of Somaliland formally approved the signing of the Somaliland National Anti-FGM Policy by the Minister of Employment, Social Affairs and Family, strengthening Somaliland's efforts towards a zero-tolerance stance on FGM/C.

== Ministers ==
Image	Minister	Somali Name	Term start	Term end
	Ilhan Mahamed Jama	Ilhaan Maxamed Jaamac	July 2010	March 2013
	Mahamud Ahmed Barre	Maxamuud Axmed Barre (Garaad)	March 2013	
	Mahamed Abdilahi Obsiye	Maxamed Cabdillaahi Obsiiye	December 2016	
	Hinda Jama Hersi (Gani/Gaani)	Hinda Jaamac Xirsi	December 2017	January 2021
	Mustafe Mohamoud Ali (Bile)	Mustafe Maxamuud Cali (Biile)	January 2021	January 2023
	Ali Omar Mohamed (Ali Horhor)	Cali Cumar Maxamed (Cali Xoor-xoor)	January 2023	
	Milgo Mohamed Elmi (Sambalooshe)	Milgo Maxamed Cilmi (Sanbalooshe)	December 2024	

== See also ==
- Politics of Somaliland
- Cabinet of Somaliland
