= Ministry of Justice (Somaliland) =

Republic of Somaliland Ministry of Justice
- Wasaarada Caddaalada
- Coat of arms of Somaliland

Ministry overview
- Formed: 1991; 35 years ago
- Jurisdiction: Somaliland
- Headquarters: Hargeisa, Maroodi Jeh (Somaliland)
- Minister responsible: Mustafe Mohamoud Ali, Minister
- Website: www.slmoj.org

The Ministry of Justice of the Republic Somaliland (Somali: Wasaaradda Caddaalada Somaliland) (Arabic: وزارة العدل) administers the court system (with the exception of the Supreme Court) and has the authority to hire court personnel, allocate funds, and train, discipline or dismiss judicial officers. According to Articles 7 and 38 of the Organisation of the Judiciary Law, the ministry even compiles a panel of assessors on an annual basis for the regional courts. Additionally, the ministry is a member of the Judicial Commission. The current minister is Mustafe Mohamoud Ali

== Responsibilities ==
More so, the objectives of the ministry are as follows per Article 105 of the Constitution:

- Uphold and promote the rule of law in Somaliland;
- Respect and promote the separation of powers as contemplated in the Constitution, whilst taking into account the normal checks and balances of governmental branches;
- Promote and maintain an effective, efficient, transparent and accountable criminal justice system;
- Coordinate, facilitate and promote the general provision of and access to legal services in Somaliland;
- Take leadership in coordinating the progressive realization of rights and freedoms contemplated in the Constitution;
- Cooperate and support other role players, whilst respecting their specific mandates and, where applicable, their independence.

== List of ministers ==
Image	English (Nickname)	Somali	Term Start	Term End
	Ahmed Ismail Abdi (Duqsi)	Axmed Ismaciil Cabdi (Duqsi)	1991	1993
	Abdillahi Gireh Robleh	Cabdullaahi Giire Rooble	1993	1997
	Abdillahi Omaw Qawdan			May 1999
	Ahmed Hassan Caafi	Axmed Xasan Caafi		March 2002
	Abdihamid Garad Jama	Cabdihamiid Garaad Jaamac	March 2002	November 2002
	Ahmed Hassan Ali (Asowe)	Axmed Xasan Cali (Casoowe)	November 2002, July 2003	March 2010
	Adan Ahmed Elmi (Dolayare)	Aadan Axmed Cilmi (Dhoolla-yare)	March 2010	October 2010
	Ismail Mumin Are	Ismaaciil Muumin Aare	October 2010	June 2011
	Hussein Ahmed Aideed	Xuseen Axmed Caydiid	June 2011	October 2015
	Ahmed Farah Adarre	Axmed Faarax Cadare	October 2015	December 2017
	Abdiqani Mohamoud Ateye	Cabdiqani Maxamuud Caateeye	December 2017	March 2019
	Abdirisaq Ali Abdi Salah	Cabdirisaaq Cali Cabdi Saalax	March 2019	December 2019
	Mustafe Mohamoud Ali（Godane）	Mustafe Maxamuud Cali Bile	December 2019	January 2021
	Saleban Warsame Guled	Saleebaan Warsame Guuleed	January 2021	December 2024
	Yonis Ahmed Yonis Muhammed	Yoonis Axmed Yoonis	December 2024	Incumbent

== See also ==
- Justice ministry
- Politics of Somaliland
