= Ismail Mumin Are =

Somaliland politician

- Ismaaciil Muumin Aare

Minister of Justice
- In office October 2010 – June 2011
- President: Ahmed Mohamed Mohamoud
- Preceded by: Adan Ahmed Elmi
- Succeeded by: Hussein Ahmed Aideed

Personal details
- Occupation: Politician

Ismail Mumin Are (Somali: Ismaaciil Muumin Aare) is a Somaliland politician from the Gadabuursi clan who served as both Justice Minister and Public Works Minister under President Ahmed Mohamed Mohamoud “Silanyo”. He is a prominent political figure from the Awdal region and has long been active within the Kulmiye Party.

== Biography ==
Ismail Mumin is from Awdal region and are belongs to the Gadabuursi clan.

=== Awdal regional factionary ===
During the presidency of Dahir Riyale Kahin, Ismail Mumin Are was part of the opposition and became known for his reasoned, scholarly criticism of government policy.

In January 2008, members of the Qaran party visiting Borama were forced to leave a hotel meal by police acting on the orders of the Awdal regional governor, prompting strong condemnation from Kulmiye politicians and MPs from Awdal; Kulmiye's vice-presidential contenders Ismail Mumin Are and Abdirahman Saylici held a joint press conference, arguing that the incident was an unacceptable insult and that the governor of Awdal should apologise.

In April 2008, Ismail Mumin Are publicly urged that a new government should be formed by the time President Kahin's five-year term expired.

In September 2008, Abdirahman Saylici, who had just been selected by the Kulmiye Party as its candidate for vice president, visited Borama together with Ismail Mumin Are—who had not been chosen as the running mate—to address supporters. The visit was warmly welcomed by many residents, but parts of the reception were obstructed by government security forces, and in his speech, Ismail Mumin Are declared that it was a great day that demonstrated their traditional unity and reminded the audience that Saylici was a symbol of Somaliland's unity.

In October 2009, a serious rift emerged between the Kulmiye Party's leadership and its Awdal regional officials, leading to the cancellation of a jointly planned press conference in Borama. Awdal regional figure Ismail Mumin Are rejected the draft statement, arguing that it merely imitated the ruling party and lacked any new policies or substantive content, making a simple declaration of support meaningless.

In November 2009, Somaliland's Minister of Minerals and Water Resources Qaasim Sheekh Yusuf passed away, and while speculation circulated that Ismail Mumin Are might be appointed to succeed him, he stated that he had never considered the position and had no intention of seeking it.

=== Justice Minister ===
In July 2010, President Ahmed Mohamed Silanyo announced his cabinet appointments, appointing Ismail Mumin Are as Minister of Justice. Although both Ismail Mumin Are and his predecessor Aadan Ahmed Cilmi were from Awdal, many residents of the region viewed the removal of Cilmi—a senior figure in Awdal politics since the era of former President Rayaale—as a sign that President Silanyo was sidelining Awdal. In response, the newly appointed minister, Ismail Mumin Are, urged that this was not a time to fan the winds of opposition and that the government should instead exercise firm leadership.

In November 2010, a forty-member national peace delegation was dispatched to help resolve the conflict between Buuhoodle and Qoorlugud, with Ismail Mumin Are among the ministers who took part in the mission.

In February 2011, the new facility of Hargeisa Central Prison was officially inaugurated. At the ceremony, alongside the vice president, Ismail Mumin Are also delivered remarks, arguing that prisons are not a final solution to societal problems but remain indispensable, and that reducing crime and the number of inmates requires reforming the prison system itself. He further called for correcting the imbalance in the ratio between inmates and guards.

In February 2011, at an international conference held in Seychelles, the United Nations proposed that trials of pirates captured off the coast of Somalia should be conducted in Somaliland, but the Somaliland government rejected the plan because it could provoke instability and retaliation within the country, with Ismail Mumin Are attending the meeting as Minister of Justice.

=== Public Works Minister ===
In June 2011, President Ahmed Mohamed Silanyo announced a cabinet reshuffle and appointed former Minister of Public Works Hussein Ahmed Aideed as Minister of Justice, and former Minister of Justice Ismail Mumin Are as Minister of Public Works.

In July 2011, Minister of Public Works Ismail Mumin Are spoke for the first time about the scrap metal trade in Somaliland, explaining that those collecting scrap metal were mainly ordinary citizens, especially unemployed young people, who were gathering derelict vehicles and war debris to sell as scrap to countries such as Ethiopia and Saudi Arabia, but that this activity was dangerous and involved material that ought to be recycled under government supervision and used domestically, so citizens should act with caution until proper measures are put in place.

In August 2011, Ismail Mumin Are warned wealthy businessmen that they should protect state property and refrain from using money to curry favour with senior officials, stating that a nationwide inventory of public assets would be launched and that any properties found to have been illicitly sold would be subject to follow-up investigation.

In November 2011, a delegation of ministers and members of parliament representing the Awdal and Salal regions arrived in Borama late at night, accompanied by Ismail Mumin Are. Their visit was widely believed to be connected to growing activities by anti-Somaliland diaspora groups abroad and to efforts to reassure and sensitize the local population. However, the sudden arrival generated considerable suspicion among residents, and the local religious figure Sheikh Mohamed Aden voiced a critical view of the delegation.

In December 2011, it was reported that several members of Somaliland's thirty-member cabinet had their families living abroad. While fifteen ministers were noted as having their spouses and children residing inside the country; among them was Ismail Mumin Are.

In March 2012, President Ahmed Mohamed Silanyo replaced Ismail Mumin Are as Minister of Public Works and Housing with Ahmed Abdi Mohamed (Habsade). During the past ruling party's presidential contest Ismail Mumin Are had backed Silanyo, so the appointment was regarded as surprising by commentators and the media at the time. The dismissal of Ismail Mumin Are was widely criticised as hasty and as the removal of a heavyweight political figure, with commentators noting that he had long been an activist within Kulmiye, playing an important role since the party's founding and struggle years and serving as a key intermediary between his home community and the government. Ismail Mumin Are commented on his dismissal by stating that, since it was the president who had both appointed and removed him, he was grateful in both respects, adding that he did not consider the four newly appointed ministers to be inferior to himself and that he would continue to serve his country.

=== After that ===
In April 2012, during an internal review of Kulmiye's Central Council leadership, the party considered whether to replace Vice President Abdirahman Saylici in his position as Deputy Chair of the council, and Ismail Mumin Are was among the potential candidates. Saylici's wish to retain the post and President Silanyo's view that his continued role was essential for party management prevailed, resulting in Saylici remaining in the position.

In May 2014, the Kulmiye party announced the allocation of 364 seats on its Central Council among Somaliland's clans, with Ismail Mumin Are selected as one of the representatives for the Dir clan group.

== Family ==
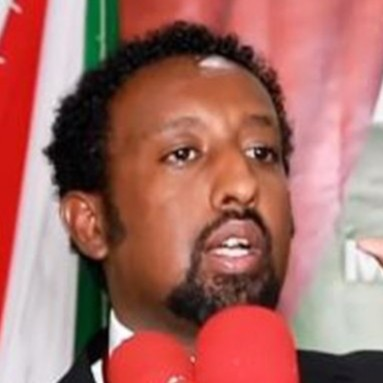
Abdishakur Ismail Mumin

- Abdishakur Ismail Mumin - Son. Executive director of Somaliland's National AIDS Control Commission.

Political offices
Preceded by Adan Ahmed Elmi	Minister of Justice; 2010–2011	Succeeded by Hussein Ahmed Aideed
