= Ministry of Agriculture (Somaliland) =

Government ministry of Somaliland

Republic of Somaliland Ministry of Agriculture
- Wasaaradda Horumarinta Beeraha (MoA)
- Coat of arms of Somaliland

Ministry overview
- Formed: 1993; 33 years ago
- Jurisdiction: Somaliland
- Headquarters: Hargeisa, Maroodi Jeh (Somaliland)
- Website: moadgovsl.org

Footnotes
- Ministry of Agriculture on Facebook

The Ministry of Agricultural Development of the Republic of Somaliland (MoAD) (Somali: Wasaaradda Horumarinta Beeraha Somaliland) (Arabic: وزارة الزراعة) is a government ministry of Somaliland responsible for agriculture. The ministry is responsible for formulating and implementing the agricultural policies, forestry, water resources, irrigation, promotion and development of farmers and cooperative systems.

== Ministers ==
Image	Minister	Term start	Term end
	Muuse Inji	1997 - 2000	
	Adan Ahmed Elmi	2005	March 2010
	Abdi Haybe Mahamed	March 2010	
	Farah Elmi Geedole	27 July 2010	26 October 2015
	Mohamed Dahir Ibrahim	26 October 2015	14 December 2017
	Ahmed Mumin Seed	14 December 2017	02 September 2021
	Mohamed Haji Osman Jama	02 September 2021	27 June 2022
	Abdulkadir Iman Warsame	27 June 2022	December 2024
	Mohamud Egeh Yousuf	14 December 2024	
	Adan Geddi Qayaad	April 2026	Present

== See also ==
- Politics of Somaliland
- Cabinet of Somaliland
