= Abdulkadir Iman Warsame =

Somali politician

- Cabdiqaadir Iimaan Warsame
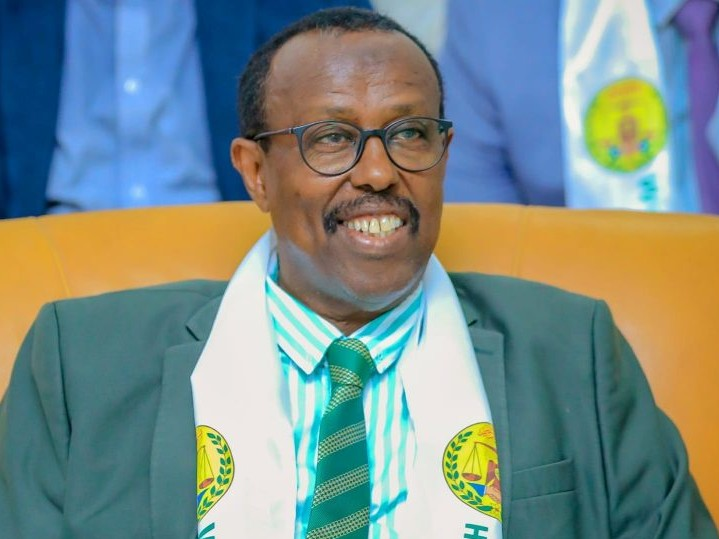

Minister of Agriculture
- President: Muse Bihi Abdi
- Preceded by: Mohamed Haji Osman Jama
- Succeeded by: Mohamud Egeh Yousuf

Abdulkadir Iman Warsame (Somali: Cabdiqaadir Iimaan Warsame) is the founder of Somaliland construction company UNIECO, former chairman of the Somaliland National Electoral Commission, and former minister of agriculture of Somaliland.

== Biography ==
=== Chairman of engineering company ===
In 2003, Abdulkadir Iman brought together engineers and businessmen with experience working in Somaliland and abroad to establish UNIECO (Universal Engineering & Consultant Company), a construction firm based in Hargeisa.

As of February 2012, Abdulkadir Iman was serving as founder and chairman of an engineering company based in Hargeisa, UNIECO (Universal Engineering Company).

=== National Electoral Commission chairman ===
In November 2014, Somaliland President Ahmed Mohamed Mohamoud "Silanyo" nominated Abdikadir Iman and two other members to the five-year-term National Electoral Commission (NEC), and in early December all seven commissioners unanimously elected him as their chairman.

Around 2015, the NEC partnered with a research group at the University of Notre Dame to field-test a new voter registration system based on iris recognition, which Abdulkadir Iman described as one of the most advanced voter registration systems in the world.

In 2017, President Silanyo announced a two-year extension of the NEC's mandate. The 2017 Somaliland presidential election, observed by an international mission, introduced biometric iris-scan voter registration nationwide and saw largely peaceful, well-organised polling with significant voter participation. Irregularities and delays were noted, but observers judged them insufficient to affect the final result, citizens’ commitment to constitutional, rule-based politics.

By that time, the six-year-term House of Elders had not held an election since 1997, the five-year-term House of Representatives had last gone to the polls in 2005, and the five-year-term local councils had not held elections since 2012. None of these elections took place during Abdulkadir Iman Warsame's tenure as the electoral commission chairman.

In February 2018, responding to questions from the media, Abdulkadir Iman stated that “we were chosen by the three national parties, the government, and the parliament, and if they take away our mandate, we are personally ready to resign.”

In March 2019, Abdulkadir Iman responded to a suggestion by the chairman of a civil society umbrella organization that the electoral commission should resign by stating that their mandate had not yet expired and that they had no reason to step down.

In June 2019, the National Electoral Commission invited the opposition and other stakeholders to a briefing on a new voter registration system under the name of Abdulkadir Iman, but the opposition party Waddani refused to attend, arguing that it did not recognize the current commission as legitimate.

On 13 November 2019, the Somaliland House of Representatives approved six new members of the National Electoral Commission, including Abdirashid Mohamoud Ali "Riyo-raac" as chairman. On 25 November, the new National Electoral Commission was sworn in before President Muse Bihi Abdi. The opposition rejected this, and on 19 December an elders’ committee proposed dissolving the new National Electoral Commission and reinstating the members of the previous commission. On 15 January, a meeting was held between President Muse Bihi Abdi and opposition leaders, but President Bihi told them that he did not have the authority to dissolve the National Electoral Commission, and the new commissioners consequently remained in place.

=== Agriculture Minister ===
On 27 June 2022, Somaliland President Muse Bihi Abdi announced a cabinet reshuffle, appointing Abdulkadir Iman as Minister of Agricultural Development to replace Mohamed Haji Osman Jama and naming Yurub Abiib Abdi Omar as Deputy Minister of Agricultural Development.

In October 2022, speaking to the state media, Abdulkadir Iman urged farmers in the drought-affected eastern regions to harvest and store the autumn rains, plant crops, and follow the ministry's weekly rainfall forecasts, adding that survey teams were being sent to farms to collect data on crop conditions and that the ministry had begun efforts to control armyworm infestations in the western regions.

In December 2022, a delegation led by Abdulkadir Iman visited several villages in Togdheer region to hear from residents about security and living conditions and to urge them to take part in obtaining voter registration cards.

In May 2023, Abdulkadir Iman announced the launch of a new nationwide crop support programme under which the government would purchase domestically produced grains for storage in the national reserve in order to increase farmers’ incomes and strengthen food security.

In October 2023, Abdulkadir Iman, speaking in Berbera at an event held by the Ministry of Agricultural Development to mark World Food Day on 16 October, said that the ministry would soon launch a five-year project in parts of Sahil, Daadmadheedh and Togdheer regions, costing several million dollars and funded by Germany's development bank KfW through the government represented by his ministry.

On 14 December 2024, newly elected president Abdirahman Mohamed Abdullahi "Irro" announced his cabinet, appointing Mohamud Egeh Yousuf as minister of agricultural development and Mukhtar Haji Mohamud Farah as deputy minister of agricultural development.

Political offices
Preceded by Mohamed Haji Osman Jama	Minister of Agriculture; 2022–2024	Next: Mohamud Egeh Yousuf
