= Ministry of Fishery (Somaliland) =

Government ministry of Somaliland

Republic of Somaliland Ministry of Fishery and Marine Resources
- Wasaaradda Kaluumaysiga iyo Horumarinta Xeebaha (MoFMR)
- Coat of arms of Somaliland

Agency overview
- Jurisdiction: Somaliland
- Headquarters: Woqooyi Galbeed, Hargeisa (Somaliland)
- Agency executive: Minister
- Website: https://mofcd.govsomaliland.org/

The Ministry of Fishery and Marine Resources of the Republic of Somaliland (MoFMR, Somali: Wasaaradda Kaluumaysiga iyo Horumarinta Xeebaha) is a Somaliland government ministry which is responsible for the country's fishery sectors.

== History ==
In October 2007, the Somaliland Ministry of Fisheries and the Somaliland Coast Guard conducted a joint operation that led to the seizure of three Yemeni fishing vessels. The boats were apprehended for conducting illegal fishing activities within Somaliland's territorial waters.

In December 2015, a fish exhibition was held in the capital Hargeisa, attended by a delegation from the Somali Regional State of Ethiopia. The event aimed to promote fish consumption and strengthen trade relations between the two regions.

In March 2016, Djibouti apologized to Somaliland after a sea clash near Zeila killed a Somaliland Coast Guard officer. The Somaliland Ministry of Fisheries and other officials held talks in Djibouti to resolve the tension. Both countries agreed to form a joint committee to work together on sea security and safety.

In December 2017, under the administration of President Muse Bihi Abdi, the Ministry of Livestock and the Ministry of Fisheries and Marine Resources were merged to form the Ministry of Livestock and Fishery Development (Somali: Wasaaradda Xannaanda Xoolaha iyo Kalluumaysiga, Arabic: وزارة الثروة الحيوانية والسمكية.) This structural reorganization was intended to streamline government operations and improve administrative efficiency by consolidating related economic sectors under a single ministry.

In March 2020, the Somaliland Minister of Livestock and Fisheries announced the revocation of operating licenses for four commercial fishing vessels granted during the previous minister's term. This decision cited suspicions of various fishing practices that deplete marine resources and the subleasing of licenses to foreign vessels.

In November 2021, the Somaliland Minister of Livestock and Fisheries, accompanied by the Somaliland Ambassador to Djibouti and the Djibouti Minister of Agriculture, visited a fish processing plant in Djibouti.

In June 2022, urban residents in Somaliland reportedly increased their fish consumption due to rising meat prices and growing awareness of its health benefits. However, only about 5% of coastal marine resources were utilized. To address this, the Ministry of Livestock and Fisheries Development supported the Maydh port reconstruction project.

In February 2024, the Somaliland Minister of Fisheries and Coastal Development, Rabi Abdi Mohamed, conducted an official visit to Taiwan to meet with Deputy Foreign Minister Remus Li-Kuo Chen. The discussions centered on enhancing bilateral cooperation, focusing on Taiwanese investment in Somaliland's fisheries and providing technical training for ministry staff.

In December 2024, Irro, who took office as President of Somaliland, split the Ministry of Livestock and Fishery Development into the Ministry of Livestock and Rural Development and the Ministry of Fishery and Marine Resources.

In May 2026, the Somaliland Ministry of Fisheries and Marine Resources distributed modern equipment to small-scale fishers in Berbera. The package included solar-powered generators and freezers designed to improve fish preservation and storage. This initiative aimed to strengthen the local coastal economy and reduce post-harvest losses for small businesses.

== Ministers ==
Image	Minister	Ministry	Took office	Left office
	Mahamud Abi Ali (Bayr); Maxamuud Cabi Cali (Bayr)	Ministry of Fisheries; Wasiirka Kalluumaysiga	1991	1992
	Mohamed Mohamoud Farah (Oday)	Ministry of Fisheries and Coastal Affairs; Wasaarada Kaluumaysiga iyo Xeebaha	September 1995	
	Ali Mohamed Hasan (Ali Qoorseef)	Minister of Fisheries and Marine Resources; Wasaaradda Kalluumaysiga iyo khayraadka Badda	2007	July 2010
	Mohamed Yasin Hassan; Maxamed Yaasiin Xasan	Ministry of Fisheries, Natural Resources and Ports; Wasaaradda Kalluumaysiga, Khayraadka Dabiiciga ah iyo Dekedaha	July 2010	January 2011
	Abdillahi Jama Osman (Geeljire); Cabdillaahi Jaamac Cismaan (Geeljire)	Ministry of Fisheries and Marine Resources; Wasaaradda Kalluumaysiga iyo Khayraadka Badda	January 2011	June 2013
	Ali Jama Farah (Buureed); Cali Jaamac Faarax (Buureed)	Ministry of Fisheries and Marine Resources; Wasaaradda Kalluumaysiga iyo Khayraadka Badda	June 2013	
	Hassan Mohammed Ali (Gafadhi); Xasan Maxamed Cali Gaafaadhi	Ministry of Livestock and Fishery Development; Wasaaradda Xannaanada Xoolaha iyo Horumarinta Kalluumaysiga	December 2017	December 2019
	Said Sulub Mohamed; Siciid Sulub Maxamed	Ministry of Livestock and Fishery Development	December 2019	
	Rabi Abdi Mohamed; Raabi Cabdi Maxamed	Ministry of Fisheries and Coastal Development; Wasaaradda Kalluumaysiga iyo Horumarinta Xeebaha	November 2023	
	Ali Jama Farah (Buureed); Cali Jamac Buureed	Ministry of Fisheries and Marine Resources; Wasiirka Kaluumaysiga	December 2024	
