= Hussein Ahmed Aideed =

Somaliland politician

- Xuseen Axmed Caydiid
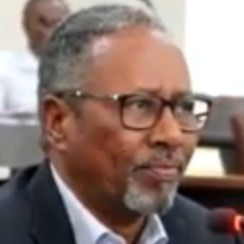

Minister of Justice
- In office June 2011 – October 2015
- President: Ahmed Mohamed Mohamoud
- Preceded by: Ismail Mumin Are
- Succeeded by: Ahmed Farah Adarre

Personal details
- Occupation: Politician

Hussein Ahmed Aideed (Somali: Xuseen Axmed Caydiid) is a Somaliland politician. He has served as Minister of Public Works, Minister of Justice, and as a member of the House of Representatives.

== Biography ==
Hussein Ahmed Aideed hails from the Isaaq clan, specifically the Arab, Musa Abokor sub-clan.

=== Public Works Minister (1st term) ===
In July 2010, President Ahmed Mohamed Silanyo announced his new cabinet and selected Hussein Ahmed Aideed as Minister of Public Works and Transport.

=== Justice Minister ===
In June 2011, President Ahmed Mohamed Silanyo announced a cabinet reshuffle and appointed former Minister of Public Works Hussein Ahmed Aideed as Minister of Justice.

In February 2012, at an international conference on Somalia held in London, the prospect of the first formal dialogue between Somalia and Somaliland was raised, with Foreign Minister Mohamed Abdullahi Omar leading the Somaliland delegation, which also included Justice Minister Hussein Ahmed Aideed.

In January 2014, a new Ministry of Justice building was inaugurated in Hargeisa, with Minister of Justice Hussein Ahmed Aideed among those attending the opening ceremony.

In June 2014, as a Somaliland government delegation passed through Hargeisa airport on its return from a trip to South Africa, Hussein Ahmed Aideed, who had just come back, the independent media avoided recording his remarks during the arrival press coverage, prompting him to comment briefly, “If you do not want my news, that is fine.”

In August 2015, during major water-supply works in northern Hargeisa, a mass grave believed to date from the 1980s Isaaq genocide was uncovered. In response, Minister of Justice Hussein Ahmed Aideed stated that the discovery was “one of the horrific consequences of the massacres committed by the Siad Barre regime against the people of this country, and the Somaliland government, which is working to bring the perpetrators to justice, cannot escape from this tragedy.”

On 26 October 2015, Hussein Ahmed Aideed resigned from his position as Minister of Justice. He later argued that although the constitution requires a resigning minister to remain in office until a successor formally assumes the post, the ministry was abruptly taken over by military forces and his secretary was barred from entering his office. On 2 November, the new minister, Ahmed Farah Adarre, expressed his gratitude for Hussein Ahmed Aideed's past contributions during his inaugural address.

In November 2015, during a Kulmiye central council meeting held in Hargeisa, a serious internal dispute broke out over President Silanyo's support for Muse Bihi Abdi as the party's presidential candidate, prompting many senior figures to break with the pro–Bihi faction, and Hussein Ahmed Aideed, speaking for the Kulmiye Alliance, described the central council meeting as a “haram” gathering and said that anything resulting from it would also be haram.

=== To the Waddani party ===
In October 2016, Hussein Ahmed Aideed protested the selection of Muse Bihi Abdi as the ruling party's presidential candidate and, together with several other senior figures, left the governing party to join the opposition Waddani Party.

In February 2017, Hussein Ahmed Aideed argued that contemporary Somaliland closely resembled China during the Cultural Revolution when the “Gang of Four” manipulated Chairman Mao Zedong and distorted the country's political course, implicitly criticising President Silanyo's inner circle.

In November 2017, Hussein Ahmed Aideed, together with Mohamed Yasin and Osman Afgaab, alleged that parts of the 2017 Somaliland presidential election had been fraudulently manipulated in certain areas.

=== House Representative ===
In May 2018, the constitutional court swore in Hussein Ahmed Aideed — who, despite having since left the Kulmiye Party to join the opposition Waddani Party, was still entitled to a seat through Kulmiye's reserve-member allocation from the original election — as a member of parliament to fill the vacant seat left by Ibrahim Ahmed Haybe, who had died the previous month.

=== Public Works Minister (2nd term) ===
In December 2024, newly elected president Irro announced a 48-member cabinet and appointed Hussein Ahmed Aideed as Minister of Public Works, Lands and Housing. In January 2025, ministers appointed by the president received a vote of confidence in the House of Representatives, and Hussein Ahmed Aideed was approved with 63 votes.

In October 2025, the Taiwanese representative to Somaliland hosted a Taiwan National Day celebration in Hargeisa, which was attended by Foreign Minister Abdirahman Dahir Adam and former justice minister Hussein Ahmed Aideed.
