= Ministry of Local Governments (Somaliland) =

Government ministry of Somaliland

Republic of Somaliland Ministry of Local Governments and Urban Development
- Wasaaradda Dawladaha Hoose iyo Horumarinta Magaalooyinka; MLGUD
- Coat of arms of Somaliland

Ministry overview
- Formed
- Jurisdiction: Somaliland
- Headquarters: Maroodi Jeex, Hargeisa (Somaliland)
- Minister responsible: Minister
- Website: https://mlgud.govsomaliland.org/

Footnotes
- Ministry of Local Governments on Facebook

The Ministry of Local Governments and Urban Development (MLGUD) of Somaliland is the government authority mandated to formulate and implement policies, legal frameworks, and strategic plans for local governance and urban development. Its primary responsibilities include strengthening decentralization, empowering local districts, and overseeing urban infrastructure projects to ensure sustainable growth and the effective delivery of public services. The ministry coordinates various departments—such as District Development and Urban Development—and manages key initiatives like the Bulsho Project to promote community engagement, environmental sustainability, and disaster risk management, with the ultimate goal of building inclusive, safe, and resilient urban centers throughout the country.

== History ==
In February 2022, the Ministry of Environment and Rural Development was split into the Ministry of Environment and Climate Change and the Ministry of Rural Development by presidential decree.

On 8 January 2025, President Abdirahman Mohamed Abdullahi, who assumed office in December 2024, established the Ministry of Local Governments and Urban Development to strengthen decentralization and enable citizens to access government services within their localities. This ministry has also taken on responsibility for rural development.

== Ministers ==
Image	Minister	Term start	Term end
	Hassan Ahmed Duale; Xasan Axmed Ducaale	December 2024	Incumbent
