= Mohamed Ahmed Mohamud =

Somali politician

Member of Parliament of Somaliland
- Incumbent
- Assumed office 1999
- Constituency: Sool

Personal details
- Born: Somalia
- Party: United Peoples' Democratic Party
- Nickname: Dhakool

Mohamed Ahmed Mohamud (Somali: Maxamed Axmed Maxamuud) a.k.a. Dhakool is a Member of Parliament of Somaliland.

Mohamed have been accused of having links to Puntland and SSC and been involved in several attacks on high profile persons in the Sool region in Somaliland. Some of the attacks he is accused of having connection to:

- On July 1, 2011, Nadifo Mohamed Ol-ujoog, Chairman of Sool Women's Association was shot and wounded.
- On March 7, 2011, Mohamed Mohamud Hirsi (Asad) (late husband of Nadifo), leader of Central Investigative Unit in Sool region was killed and his deputy Arab Warsame was injured.
- In November 2009 Cornel Ahmed Dahir, who was in charge of the police in Sool region was killed by a roadside bomb.
