= Ahmed Haji Ali Adami =

Somali politician

Ahmed Haji Ali Adami أحمد حاج علي عديمي
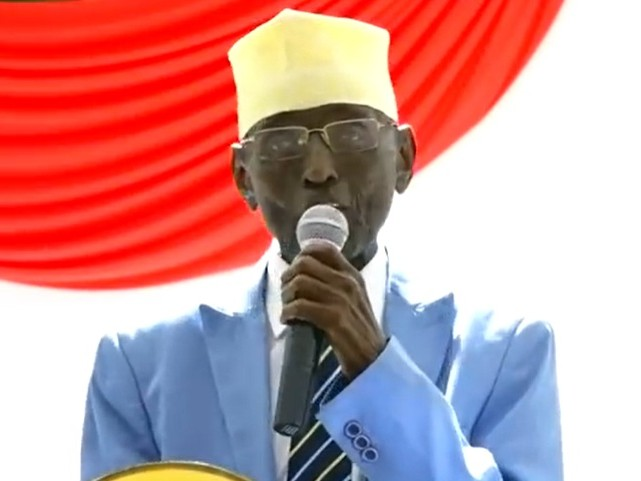

Minister of Defence
- In office 27 July 2010 – 14 December 2017
- President: Ahmed Mohamed Mohamoud
- Preceded by: Abdillahi Ali Ibrahim
- Succeeded by: Isse Ahmed Abdalle

Chairman of National Electoral Commission
- In office 25 February 2002 – 19 February 2007
- President: Mohamed Haji Ibrahim Egal; Dahir Riyale Kahin
- Preceded by: Office established
- Succeeded by: Mohamed Yusuf Ahmed

Ahmed Haji Ali Adami (Somali: Axmed Xaaji Cali Cadami) is a Somali politician who served as the Minister of Defence of Somaliland from July 2010 to October 2015. He formerly served as the Chairman of National Electoral Commission from 2002 to 2007. He is from the Warsangali clan.

== Biography ==
Ahmed Haji Ali Adami is from Badhan District. He is from the Ogeyslabe sub-clan of the Warsangali clan.

Before the Somali Civil War, Ahmed Haji Ali Adami served in Somalia's government as the Director (Manager) of Somalia's ports administration.

=== Chairman of the National Electoral Commission ===
In January 2002, Ahmed Haji Ali Adami became Chairman of Somaliland's National Electoral Commission after being proposed by the Somaliland House of Elders (Guurti). This was because he was a seasoned administrator who had served as the head of the Somali Port Authority, Somaliland's minister of health, and Somaliland's minister of labor. This electoral commission successfully delivered Somaliland's first series of democratic elections, beginning with the local elections on 15 December 2002, followed by the presidential election on 14 April 2003 and the House of Representatives election on 29 September 2005.

On 15 December 2002, local council elections were held in Somaliland. On the night of 17 December, the Chairman of the National Electoral Commission, Ahmed Haji Ali Adami, said that around 75 percent of the votes had been counted so far, and that because the official results would only be announced after the remaining votes were fully tallied, there could be a delay in the declaration of the final results.

=== Defence Minister ===
In July 2010, after becoming president, Ahmed Mohamed Mohamoud “Silanyo” announced his cabinet and appointed Ahmed Haji Ali Adami as Somaliland's Minister of Defence.

Amid unrest in Buuhoodle in August 2010, Ahmed Haji Ali Adami said that while the government supported every effort and commitment by local traditional leaders to pursue peace talks, the elders’ role was to submit their recommendations to the government, and that the final decision—and its implementation—belonged to the government itself.

In January 2012, a government delegation led by Ahmed Haji Ali Adami visited Hingalol in the Sanaag region. Adami urged local elders and community leaders to prioritize maintaining security, stressing that the development of the area needed could only be achieved through stability, and he also pledged to convey their various requests to the Somaliland government.

In August 2012, Ahmed Haji Ali Adami said that a ceasefire had been reached between Somaliland and the SSC organization around Buuhoodle, that Somaliland forces would pull back to the Qorulugud area, and that prisoners previously held by Somaliland forces would also be released.

In January 2015, a government delegation led by the Minister of the Presidency visited Garadag in the Sanaag region, with Ahmed Haji Ali Adami accompanying the delegation.

In February 2015, the Puntland-based media outlet Garowe Online reported that Somaliland forces and clan militia loyal to the self-declared Khatumo administration engaged in a brief clash near Buuhoodle. In response, Adami said that “there was no truth” to reports of fighting in the Sool region, explaining that the Somaliland military had no orders to engage in combat and noting that traditional elders from Buuhoodle were in Hargeisa for peace talks aimed at stabilizing the area, so the military's actions should not be described as a battle.

In June 2016, Ahmed Haji Ali Adami explained that Badhan District is part of Somaliland and that voter registration would be conducted there in the same manner as in other regions of the country, stressing that there were no serious problems apart from a lack of public awareness; regarding protests in the area, he added that harmful individuals could be found anywhere, that not everyone was well-intentioned, and that the individual in question had been detained by his own clan and was then under control.

In May 2017, Ahmed Haji Ali Adami told Somaliland's parliament that rising prices had made living conditions increasingly difficult for soldiers of the Somaliland armed forces.

In October 2017, in connection with the establishment of a Turkish military base in Mogadishu, Ahmed Haji Ali Adami said that “we are not the enemy of anyone, and what is important is to understand the purpose for which the base will be operated. The military base that we are developing together with the United Arab Emirates already exists, and one of the main challenges there is to accelerate the opening of the military base to be established in Berbera.”

In December 2017, newly inaugurated President Muse Bihi Abdi announced his cabinet appointments, naming Isse Ahmed Yusuf as Somaliland's Minister of Defence.

=== Former Defence Minister ===
In August 2018, Ahmed Haji Ali Adami warned that if Somaliland were to go to war with Puntland, it could trigger unexpected problems for Somaliland.

In July 2019, Ahmed Haji Ali Adami met with Ali Khalif Galaydh in Hargeisa and called on the Somaliland government to convene a large conference for clans living in the Sool, Sanaag, and Cayn regions, in order to strengthen Somaliland's peace and unity and to address the grievances those clans held toward the government.

=== Death ===
On 3 February 2023, Ahmed Haji Ali Adami died in Hargeisa.

== See also ==
- National Electoral Commission (Somaliland)
- Cabinet of Somaliland
- Ministry of Defence (Somaliland)

Political offices
Preceded by Office established	Chairman of National Electoral Commission; 2002-2007	Succeeded by Mohamed Yusuf Ahmed
Preceded by Abdillahi Ali Ibrahim	Minister of Defence; 2010-2017	Succeeded by Isse Ahmed Abdalle
