= Abdillahi Ali Ibrahim =

Somaliland politician (died 2021)

- Cabdillaahi Cali Ibraahim
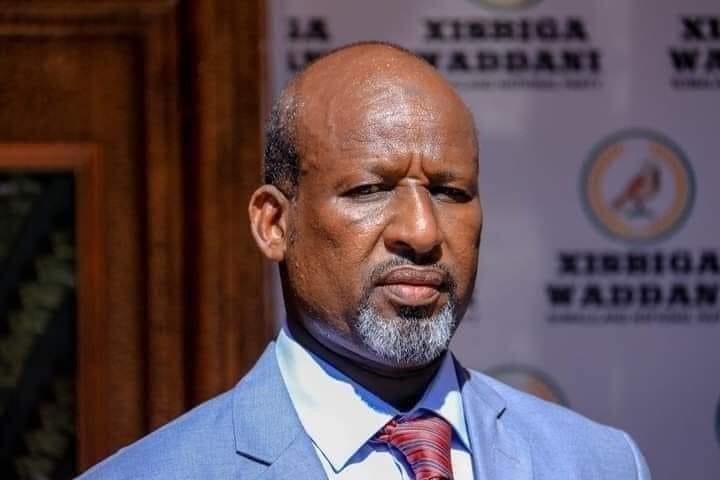

Minister of Defence of Somaliland
- President: Dahir Riyale Kahin
- Succeeded by: Suleiman Warsame Guled

Personal details
- Died: 24 October 2021 Hargeisa, Somaliland

Abdillahi Ali Ibrahim (Somali: Cabdillaahi Cali Ibraahim) was a Somaliland politician who served as Minister of Defence during the presidency of Dahir Riyale Kahin. He remained active in public affairs after leaving office and commented on security developments in Somaliland until shortly before his death in 2021.

== Defence Minister ==
In October 2007, Abdillahi Ali Ibrahim stated that Somaliland forces defending Las Anod had been attacked by Puntland forces, resulting in six fatalities, but that the attack was repelled and six Puntland soldiers were taken prisoner, while vehicles, weapons, and ammunition were seized.

In May 2008, President Dahir Riyale Kahin appointed a ten-member organizing committee for the 17th anniversary of Somaliland’s restoration of sovereignty, among whom was Abdillahi Ali Ibrahim.

In June 2008, Somaliland forces arrested 60 people near Las Makan close to the Las Khorey district, including two foreigners of Yemeni and Chinese nationality; Somaliland’s minister of defence, Abdillahi Ali Ibrahim, explained that they had illegally entered a restricted area while searching for oil and mineral resources, although Puntland’s minister of security claimed they were fishermen permitted by the Puntland government.

In July 2008, amid reports that foreign nationals were being held hostage by a pirate group near Las Khorey, Somaliland’s national forces moved into the area in an attempt to rescue the captives and took control of Las Khorey without fighting; later, after reports emerged that Somaliland forces had left Las Khorey, Puntland deployed strong forces toward Las Khorey and nearby towns, although Somaliland’s minister of defence, Abdillahi Ali Ibrahim, immediately and strongly denied that any Somaliland troops had withdrawn from Las Khorey.

On 15 August 2009, President Dahir Riyale Kahin dismissed Abdillahi Ali Ibrahim from his post as minister of defence and appointed Suleiman Warsame Guled as his replacement.

== Former defence minister ==
In June 2019, Abdillahi Ali Ibrahim called on the Somaliland government and politicians from the Togdheer region to take an immediate and cautious response to the killing of a police officer in Fiqi Ayub, Togdheer, and stated that he himself was willing to travel to the area and offer whatever assistance he could to help resolve the situation.

== Death ==
On 24 October 2021, Abdillahi Ali Ibrahim died in Hargeisa.
