= Milgo Mohamed Elmi =

Somali politician

- Milgo Maxamed Cilmi
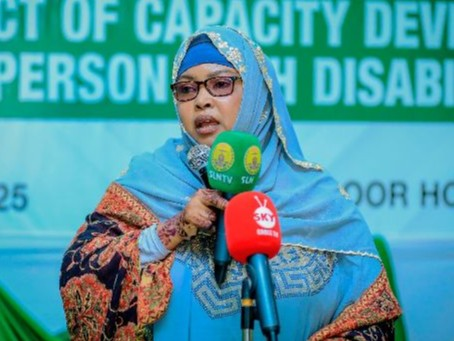

Minister of Employment, Social Affairs and Family of the Republic of Somaliland
- Incumbent
- Assumed office December 2024
- President: Abdirahman Mohamed Abdullahi

Personal details
- Party: Waddani

Milgo Mohamed Elmi (Somali: Milgo Maxamed Cilmi), also known by her nickname Sanbalooshe, is a Somali politician who is currently serving as the Minister of Employment, Social Affairs and Family of the Republic of Somaliland (MoLSAF).

== Career ==
Milgo belongs to the Arab sub-clan of the Isaaq clan.

In August 2017, Milgo was appointed as a member of the Media and Awareness Committee (Somali: Guddiga Warbaahinta iyo Wacyigelinta) of the opposition Waddani party. The committee was one of nine established by the party's chairman and presidential candidate, Abdirahman Mohamed Abdullahi (Irro), to organize and accelerate the party's activities during the election campaign season.

In November 2021, during the second general convention of the Waddani party held in Hargeisa, Milgo was elected as one of the six vice chairpersons of the party. She was notably the only woman included in the party's top leadership at the time. Following her election, she expressed her gratitude to the party's presidential candidate, Abdirahman Mohamed Abdullahi (Irro), crediting him for her successful appointment.

In August 2022, serving as the Deputy Chairwoman of the Waddani party, Milgo publicly accused the government of arbitrarily arresting party officials from their homes. She stated that the detained individuals had been transferred to the Awdal region without being brought before the judiciary.

=== Minister of Employment, Social Affairs and Family (MoLSAF) ===
In December 2024, Milgo was appointed as the Minister of Employment, Social Affairs and Family of the Republic of Somaliland by President Abdirahman Mohamed Abdullahi Irro. Her appointment was marked as a significant step for gender representation in Somaliland politics, as she was one of only three women appointed to the 28-member cabinet. Although she was considered a potential candidate for the Ministry of Health, President Irro specifically appointed her to the MoLSAF so that she could focus on serving women and vulnerable populations.

In January 2025, her appointment was officially approved by the Somaliland House of Representatives with an overwhelming majority of 65 votes.

In January 2025, shortly after taking office, she began initiatives focused on social inclusion. She hosted a graduation ceremony for a sign language training program to promote employment opportunities and protection for people with disabilities.

== See also ==
- Cabinet of Somaliland
- Politics of Somaliland
