= Beeyo Macaan =

- Village
- Location in Somaliland Beeyo Macaan (Somaliland)
- Coordinates: 10°4′18.7″N 45°50′50.8″E
- Country: Somaliland
- Region: Sahil
- District: Sheikh District
- Time zone: UTC+3 (EAT)

Beeyo Macaan (Beenyo-macaan, Beeyo Macan, Benyo Macan, Biyo Macaan) is a town in Sheikh District, in the Sahil region of Somaliland.

A village with the same name exists in Awdal.

== Residents ==
Reer Yunis branch of the Habr Je'lo branch of the Isaaq, and Ahmed Farah branch of the Habr Je'lo branch of Isaaq live in the area.

== Recent history ==
In September 2017, Maxamed Jibriil Cilmi (Cambe) was appointed Garaad at Beeyo Macaan.

In November 2019, it was announced that the two communities at odds in Beeyo Macaan had reconciled.

In July 2020, a deadly battle occurred between two clans. A source reported they are Habr Je'lo and Issa Musa. According to another source, it was a battle between Reer Yoonis (Habar-Jeelo) and Ahmed Farah (Habar-Jeelo). Aqil Abdullahi Abdi-Daray, one of the traditional leaders and elders of the Qorilugud district, was murdered.

== See also ==
- Administrative divisions of Somaliland
- Regions of Somaliland
- Districts of Somaliland
