= Ahmed Mumin Seed =

Somali politician

Ahmed Mumin Seed أحمد مؤمن سيد
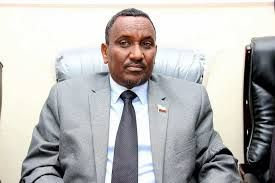

Minister of Agriculture
- In office 14 December 2017 – 2 September 2021
- President: Muse Bihi Abdi
- Preceded by: Mohamed Dahir Ibrahim
- Succeeded by: Mohamed Haji Osman

Personal details
- Born: Borama, British Somaliland (now Somaliland)
- Party: Waddani

Ahmed Mumin Seed (Somali: Axmed Mumin Seed) is a Somali politician, who served as the Somaliland's Minister of Agriculture from 14 December 2017 to 2 September 2021.

== Biography ==
Ahmed Mumin Seed is from the Awdal region. And he is from the Gadabuursi clan.

=== UDUB party's regional secretary ===
Around 2004, Ahmed Mumin Seed was appointed as the UDUB party's regional secretary for Awdal region.

In October 2005, Ahmed Mumin Seed held a press conference in Borama in which he attributed UDUB's victory in the parliamentary elections to the party's longstanding support base in Awdal, its internal discipline and awareness campaigns, and the restraint and civility shown by its supporters; he congratulated both successful and unsuccessful candidates and urged them to avoid personal attacks and maintain a calm and constructive political attitude.

In January 2008, Ahmed Mumin Seed, then the UDUB party's regional secretary for Awdal, held a press conference in Borama together with Barkhad Omar, the party's deputy representative for Awdal, where he defended the performance of President Dahir Riyale Kahin, arguing that although the president was from Awdal he had not favored his home region but had made fair, nationwide decisions, and that opposition criticism of his governance was therefore misplaced.

=== Executive committee of UCID ===
In November 2008, Ahmed Mumin Seed held a press conference announcing that he had left the ruling UDUB party and joined the opposition UCID party. He cited pressure from supporters, opaque internal personnel decisions, and unhealthy party management as reasons for his departure, while emphasizing that it was ultimately a personal decision. UCID's Awdal representative welcomed him, and around 150 of his supporters reportedly followed him into UCID. It was noted at the time that, whereas members had previously been expelled from UDUB, it was unusual for a prominent politician to leave the party voluntarily.

In April 2009, the UCID party chairman Faysal Ali Warabe was reportedly threatened with death by the police commander in Kalabaydh and a journalist accompanying him had his camera destroyed. In response, Ahmed Mumin Seed, then the UCID party' s regional representative for Awdal and Selel, condemned the incident as evidence of local police misconduct, a lack of central governance, and a violation of democratic norms.

In April 2011, Ahmed Mumin Seed, serving as a member of the executive committee of the opposition UCID party, condemned the deputy minister of finance for attempting, while the finance minister was abroad, to use soldiers to remove the national accountant from Awdal region from his office and for similar efforts to sideline other civil servants from Awdal, arguing that these actions revealed a deeper structural problem within the Silanyo administration.

=== Establishment of the Waddani party ===
In 2012, the Waddani political association was formed to qualify as a national party in the Somaliland municipal elections. At its April party congress, Abdirahman Mohamed Abdullahi "Irro" was elected as party chairman, while Ahmed Mumin Seed was chosen as the first of five deputy chairmen.

=== Waddani to Kulmiye ===
In October 2016, the Waddani party held an internal contest for its vice-presidential candidate, in which Mohamed Aw-Ali Abdi received 580 votes and defeated Ahmed Mumin Seed, who secured 44 votes. In February 2017, Ahmed Mumin Seed left the Waddani party and joined the ruling Kulmiye party. In May 2017, Ahmed Mumin Seed explained why he had left the Waddani party and why many people were moving from Waddani to the Kulmiye party, criticizing party chairman Abdirahman Mohamed Abdullahi "Irro" as a leader who lacked decisiveness.

=== Agriculture minister ===
On 14 December 2017, newly elected President Muse Bihi Abdi announced his cabinet and appointed Ahmed Mumin Seed as Minister of Agricultural Development.

On 2 September 2021, President Muse Bihi Abdi carried out a cabinet reshuffle in which Ahmed Mumin Seed was dismissed from his ministerial post. On 11 September, handover ceremonies were held across several Somaliland ministries, and at the Ministry of Agriculture Mohamed Haji Osman took over the ministerial post from Ahmed Mumin Seed.

=== Former agriculture minister ===
In February 2022, Ahmed Mumin Seed criticized the opposition Waddani party for prioritizing electioneering over addressing the severe shortages of water and food facing the population.

=== Kulmiye to Waddani ===
On 10 March 2023, Hadhwanaag News reported that Ahmed Mumin Seed had been expelled from the ruling Kulmiye party because he had posted photos on social media showing him with senior figures from the opposition Waddani party and had recently criticized pro-government rallies held in major Somaliland cities. On 11 March, the spokesman of the Kulmiye party announced that Ahmed Mumin Seed was no longer a member of the Kulmiye party.

On 16 March, Somaliland Vice President Abdirahman Saylici sharply criticized both the SSC-Khatumo elders council, which led the Dhulbahante uprising in Las Anod, and the Speaker of the Somaliland House of Representatives for defending them. In response, Ahmed Mumin Seed, who hails from the same region and clan as the Vice President, argued that the Speaker was merely representing the demands of his home constituency, while the Vice President was failing to adequately reflect the views of his own local community.

In May 2023, Ahmed Mumin Seed rejoined the Waddani party.

== See also ==
- Peace, Unity, and Development Party
- Ministry of Agriculture (Somaliland)
- List of Somalis

Political offices
Preceded by Mohamed Dahir Ibrahim	Minister of Agriculture; 2017–2021
Preceded by {{{before}}}	Incumbent
