= Mustafe Mohamoud Ali =

Somali politician

Mustafe Mohamoud Ali مصطفى محمود علي
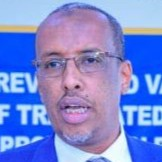

Minister of Justice
- In office 1 December 2019 – 10 January 2021
- President: Muse Bihi Abdi
- Preceded by: Abdirisaq Ali Abdi Salah
- Succeeded by: Saleban Warsame Guled

Personal details
- Born: Hingalol, Somaliland
- Party: Peace, Unity, and Development Party

Mustafe Mohamoud Ali Bile (Somali: Mustafe Maxamuud Cali Bile) is a Somali politician, who is currently serving as the Minister of Justice of Somaliland.

== Biography ==
Mustafe Mohamoud Ali Bile hails from the Bah Ogayslabe branch of the Warsangeli clan.

=== Deputy Minister of Parliamentary Relations ===
On 4 December 2016, President Ahmed Mohamed Mohamoud Silanyo appointed Mustafe Mohamoud Ali Bile as Deputy Minister of Parliamentary Relations, Research and Technology.

=== Director General of Trade Ministry ===
On 31 July 2018, President Muse Bihi Abdi appointed Mustafe Mohamoud Ali Bile as Director General to the Ministry of Trade, Industry and Tourism.

In October 2019, Mustafe Mohamoud Ali Bile stated that foreign nationals from China, Germany, Portugal, Egypt, Sudan, and Yemen who had been operating illegally in Tog Wajaale were arrested.

=== Justice Minister ===
In December 2019, the new President Muse Bihi Abdi announced a cabinet reshuffle and appointed Mustafe Mohamoud Ali Bile as Minister of Justice, replacing Abdirisaq Ali Abdi Salah.

In September 2020, Mustafe Mohamoud Ali Bile was spending an extended period in El Afweyn as part of Interior Minister Mohamed Kahin’s peace delegation, while the Ministry of Justice was experiencing serious internal conflicts; he suspended the Director-General’s authorized signature because the official had exceeded his legal powers by signing agreements and contracts with private companies.

=== Employment Minister ===
On 10 January 2021, Somaliland President Muse Bihi Abdi appointed Mustafe Mohamoud Ali Bile as Minister of Employment, Social Affairs and Family in his cabinet, replacing Hinda Jama Hirsi Mahamed.

In February 2021, the Somaliland Ministry of Employment Affairs launched a Covid-19 poverty alleviation program in Hargeisa, and Minister Mustafe Mohamoud Ali Bile said that the cash payments to low-income families were too small but better than nothing, adding that they hoped to increase such payments for poor communities affected by Covid-19.

=== Public Works Minister ===
On 4 January 2023, President Muse Bihi Abdi dismissed Minister of Public Works and Housing Abdillahi Abokor Osman and appointed Minister of Employment and Social Affairs Mustafe Mohamoud Ali Bile as the new minister. The successor to the Employment Minister was Ali Omar Mohamed, the former manager of Berbera Port.

In September 2023, the Ministry of Public Works, led by Mustafe Mohamoud Ali Bile, developed Somaliland’s first regulatory procedure for construction quality control.

On 14 December 2024, the new president, Abdirahman Mohamed Abdullahi Irro, appointed Hussein Ahmed Aydeed Warsame as Minister of Public Works, Lands and Housing in his first cabinet line-up.

== See also ==
- Ministry of Justice (Somaliland)
- Politics of Somaliland
- List of Somaliland politicians

Political offices
| Preceded by Abdirisaq Ali Abdi Salah | Minister of Justice; 2019–present | Succeeded by Saleban Warsame Guled |
