= Politics of Somaliland =

Political system of Somaliland

- National Emblem of Somaliland
- Polity type: Unitary presidential constitutional republic
- Constitution: Constitution of Somaliland

Legislative branch
- Name: Parliament
- Type: Bicameral
- Meeting place: Somaliland Parliament Place
- Upper house
- Name: House of Elders
- Presiding officer: Suleiman Mohamoud Adan
- Lower house
- Name: House of Representatives
- Presiding officer: Yasin Haji Mohamoud, Speaker of the House of Representatives

Executive branch
- Head of state and government
- Title: President
- Currently: Abdirahman Mohamed Abdullahi
- Appointer: Direct popular vote
- Cabinet
- Current cabinet: Cabinet of Somaliland
- Headquarters: Presidential Palace - Qasriga Madaxtooyada JSL
- Ministries: 23

Judicial branch
- Name: Judiciary
- Supreme Court
- Chief judge: Adan Haji Ali
- Seat: Supreme Court Building

The politics of Somaliland take place within a hybrid system of governance, which, under the Somaliland constitution, combines traditional and western institutions. The constitution separates government into an executive branch, a legislative branch, and a judicial branch, each of which functions independently from the others.

== History ==
For its first twelve years, Somaliland had no political parties but instead followed more traditional clan-based forms of political organization. Political parties were introduced during the presidential elections and it was hoped that the recent parliamentary elections would help to usher in a representative system without allowing representation to be overtly clan-based.

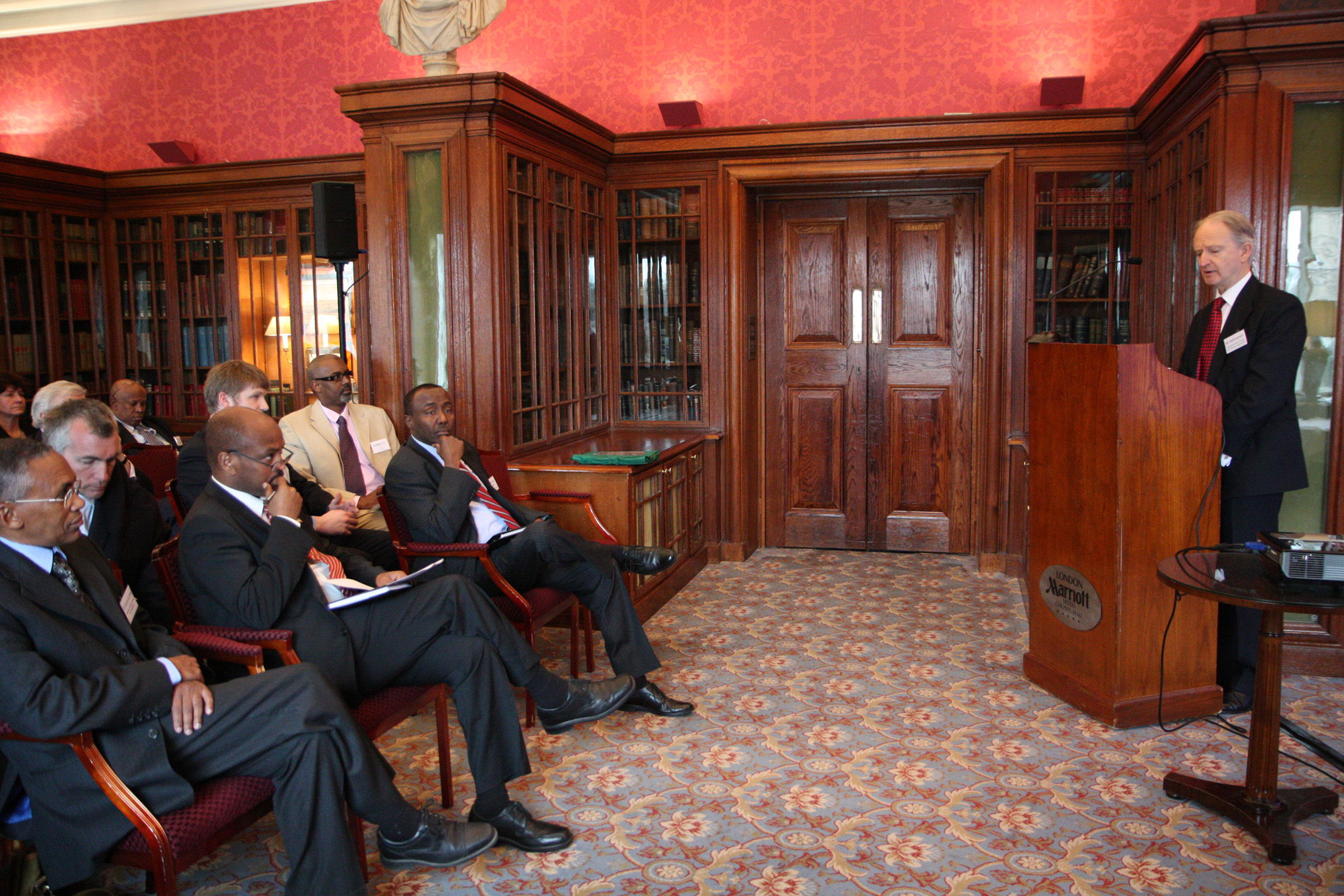
Somaliland Investment Conference in London, 2011

District elections then held determined which parties were allowed to contest the parliamentary and presidential elections, where a party was required to demonstrate at least twenty percent of the popular vote from four out of the six regions. This was designed to ensure that parties would not organize around ethnic lines. Three parties were selected to submit presidential candidates: the United Democratic Peoples' Party (UDUB), Kulmiye, and the Party for Justice and Welfare (UCID). On April 14, 2003, 488,543 voters participated in the presidential elections, which ran more or less smoothly. The result was a slim eighty vote controversial victory for UDUB over the Kulmiye, complicated by allegations of ballot stuffing against the incumbent UDUB. Despite calls for the Kulmiye to form a rival government, the party's leadership did not do so, instead choosing to abide by the Supreme Court ruling that declared UDUB's victory. Despite minor demonstrations, the transition to the presidency of Dahir Riyale Kahin proceeded peacefully. A traditional system of governance consisted of clan elders who go by titles such as sultans, guurti or akils. They usually ordered the paying of diya, which is a payment system for any grievances, or dealt in arbitration matters.

== System of government ==
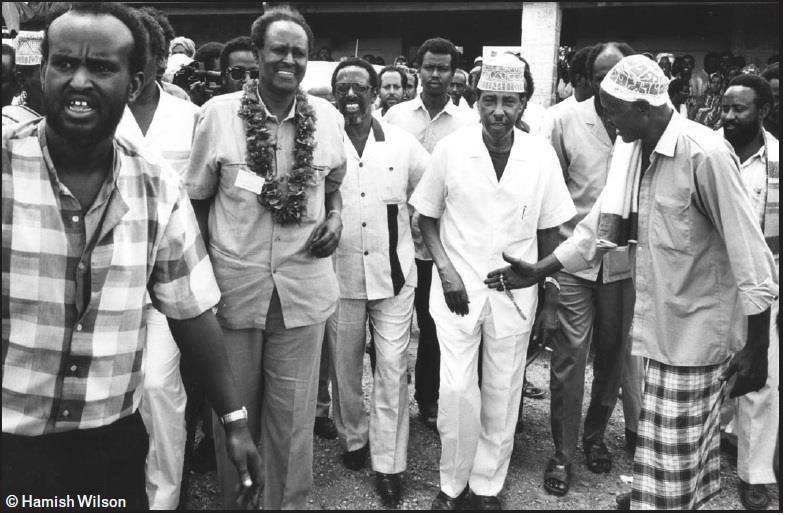
The outgoing president, Abdirahman Ahmed Ali Tuur, leaves the hall alongside newly elected President Muhammad Haji Ibrahim Egal. Abdirahman Ahmed Ali Tuur is being congratulated by an elder on his decision to accept the outcome of the election and stand down peacefully after several days intense debate and negotiation.

Somaliland has a hybrid system of governance combining traditional and western institutions. In a series of inter-clan conferences, culminating in the Borama Conference in 1993, a qabil (clan or community) system of government was constructed, which consisted of an Executive, with a President, Vice President, and legislative government; a bicameral Legislature; and an independent judiciary. The traditional Somali elderates (guurti) was incorporated into the governance structure and formed the upper house, responsible for managing internal conflicts. Government became in essence a "power-sharing coalition of Somaliland's main clans," with seats in the Upper and Lower houses proportionally allocated to clans according to a pre-determined formula. In 2002, after several extensions of this interim government, Somaliland finally made the transition to multi-party democracy, with district council elections contested by six parties.

== Current situation ==
Despite setbacks in 1994 and 1996, Somaliland has managed to prosper, assisted by its trade in livestock with Saudi Arabia. According to The Economist, it is east Africa's strongest democracy.

It faces some significant problems to its continued survival. Like other Somali governments, it lacks a consistent taxation base and receives most of its support from private actors. Corruption remains a problem, women are virtually unrepresented in government, and there are growing concerns about voting patterns based on ethnic lines.

Economic development has been heavily supported by the diaspora, although lack of international recognition prevents international aid to it as a country.

== International relations ==
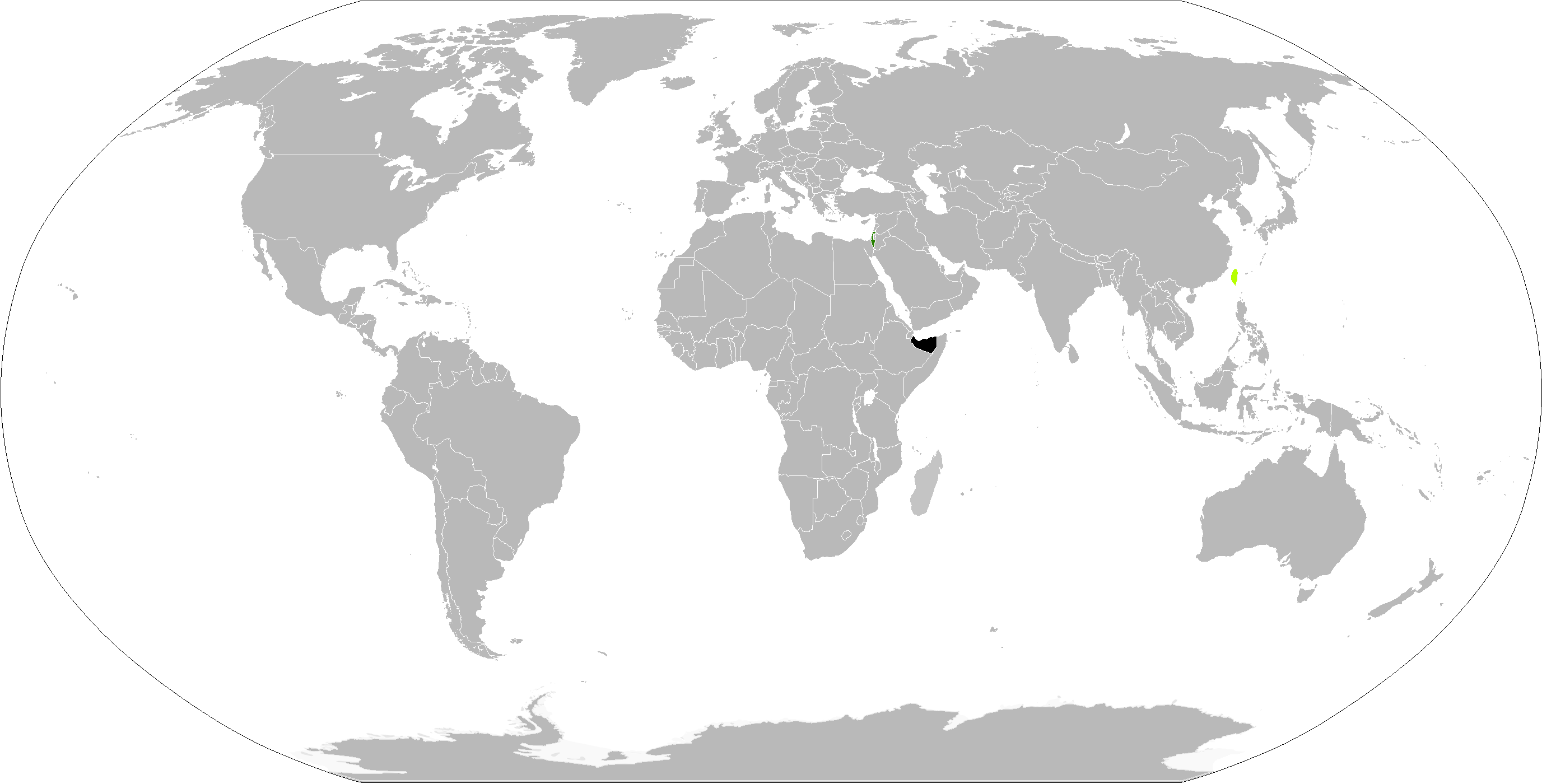
International recognition of Somaliland Somaliland States that have recognised Somaliland States whose recognition of Somaliland is unclear

In 2005 Somaliland joined the Unrepresented Nations and Peoples Organization (UNPO), an international organization dedicated to the promotion of the right to self-determination. The UN still says there are some boundaries Somaliland will have to cross before it is recognized.

=== Israel ===
Israel recognized Somaliland as an independent nation on December 27, 2025, becoming the first nation to do so. Several other nations — notably Ethiopia — are expected to follow suit.

=== Wales ===
On March 1, 2006, the Welsh Assembly invited Abdirahman Mohamed Abdullahi, the speaker of the Somaliland parliament to the opening of a new Assembly building. Mr. Abdullahi said that Somaliland sees his invitation "as a mark of recognition by the National Assembly for Wales that [Somaliland has] legitimacy." The Somali community in Wales numbers 8,000–10,000, most of whom come from Somaliland.

In December 2006 representatives of the Somaliland Parliament again attended the Welsh Assembly receiving a standing ovation from its members. Two months earlier the Assembly approved the establishment of an aid budget for Africa. These moves were approved by the UK Foreign Office and Department for International Development and are seen as an attempt by the UK to encourage and reward the authorities in its former colony while avoiding the issue of formal recognition.

== Executive branch ==
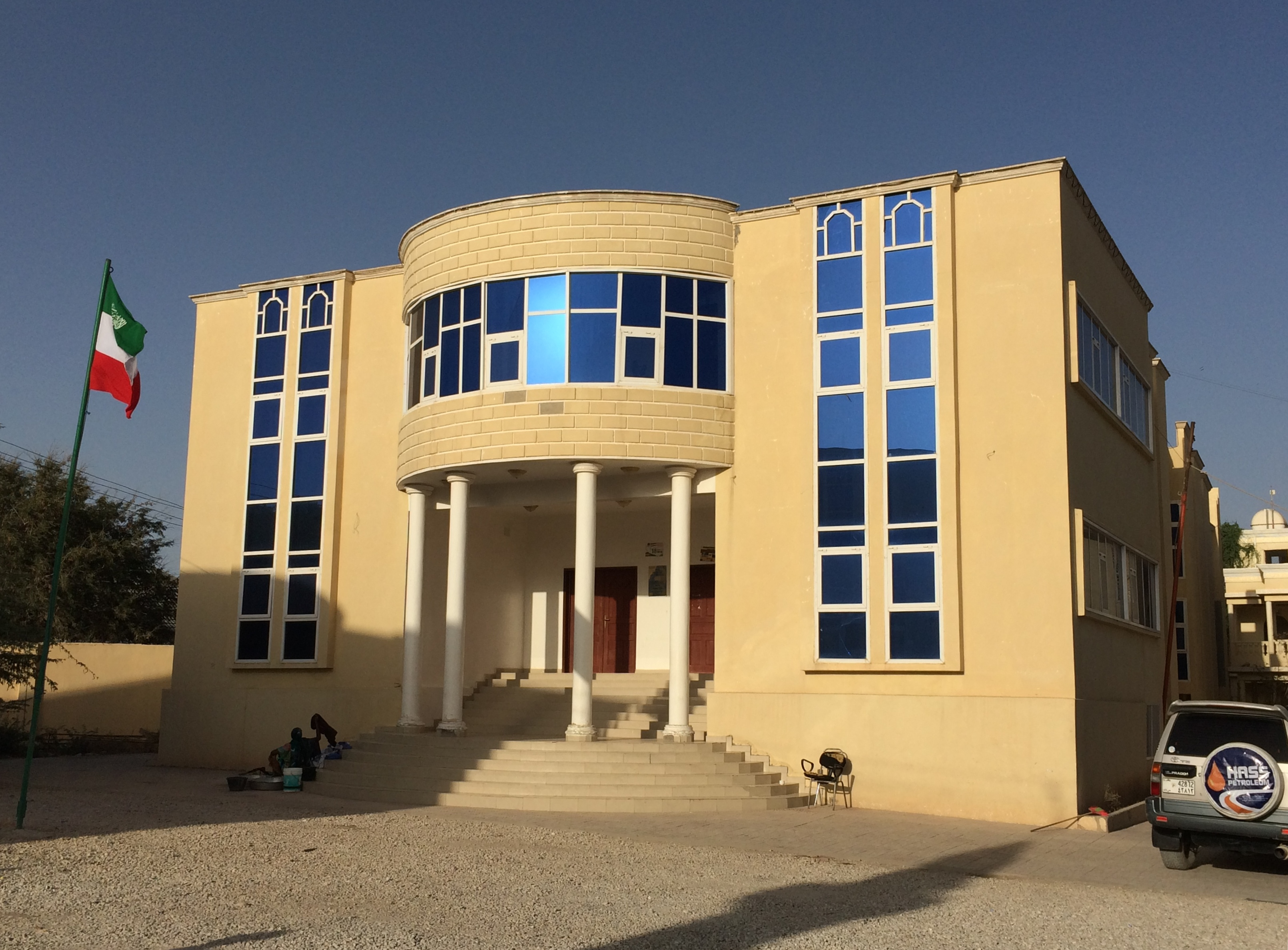
The House of Representatives in Hargeisa

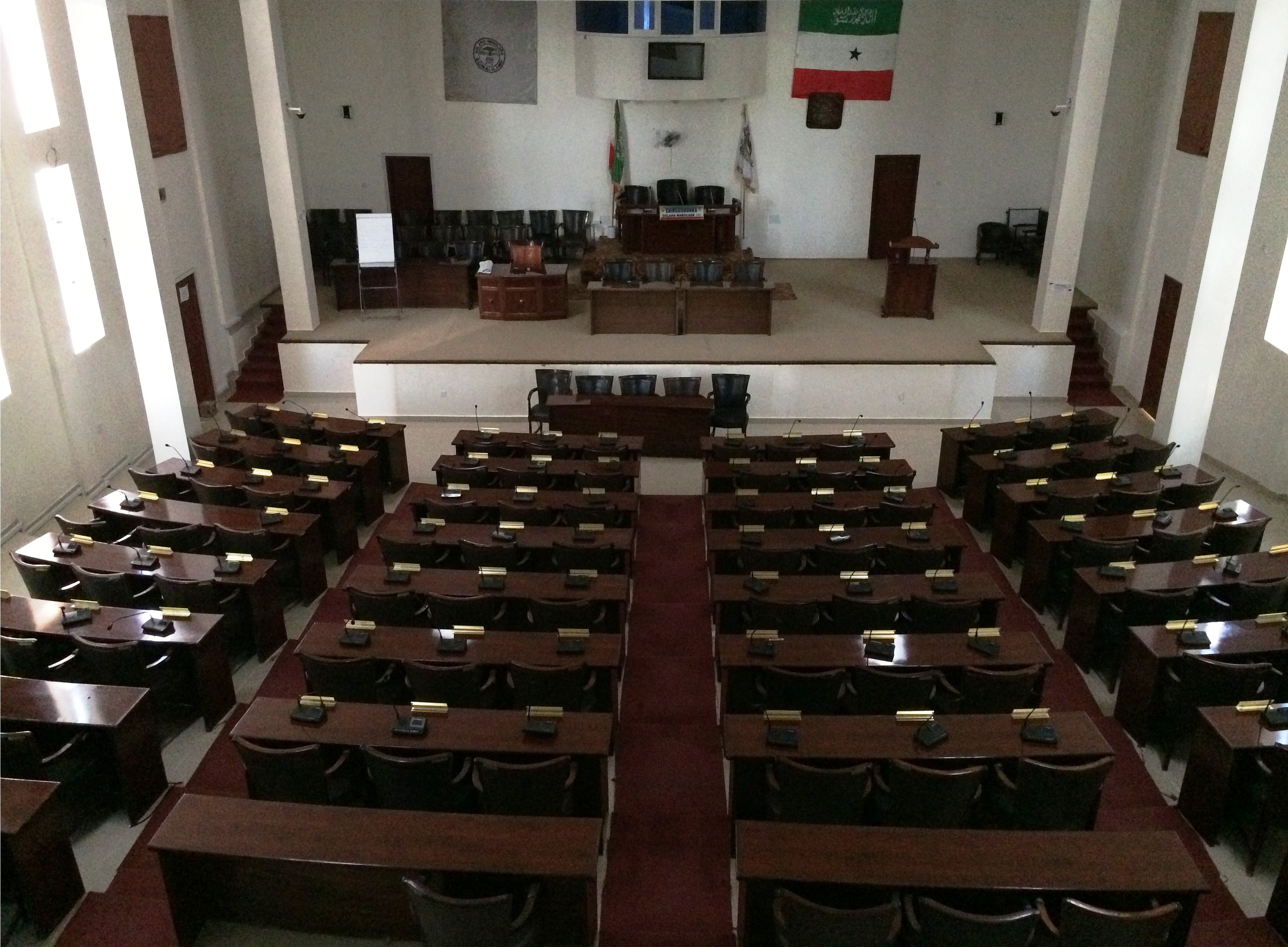
Meeting hall, House of Representatives

Main office-holders
Office	Name	Party	Since
President	Abdirahman Mohamed Abdullahi	Waddani	12 December 2024
Vice-President	Mohamed Aw-Ali Abdi	Waddani	12 December 2024

== Legislative branch ==
The Parliament (Baarlamaanka) has two chambers. The House of Representatives (Golaha Wakiilada) has 82 members, elected for a five-year term. The House of Elders (Golaha Guurtida) has 82 members, representing traditional leaders.

== Political parties and elections ==
Somaliland elects on national level a head of state (the president) and a legislature. The president is elected by the people for a five-year term. The Constitution limits the number of legal political parties to three at a time. As of 2012, the three legal political parties in the country are the Peace, Unity, and Development Party, Waddani, and For Justice and Development.

=== Presidential elections ===
Official results released on 19 November showed that Abdirahman Mohamed Abdullahi had won 63.92% of the vote, while incumbent president Muse Bihi Abdi received 34.81%. The election was considered a landslide win for the opposition and a turning point as they come to power for the first time in 14 years.

Abdullahi reacted in a conciliatory tone stating that "everyone had won" and that "no one was defeated", and that it was "an election of brotherhood, aimed at unifying the people".

The incumbent Bihi's loss was attributed to his widespread unpopularity, caused by several contentious decisions, in particular the extension of his presidential term in 2022, which led to deadly protests, and the mishandling of the dispute with the Eastern Sool.

Candidate	Running mate	Party	Votes	%
Abdirahman Mohamed Abdullahi	Mohamed Aw-Ali Abdi	Waddani	407,908	63.92
Muse Bihi Abdi	Mohamoud Hassan Saajin	Peace, Unity, and Development Party	225,519	35.34
Faysal Ali Warabe	Abdirashid Duale Diriye	For Justice and Development	4,699	0.74
Total			638,126	100.00
Valid votes			638,126	98.45
Invalid/blank votes			10,037	1.55
Total votes			648,163	100.00
Registered voters/turnout			1,227,048	52.82
Source: HO, Registered

=== By district ===
District won by Waddani
District won by Kulmiye

#	Region	District	Waddani		Kulmiye		UCID		Total votes		Margin	
#	Region	District	Votes	%	Votes	%	Votes	%	Votes	%	Votes	%
1	Awdal	Zeila	5,281	67.3%	2,446	31.2%	15	0.2%	7,843	1.2%	2,835	36.1%
2	Awdal	Lughaya	5,360	79.5%	1,206	17.9%	16	0.2%	6,745	1.0%	4,154	61.6%
3	Awdal	Borama	44,771	75.0%	13,154	22.0%	155	0.3%	59,688	9.2%	31,617	53.0%
4	Awdal	Baki	11,923	90.6%	1,085	8.2%	25	0.2%	13,166	2.0%	10,838	82.3%
5	Maroodi Jeex	Gabiley	7,559	13.7%	46,103	83.7%	234	0.4%	55,087	8.5%	38,544	70.0%
6	Maroodi Jeex	Hargeisa	130,111	54.2%	103,412	43.1%	3,090	1.3%	240,156	37.1%	26,699	11.1%
7	Maroodi Jeex	Baligubadle	4,727	46.2%	5,308	51.9%	60	0.6%	10,224	1.6%	581	5.7%
8	Maroodi Jeex	Salahlay	8,178	85.7%	979	10.3%	260	2.7%	9,542	1.5%	7,199	75.4%
9	Sahil	Berbera	13,390	41.7%	18,143	56.5%	130	0.4%	32,101	5.0%	4,753	14.8%
10	Sahil	Sheikh	5,823	50.6%	5,581	48.5%	23	0.2%	11,508	1.8%	242	2.1%
11	Togdheer	Burao	80,513	80.0%	18,642	18.5%	399	0.4%	100,642	15.5%	61,871	61.5%
12	Togdheer	Odweyne	26,918	96.7%	782	2.8%	42	0.2%	27,838	4.3%	26,136	93.9%
13	Togdheer	Buhoodle	3,410	85.9%	510	12.9%	18	0.5%	3,968	0.6%	2,900	73.1%
14	Sool	Aynabo	13,136	80.6%	2,823	17.3%	98	0.6%	16,295	2.5%	10,313	63.3%
15	Sool	Las Anod	0	–	0	–	0	–	0	–	–	–
16	Sool	Hudun	1,436	97.4%	31	2.1%	0	0.0%	1,474	0.2%	1,405	95.3%
17	Sool	Taleh	0	–	0	–	0	–	0	–	–	–
18	Sanag	Garadag	5,520	74.3%	1,818	24.5%	15	0.2%	7,425	1.1%	3,702	49.9%
19	Sanag	El Afweyn	11,314	87.7%	1,315	10.2%	33	0.3%	12,899	2.0%	9,999	77.5%
20	Sanag	Erigavo	28,538	91.3%	2,181	7.0%	86	0.3%	31,262	4.8%	26,357	84.3%
21	Sanag	Badhan	0	–	0	–	0	–	0	–	–	–
22	Sanag	Dhahar	0	–	0	–	0	–	0	–	–	–
Grand Total			407,908	63.9%	225,519	35.3%	4,699	0.7%	647,863	100.0%	182,389	28.6%
Source: Somaliland National Electoral Commission

=== Parliamentary elections ===
Official results of the election took about a week to be announced. The NEC released provisional results of five electoral districts – Garadag, Hudun, Lughaya, Salahlay and Zeila – on 2 June. In those districts, Kulmiye received 24 seats, Waddani received 15, and UCID received 10. The NEC warned government officials and political parties against speculating on election results while counting was still underway.

On 6 June, the NEC published the final results, announcing that Waddani had received 31 seats, Kulmiye had received 30 seats, and UCID had received 21 seats. In a joint statement, Waddani and UCID announced they would form a governing coalition. Waddani and UCID also won a majority of seats together in the municipal elections. Of the 13 female candidates, none were elected to a parliamentary seat.

Party	Votes	%	Seats	+/–
Waddani	259,144	37.23	31	New
Kulmiye Peace, Unity, and Development Party	257,020	36.92	30	+2
Justice and Welfare Party	179,937	25.85	21	0
Total	696,101	100.00	82	0
Registered voters/turnout	1,065,847	–		
Source: EC, SEMO

=== By region ===
Region	UCID			Kulmiye			Waddani			Total seats
Region	Votes	%	Seats	Votes	%	Seats	Votes	%	Seats	Total seats
Awdal	345,130	21.2	3	37,215	41.3	5	33,708	37.4	5	13
Marodi Jeh	64,255	24.4	5	100,334	38.0	8	99,150	37.6	8	20
Sahil	20,412	31.1	3	26,501	40.4	4	18,705	28.5	3	10
Sanaag	21,903	29.2	4	24,670	32.9	4	28,517	38.0	5	12
Sool	16,946	26.9	3	26,842	42.6	5	19,292	30.6	4	12
Togdheer	36,907	26.9	4	40,962	29.9	4	59,286	43.2	6	15
Total	179,553	25.8	22	256,524	36.9	30	258,658	37.2	31	82
Source: Somaliland Election Monitoring Office

== Current Cabinet ==
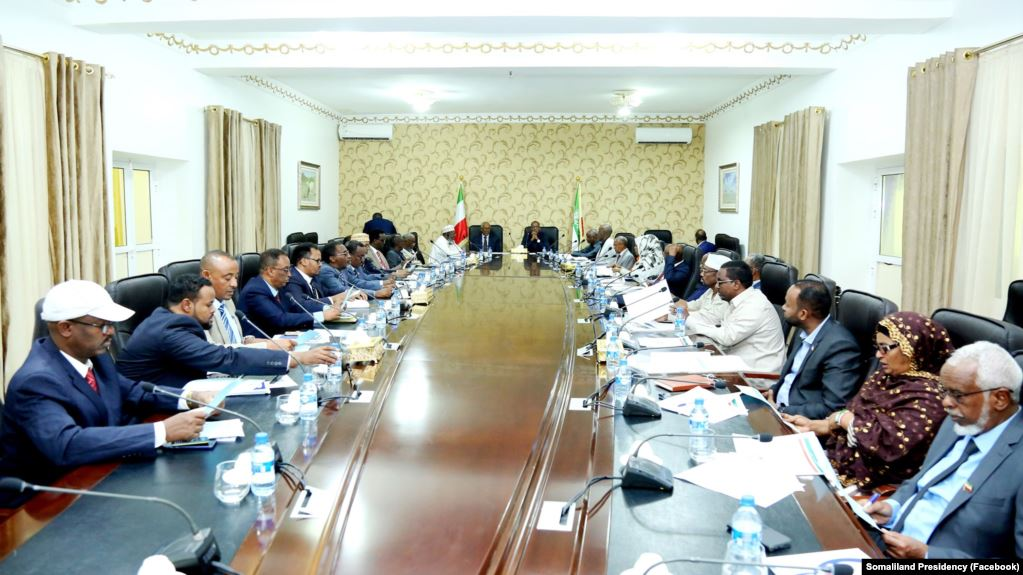
A meeting of the Muse Bihi cabinet (2020)

The Council of Ministers run the day-to-day operations of the country. The cabinet is nominated by the president and the president has the authority to nominate, reshuffle and also dismiss the ministers. Ministers are approved by the House of Representatives which is the lower house of the Parliament. The cabinet is composed of ministers, deputy ministers and also state ministers. The number of ministers in Somaliland changes from time to time as the cabinet is reshuffled. As of 17 May 2026, the cabinet consists of:

No	Office	Minister	Since
1	Ministry of Information and Communication Technology	Abdisalaan Hussein Awale	April 2026
2	Ministry of Civil Aviation and Airport Development	Fuad Ahmed Nuh	December 2024
3	Ministry of Youth and Sports	Ahmed-yasin Mohamed Farah (Coofle)	December 2024
4	Ministry of Water Development	Mohamed Abdimalik	April 2026
5	Ministry of Transportation and Roads Development	Osman Ibrahim Noor (Afgaab)	December 2024
6	Ministry of Public Works and Housing	Hussein Ahmed Aideed	March 2025
7	Ministry of Planning and National Development	Marwo Kaltun Sheikh Xasan	August 2025
8	Ministry of Livestock and Rural development	Omar Shuayb Mohamed	December 2024
9	Ministry of Justice	Yonis Ahmed Yonis Muhammed	December 2024
10	Ministry of Resettlement and Humanitarian Affairs	Saliban Duale Haji Jama	December 2024
11	Ministry of Investment and Industrial Development	Saeed (Said) Mohamed Bourale (Araale)	December 2024
12	Ministry of Interior	Abdalle Mohamed Arab	December 2024
13	Ministry of Health Development	Dr. Xuseen Bashir Wahan	April 2025
14	Ministry of Foreign Affairs and International Cooperation	Abdirahman Dahir Adaml	December 2024
15	Ministry of Environment and Climate Change	Cabdullahi Cisman Geeljire	December 2024
16	Ministry of Endowment and Religious Affairs	Sheikh Abdillahi Dahir Jama (Bashe)	December 2024
17	Ministry of Energy & Minerals	Ahmed Jama Barre Rooble	December 2024
18	Ministry of Labour, Social Affairs and Family	Milgo Mohamed Elmi (Sambalooshe)	December 2024
19	Ministry of Education and Science	Ismail Yusuf Duale Guuleed	December 2024
20	Ministry of Defence	Mohamed Yusuf Ali Ahmed (Ilkacase)	December 2024
21	Ministry of Trade and Tourism	Abdirahman Hassan Nur Furre	December 2024
22	Ministry of Parliamentary Relations and Constitutional Affairs	Ahmed Aw-dahir Haji Hassan	December 2024
23	Ministry of Agricultural Development	Adan Geddi Qayaad	April 2026
24	Ministry of Information, Culture and National Guidance	Barkhad Jama Hirsi Batuun	April 2026
25	Ministry of Finance Development	Abdilahi Hassan Aadam	December 2024
26	Ministry of Local Governments and Urban Development	Hassan Ahmed Duale	December 2024
27	Ministry of Fishery and Marine Resources	Ali Jama Farah (Buureed)	December 2024

== See also ==
- Electoral calendar
- Electoral system
