= Mohamed Muse Diriye =

Somali politician

Mohamed Muse Diriye محمد موسى ديري
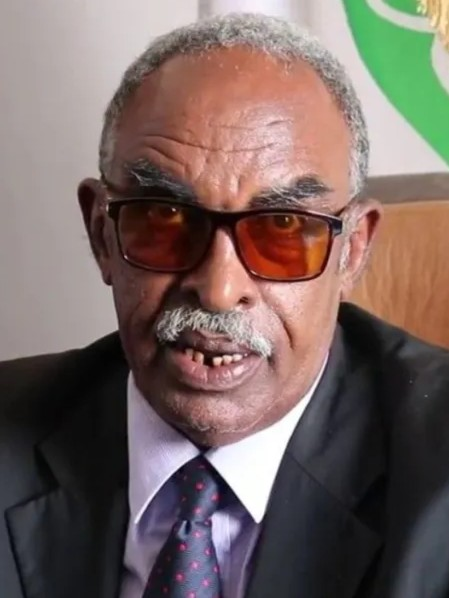

Minister of Water Resources
- In office 1 December 2019 – September 2021
- President: Muse Bihi Abdi
- Preceded by: Suleiman Yusuf Ali
- Succeeded by: Ali Hassan Mohamed

Minister of Information and National Guidance
- In office 31 March 2019 – 1 December 2019
- President: Muse Bihi Abdi
- Preceded by: Abdirahman Abdillahi Farah
- Succeeded by: Suleiman Yusuf Ali

Deputy Minister of Interior
- In office October 2015 – 31 March 2019
- President: Ahmed Mohamed Mohamoud (Silanyo); Muse Bihi Abdi

Governor of Togdheer
- In office 30 January 2014 – October 2015
- President: Ahmed Mohamed Mohamoud (Silanyo)
- Preceded by: Ahmed Abdillahi Omar
- Succeeded by: Mohamed Ibrahim Qabo

Personal details
- Born: Hargeisa, British Somaliland
- Party: Peace, Unity, and Development Party

Mohamed Muse Diriye (Somali: Maxamed Muuse Diiriye) is a Somali politician and the former Minister of Water Resources of Somaliland. He has previously served as the Minister of Information of Somaliland, State Minister and Deputy Minister of Ministry of Interior of Somaliland. He also served as the Governor of Togdheer region of Somaliland.

== Biography ==
Mohamed Muse Diriye is from the Sa'ad Musa sub-clan of the Habar Awal branch of the Isaaq clan-family.

Mohamed Muse Diriye served as director of the national television under the administration of Dahir Riyale Kahin.

In November 2004, the Speaker of Somaliland's House of Representatives appointed an ad hoc committee to investigate alleged bribery within the House, and Mohamed Muse Diriye was selected as one of the five committee members.

On 4 February 2006, clan fighting broke out in Ahmed Dhagah District on the outskirts of Hargeisa between the Arap sub-clan and the Eidagale, killing at least six people and injuring more than 30. The two sides used heavy machine guns and overwhelmed police sent to restore order; six shops were burned and properties were looted before the army was eventually deployed. Following this, a group of members of the Somaliland House of Representatives issued a resolution calling on the government to prevent citizens from resorting to violent unrest and to conduct a thorough investigation into the incident. Mohamed Muse Diriye was one of the 15 signatories to this resolution.

In March 2008, the Somaliland Journalists Association (SOLJA) held its third conference, and Mohamed Muse Diriye was elected as one of the 15 members of the association's executive committee.

=== Governor of Togdheer ===
In January 2014, President Silanyo appointed Mohamed Muse Diriye as Governor of Togdheer, replacing Ahmed Omar Abdillahi.

In September 2015, it was reported that Mohamed Muse Diriye was in a dispute with the library director over the closure of the Gandhi Library in Togdheer.

=== Interior Deputy Minister ===
In October 2015, President Silanyo announced a cabinet reshuffle, and Mohamed Muse Diriye was appointed Deputy Minister for Security in the Ministry of Interior. It was also said that, as a result, the Ministry of Interior came to be dominated by figures perceived as having aligned themselves with the former Kahin administration, beginning with Interior Minister Ali Mohamed Warancadde.

In June 2016, Mohamed Muse Diriye commented on Ali Khalif Galaydh, who supported Somalia as the president of Khatumo State, stating, “If he truly had any beneficial power, he would have remained in Buuhoodle; in reality he holds no significant influence, keeps moving from place to place, and is merely intoxicated by politics. I would advise Ali Khalif to withdraw from politics.”

In February 2017, Somaliland security forces arrested journalist Abdimalik Muse Coldoon at Hargeisa Airport immediately after his return, after he had traveled to Mogadishu and reportedly met Somalia's newly elected president Mohamed Abdullahi "Farmaajo". Mohamed Muse Diriye said the arrest was because Abdimalik Muse Coldoon had traveled to Somalia to support Somali politicians and then attempted to return without providing an explanation to the Somaliland government.

In September 2017, reports claimed that a rebellion had erupted in Las Anod, but Mohamed Muse Diriye denied this, explaining that there had been complaints from khat traders about the transit of khat to Puntland and related tax issues, however, this was not something that could be called a rebellion, and the government was always ready to engage in dialogue over grievances and complaints.

In November 2017, a meeting was held between the Somaliland National Electoral Commission and government officials regarding the 2017 Somaliland presidential election. The Electoral Commission explained that traffic restrictions would be imposed in major cities, and Mohamed Muse Diriye stated that citizens should vote calmly and act as pioneers of peace.

In December 2017, after being elected president, Muse Bihi Abdi reappointed Mohamed Muse Diriye as Deputy Minister of Interior.

In February 2019, following a series of terrorist attacks in Mogadishu, the UK Foreign and Commonwealth Office advised against all travel to Somalia (including Somaliland), allowing only Hargeisa and Berbera but recommending travel there be limited to essential trips, and urging British nationals to leave non-essential stays. In response, Mohamed Muse Diriye said the UK government should not treat Somaliland as the same as Somalia.

=== Information Minister ===
In March 2019, President Muse Bihi Abdi carried out a cabinet reshuffle, dismissing Abdirahman Abdillahi Farah Diriye (Guri Barwaaqo) as Minister of Information, National Guidance and Culture, and appointing Mohamed Muse Diriye to replace him.

=== Water Development Minister ===
In December 2019, President Muse Bihi Abdi carried out a cabinet reshuffle: Mohamed Muse Diriye was appointed Minister of Water Development, and former Water Development Minister Sulayman Yusuf Ali Koore was appointed Minister of Information, National Guidance and Culture.

In January 2020, the Youth Secretary of the opposition Waddani party criticized Minister of Water Resources Development Mohamed Muse Diriye for appointing his son to a senior position in an office linked to the Ministry of Water Resources Development.

In November 2020, Mohamed Muse Diriye held talks with a Djiboutian minister and signed an agreement on five wells near the border, under which three wells would remain with Somaliland and two wells would be handed over to Djibouti. The same two-out-of-five transfer had reportedly been proposed by Djibouti in 2012, but the Somaliland government at the time rejected it.

In July 2021, Mohamed Muse Diriye suspended the Director General of the Ministry of Water Resources Development over alleged misconduct, including suspected corruption and negligence of duty; however, the same reporting also alleged that Mohamed Muse Diriye himself faced corruption accusations.

In September 2021, President Muse Bihi Abdi announced a cabinet reshuffle, dismissing Mohamed Muse Diriye as Minister of Water Resources Development and appointing Ali Hassan Mohamed to replace him.

== See also ==
- Ministry of Information and National Guidance (Somaliland)
- Ministry of Water Resources (Somaliland)
- Ministry of Interior (Somaliland)
- List of Somalis
