= Abib Diriye Nour =

MUJ Abib Diriye Nour
- Abiib Diiriye Nuur Wacays
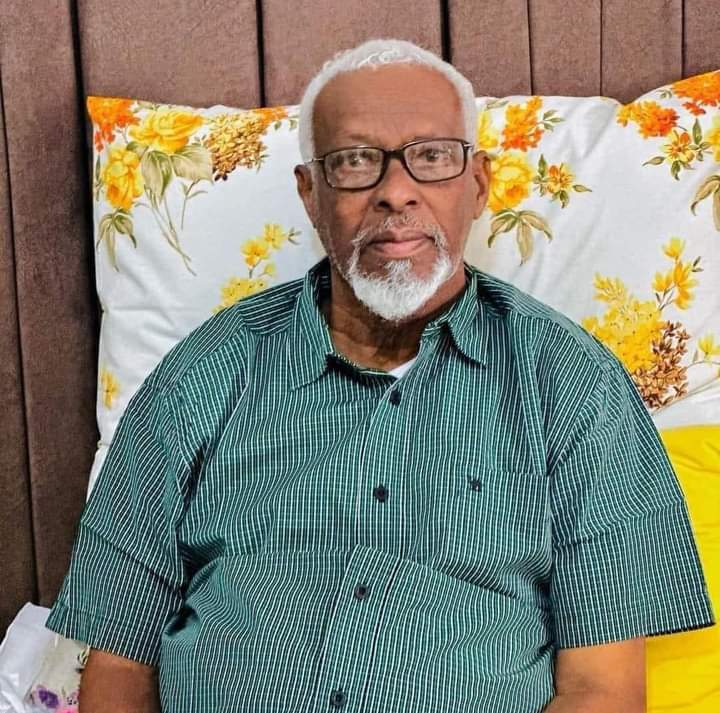

Minister of Health and Labour
- In office 1991–?
- President: Abdirahman Ahmed Ali Tuur

Minister of Agriculture
- In office ?–?
- President: ?

Minister of Aviation and Air Transport
- In office 3 July 2003 – July 2005
- President: Dahir Riyale Kahin

Minister of Information
- In office 1 September 2012 – 25 June 2013
- President: Ahmed Mohamed Mohamoud

Minister of Industry
- In office 25 June 2013 – 3 March 2015
- President: Ahmed Mohamed Mohamoud

Personal details
- Born: Gabiley District, Somaliland
- Died: April 2024 Germany
- Party: Waddani Party (from 2017); Kulmiye (former); United Peoples' Democratic Party (former)
- Occupation: Politician
- Nickname: Tima-cad

Military service
- Allegiance: Somali National Movement

Abib Diriye Nour (Somali: Abiib Diiriye Nuur Wacays), also known as Tima-cad, was a Somaliland politician, former cabinet minister, and a veteran of the Somali National Movement (SNM). He served in multiple ministerial portfolios from the early years of Somaliland's restored independence and later became a senior political figure in both the Kulmiye and Waddani parties. He was from Gabiley District and belonged to the Sa'ad Musa clan.

== Biography ==
Abib Diriye Nour was from Gabiley District. He belonged to the Sa'ad Musa clan.

Abib Diriye Nour was a mujahideen of the Somali National Movement (SNM).

=== Health minister ===
After the 18 May 1991 declaration of independence of Somaliland, Abib Diriye Nour was appointed minister of health and labour in Somaliland's first cabinet.

=== Agriculture minister ===
He later served as minister of agriculture.

=== Aviation minister ===
On 3 July 2003, after Dahir Riyale Kahin became president, Abib Diriye Nour was appointed minister of aviation and air transport.

In July 2005, Abib Diriye Nour defected from the ruling United Peoples' Democratic Party to the opposition Kulmiye Party, and he resigned as minister of aviation.; his resignation was preceded by a wave of withdrawals of support for the ruling party by members of parliament, sub-clans, and individuals, including former strong supporters of UDUB.

=== President's political adviser ===
On 26 August 2010, following the formation of his new administration by Kulmiye Party, President Silanyo announced a slate of appointments and named Abib Diriye Nour as the presidential adviser on political affairs.

In December 2011, after three people were killed in the Seemaal area between the Gabiley and Baki districts, Somaliland security forces arrested traditional leaders, clerics, and other members of the Gabiley community—all of whom were from the Gabiley community—and also detained the president's political adviser Abib Diriye Nour.

In April 2012, Abib Diriye Nour was named as one of the candidates for the chairmanship of the ruling Kulmiye Party. But this time, Muse Bihi Abdi was re-elected as chairperson.

In June 2012, Abib Diriye Nour accompanied the vice president on official visits to Djibouti, Ethiopia, and Sweden.

In July 2012, Abib Diriye Nour attended a large conference of the northern and western Gabiley clans as a government representative and emphasized the meeting's peaceful nature and the government's support for it.

=== Information minister ===
On 1 September 2012, Abib Diriye Nour was appointed minister of information, replacing Boobe Yusuf Duale, who had been dismissed the previous week; Abib's position as presidential press officer was taken over by Daud Khaire Kahin. Boobe's dismissal was widely attributed to internal infighting within the Ministry of Information, which followed the imprisonment of a finance director on corruption-related charges and Boobe's subsequent dismissal of two senior officials. In early September 2012, the editor-in-chief of the state-owned print media, who had been dismissed by the former minister, was reinstated by Abib Diriye Nour, bringing an end to the uncertainty that had surrounded the management of the national print media.

In February 2013, Abib Diriye Nour strongly criticized calls by some influential figures for a “national consultative conference,” arguing that such a meeting was in effect a clan-based gathering that posed a danger to the state, and stated unequivocally that the government would never accept it.

=== Industry minister ===
On 25 June 2013, President Silanyo dismissed the minister of industry, Abdirizak Ali Osman, and appointed Abib Diriye Nour to the post; the minister of information was replaced by the former deputy minister, Abdillahi Mohamed Dahir (“Cukuse”).

In March 2014, Abib Diriye Nour visited Gabiley District with the minister of finance and inspected local tax collection centers in the region.

In May 2014, a 43-member Kulmiye Party executive committee was announced, and Abib Diriye Nour was listed as the 22nd member of the committee.

In November 2014, Abib Diriye Nour spoke at the Kulmiye Party's executive committee and defended the government against recent opposition criticism, arguing that President Silanyo had delivered achievements such as strengthening the armed forces, expanding primary education, and building roads, and that a recent incident in which some people in Gabiley burned the Kulmiye flag did not reflect the will of the people of Gabiley.

On 3 March 2015, Abib Diriye Nour resigned from the cabinet, citing the country's unstable situation as the reason for his resignation. He became the second minister to resign under the Silanyo administration, following the finance minister Abdiaziz Mohamed Samale. This marks the fourth resignation of a senior government official, including the director-general of the Ministry of Foreign Affairs and the political advisor. His resignation is said to be related to the defeat of his close friend, the former finance minister, in the party's presidential primary. Or it is said to be a move preceding his dismissal in the cabinet reshuffle to be carried out in the near future. At the time, the resignations of Abib Diriye Nour and Abdiaziz Mohamed Samale were discussed as potentially posing a threat to the ruling party and its government.

=== Post–cabinet activities ===
In May 2015, Abib Diriye Nour traveled to Nairobi, Kenya, together with Abdiaziz Mohamed Samale, where they met U.S. deputy special representative for Somalia and Somaliland ambassador Brian H. Phipps, who had recently visited Hargeisa. In September 2015, Abib Diriye Nour and Samale returned to Somaliland.

In July 2016, Abib Diriye Nour traveled to India for medical treatment.

=== Waddani Party ===
In July 2017, Abib Diriye Nour announced that he was switching his party affiliation from the ruling Kulmiye Party to the opposition Waddani Party.

In August 2017, Waddani chairman Abdirahman Mohamed Abdullahi (“Cirro”) formed task forces to accelerate the party's election and campaign work, appointing Abib Diriye Nour as chair of the Committee for Mobilization and Regional Relations.

In March 2021, Abib Diriye Nour delivered a speech in his hometown of Gabiley at the announcement of candidates for the House of Representatives elections, stating that the community had been formed since the 1960s, had produced many prominent figures, and should not boast about or flaunt its collective voice.

=== Death ===
In April 2024, Abib Diriye Nour died in Germany; his body was repatriated to Somaliland on 13 April, where he was given a state funeral attended by Somaliland president Muse Bihi Abdi.
