= HWA =

HWA or hwa may refer to:

- Hwa, a type of traditional Korean boots
- HWA (group), an American female rap group
- HWA Team, a motor racing team
- Hargeisa Water Agency
- Heartland Wrestling Association
- Hemlock woolly adelgid
- Hillwood Airways, American-based charter airline with ICAO airline designator HWA
- Horror Writers Association
- Wané language's ISO 639-3 code
