= Mohamed Hussein Jama =

Current Somaliland Member of Parliament

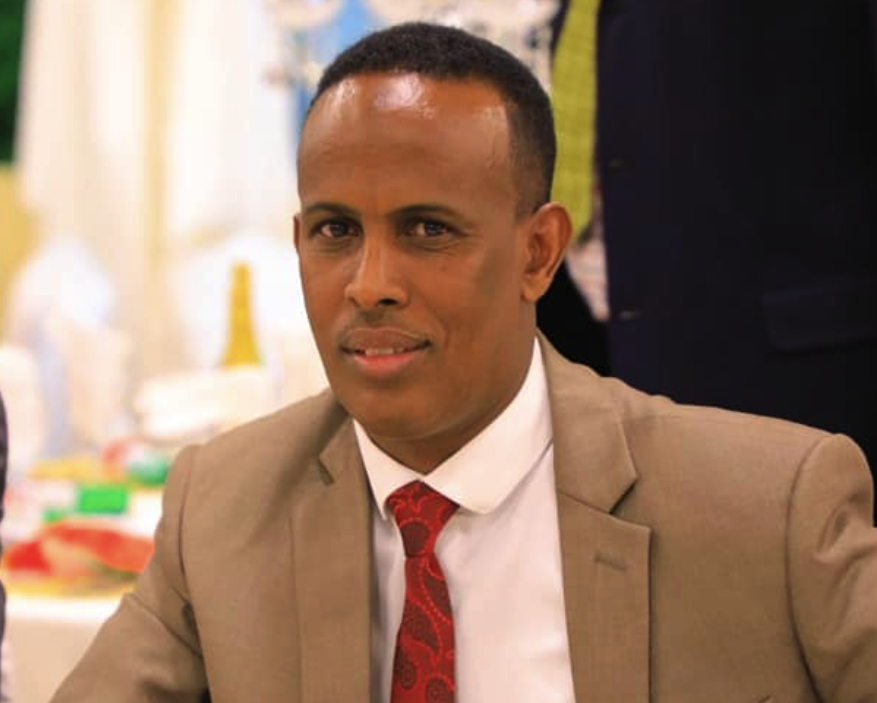

Member of Somaliland House of Representatives
- Incumbent
- Assumed office 2021

Personal details
- Born: Hargeisa, British Somaliland
- Citizenship: Somalilander
- Party: Peace, Unity, and Development Party

Mohamed Hussein Jama aka "Rambo" is a current Somaliland Member of Parliament. Jama is also founder and former editor of the Geeska Afrika newspaper.

== Career ==
Jama was elected in the 2021 Somaliland parliamentary election and represents the Maroodi Jeex constituency representing the Kulmiye party. Prior to his election, Jama worked as a journalist at Jamhuuriyadda and later founded the Geeska Afrika newspaper. He also served as chairman of the Center for Policy Analysis think tank based in Somaliland.
