= Geeska Afrika =

Somali newspaper

Wargeyska Geeska Afrika
- Type: Daily newspaper
- Format: Broadsheet
- Editor-in-chief: Mohamed Hussein Jama
- Founded: 2006
- Headquarters: Hargeisa, Somaliland
- City: Hargeisa
- Country: Somaliland
- Website: geeska.net

Geeska Afrika (Somali for 'The Horn of Africa') is a Somali-language Somalilander newspaper owned by Geeska Media Group, It was founded in 2006 and is published in Hargeisa, the capital of Somaliland. In April 2017, it became the second newspaper in Somaliland to publish its papers in color, after Dawan, following twelve years of black and white.

== See also ==
- List of newspapers in Somaliland
- Media of Somaliland
