= Ministry of Information and National Guidance =

Government ministry of Somaliland

Republic of Somaliland Ministry of Information, Culture and National Guidance
- Wasaaradda Warfaafinta, Dhaqanka iyo Wacyigelinta (MoICNG)
- Coat of arms of Somaliland

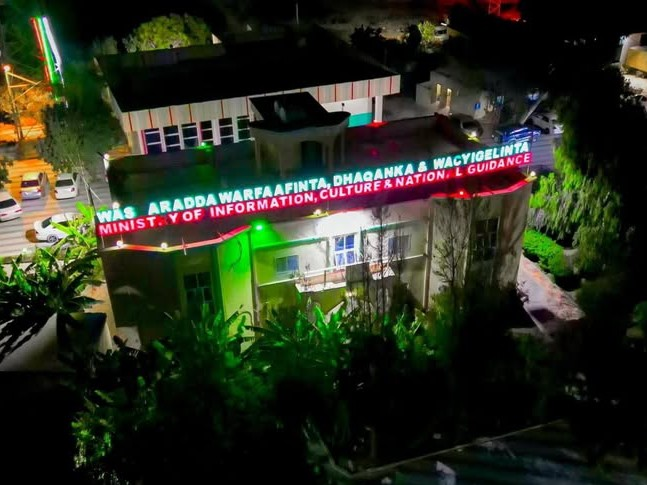

Agency overview
- Formed: 1992
- Jurisdiction: Somaliland
- Headquarters: Hargeisa, Maroodi Jeh (Somaliland)
- Agency executive: Muse Askar Guled, Minister (acting)
- Website: moin.govsomaliland.org

Footnotes
- Ministry of Information and National Guidance on Facebook Ministry of Information and National Guidance on X

The Ministry of Information, Culture and National Guidance of the Republic of Somaliland (MoICNG, Somali: Wasaaradda Warfaafinta, Dhaqanka iyo Wacyigelinta ee Jamhuuriyadda Somaliland) is a Somaliland government ministry which is responsible and concerned about Information, broadcasting, and national guidance. The current minister is Muse Askar Guled (acting).

== Overview ==
Dawan newspaper, Somaliland National TV, Radio Hargeisa and the Somaliland News Agency are government operated news broadcasting agencies under the Ministry of Information.

== Ministry name ==
=== Ministry of Information and National Guidance ===
The Somaliland Ministry of Information has existed since Somaliland declared its independence again in 1991.

The name of this ministry was originally “Ministry of Information and Awareness (Somali: Wasaaradda Warfaafinta iyo Wacyigelinta.)” However, as of 2026, the Somaliland government translates somali Wacyigelinta as “National Guidance,” so it could also be said that it was the “Ministry of Information and National Guidance.”

=== Ministry of Information, Culture and National Guidance ===
In June 2013, Somaliland President Silanyo appointed Abdillahi Mohamed Dahir as Minister of Information, Culture and National Guidance (Somali: Wasiirka Wasaaradda Warfaafinta, Dhaqanka iyo Wacyigelinta.)

== Ministers of Information ==
Image	Minister	Somali name	Term start	Term end
	Osman Adan Dool	Cismaan Aadan Dool	1991	1992
	Yusuf Sheikh Ibrahim	Yuusuf Sheekh Ibraahim	1993	1997
	Omar Maygag Samatar Furre	Cumar Maygaag Samatar Furre	1997	
	Hassan Mawlid Ahmed	Xasan Mowliid Axmed		May 1999
	Muse Hagi Mohamoud	Muuse Xaaji Maxamuud Guuleed (Inji)	May 1999	
	Ali Mohamed Warancadde	Cali Maxamed Warancadde	(from at least 16 June 2000)	(by at least 26 April 2001)
	Abdillahi Mohamed Duale	C/laahi Maxamed Ducaale	(from at least 24 August 2001) 4 July 2003 (continue serving)	6 August 2006
	Ahmed Haji Dahir Ilmi	Axmed Xaaji Daahir Cilmi	6 August 2006	
	Abdillahi Jama Osman	Cabdilaahi Jaamac Cismaan	28 July 2010	
	Ahmed Abdi Mohamed (Habsade)	Axmed Cabdi Xaabsade	15 January 2011	14 March 2012
	Boobe Yusuf Duale	Boobe Yuusuf Ducaale	14 March 2012	31 August 2012
	Abib Diriye Nour	Abiib Diiriye Nuur Wacays (timacad)	1 September 2012	4 July 2013
	Abdillahi Mohamed Dahir (Cukuse)	Cabdillaahi Maxamed Daahir (Cukuse)	4 July 2013	15 February 2016
	Osman Sahardid Addanni	Cismaan Cabdillaahi Saxardiid	15 February 2016	
	Abdirahman Abdullahi Farah (Guri-Barwaqo)	Cabdiraxmaan Cabdilaahi Guri Barwaaqo	14 December 2017	31 March 2019
	Mohamed Muse Diriye		31 March 2019	1 December 2019
	Suleiman Yusuf Ali	Saleebaan Yuusuf Cali Koore	1 December 2019	14 November 2023
	Ali Hassan Mohamed	Cali Xasan Maxamed (Mareexaan)	14 November 2023	
	Ahmed Yasin Sheikh Ali	Axmed-yaasiin Sheekh Cali Ayaanle	14 December 2024	7 Decembar 2025
	Muse Askar Guled (acting)	Muuse Askar Guuleed	7 Decembar 2025	
	Barkhad Jama Hirsi Batuun	April 2026	Present	

== See also ==
- Cabinet of Somaliland
- Media of Somaliland
- Politics of Somaliland
