= Hussein Mohamed Mohamoud =

Somali politician

Hussein Mohamed Mohamoud حسين محمد محمود

Minister of Health
- In office 27 July 2010 – 25 June 2013
- President: Ahmed Mohamed Mohamoud
- Preceded by: Osman Kassim Kodah
- Succeeded by: Suleiman Haglotosiye

Hussein Mohamed Mohamoud (Somali: Xuseen Maxamed Maxamuud), also known as Hussein Hog, is a Somali politician. He is the former Minister of Health of Somaliland, from July 2010 to June 2013.

== See also ==
- Politics of Somaliland
- Ministry of Health (Somaliland)
- Cabinet of Somaliland

Political offices
Preceded by Osman Kassim Kodah	Minister of Health; 2010-2013	Succeeded by Suleiman Haglotosiye
