= Hassan Ismail Yusuf =

Somali politician

Hassan Ismail Yusuf حسن اسماعيل يوسف
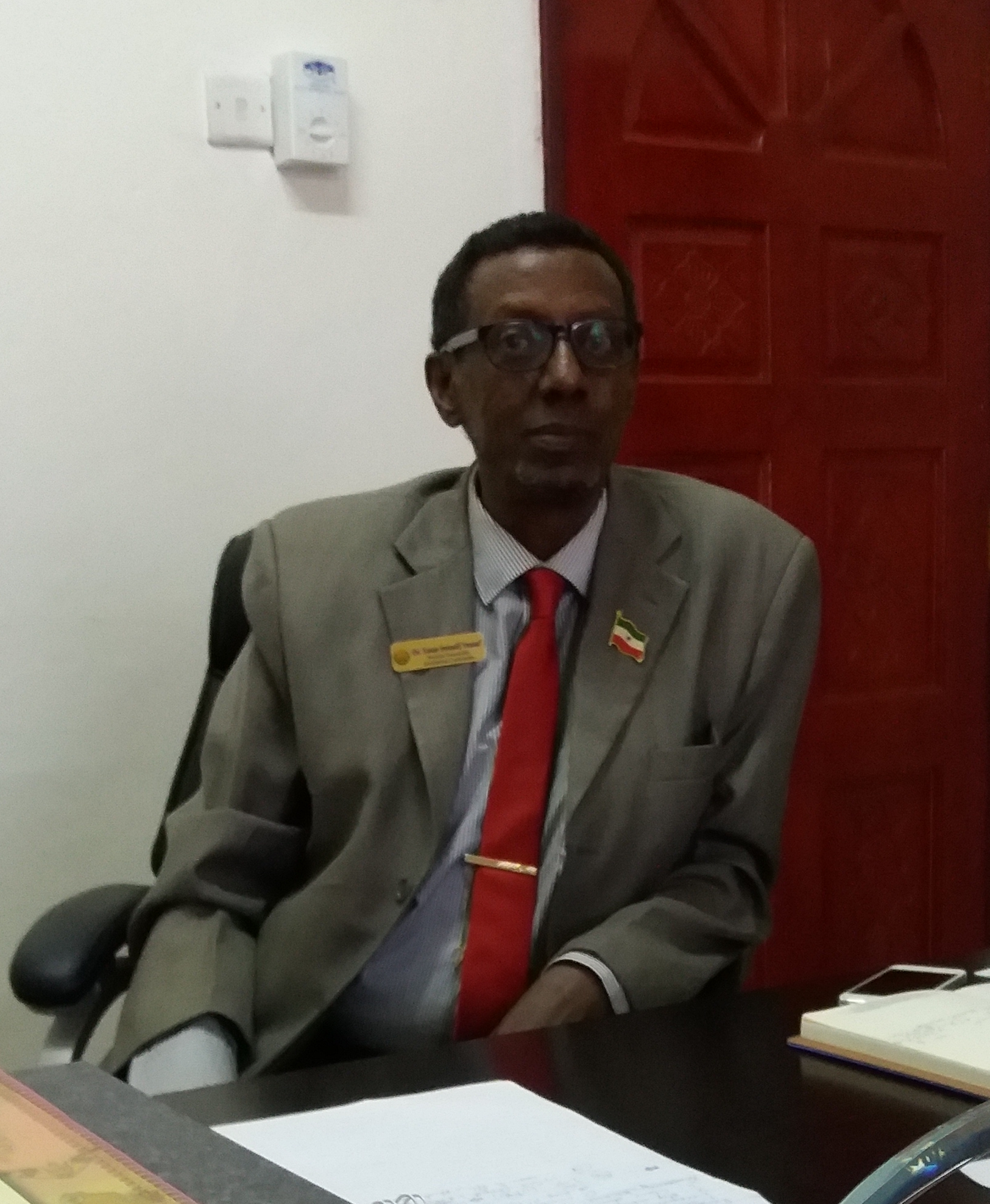

Minister of Health
- In office 14 December 2017 – 14 April 2019
- President: Ahmed Mohamed Mohamoud
- Preceded by: Suleiman Haglotosiye
- Succeeded by: Omar Ali Abdillahi

Personal details
- Born: 01.01.1954 Burao, Somali Republic (now Somaliland)
- Education: Somali National University, Liverpool School of Tropical Medicine

Hassan Ismail Yusuf (Somali: Xasan Ismaaciil Yuusuf) is a Somaliland politician, He served as Minister of Health and Labor of Somaliland in 2002 and as Minister of Health of Somaliland, from December 2017 to April 2019.

== Personal life ==
Hassan was born in the outskirts of Burao in 1954 where he also completed his primary education. He finished his secondary school at Sheikh before moving on to Mogadishu to study at the Somali National University where he graduated from the School of Medicine and Surgery in 1979.

In 1984, Hassan earned a Master‘s Degree in Community Health from the Liverpool School of Tropical Medicine.

== Career ==
In 1986, Hassan joined the London branch of the Somali National Movement, where he served as chairperson of the executive committee. At the end of the Somali Civil War, the Burao conference was held in April–May 1991, during which the SNM declared an independent Republic of Somaliland in the region that constituted the British Somaliland protectorate before independence.

Hassan became the Health Director of Burao General Hospital in 2000 and later served as Minister of Health and Labour of Somaliland in 2002.

Afterwards, he worked six years for the Italian NGO Comitato Collaborazione Medica as tuberculosis medical supervisor.

In 2012, he became dean of the College of Medicine and Health Sciences of the University of Hargeisa and then, in 2013, of the newly established Faculty of Medicine and Health Sciences of Burao University. Dr. Hassan is particularly concerned with all matters of community health and its improvement.

== See also ==
- Ministry of Health (Somaliland)
- Cabinet of Somaliland

Political offices
| Preceded by Suleiman Haglotosiye | Minister of Health; 2017-2019 | Succeeded by Omar Ali Abdillahi |
