= Ministry of Water Resources (Somaliland) =

Government ministry of Somaliland

Republic of Somaliland Ministry of Water Resources
- Wasaarada Khayraadka Biyaha; MoWR
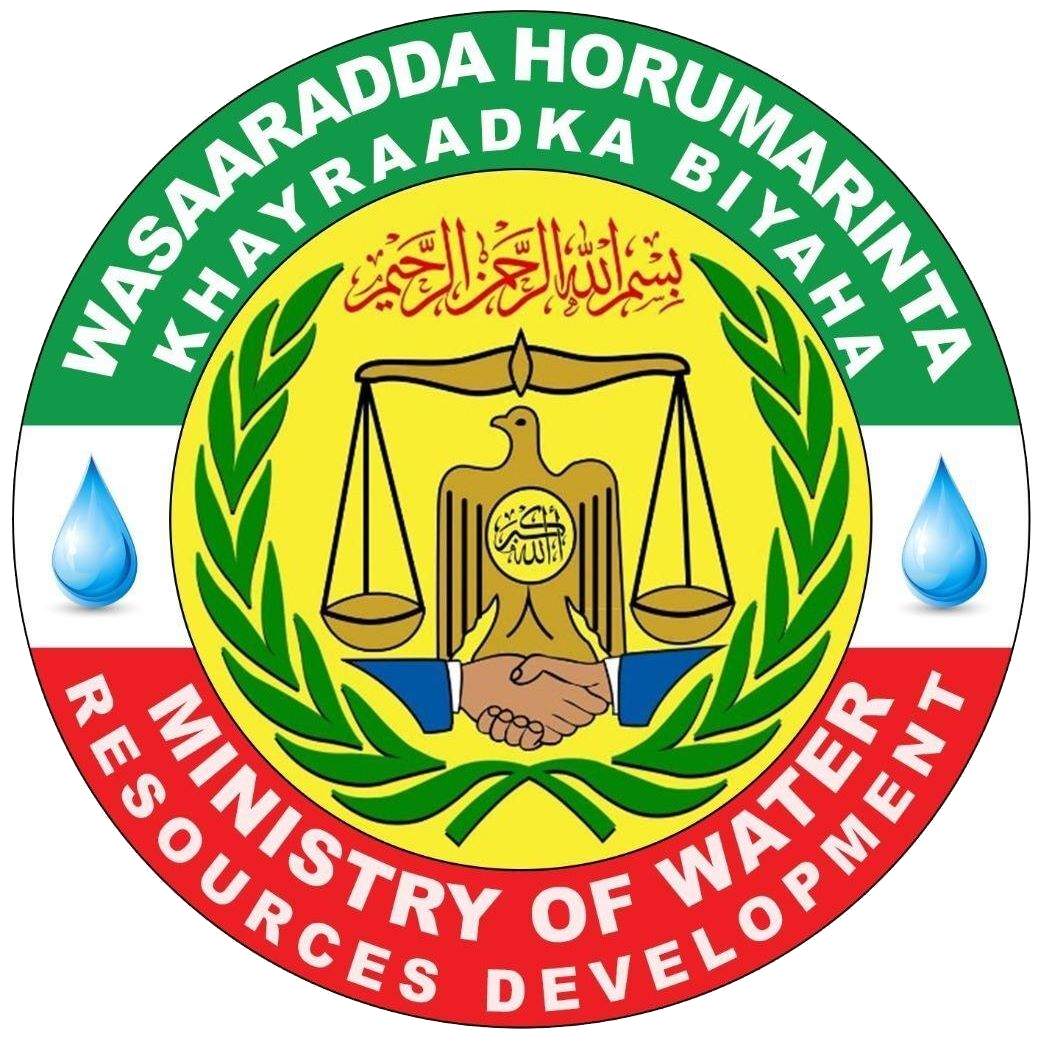

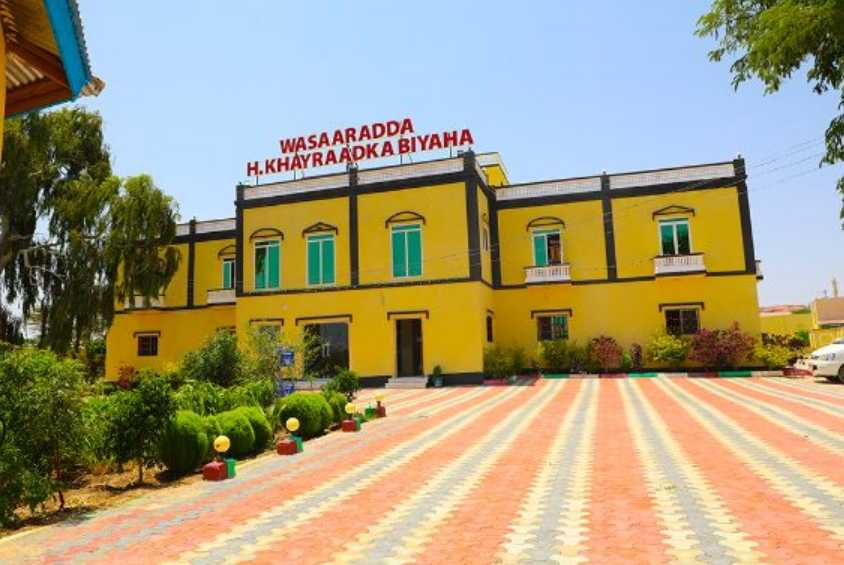
- Ministry of Water Resources of the Republic of Somaliland Building

Ministry overview
- Formed: 2013; 13 years ago
- Jurisdiction: Somaliland
- Headquarters: Hargeisa, Maroodi Jeh (Somaliland)
- Minister responsible: Minister
- Website: https://mowd.govsomaliland.org/

Footnotes
- Ministry of Water Resources on Facebook

The Ministry of Water Resources of the Republic of Somaliland (MoWR) (Somali: Wasaarada Khayraadka Biyaha Somaliland) (Arabic: وزارة الموارد المائية) is a ministry of the Somaliland cabinet in charge of the development and regulation of Somaliland's water resources.

== History ==
In 1991, when Somaliland reclaimed its independence, the government body responsible for water resources was part of the Ministry of Mining and Water (Wasaaradda Macdanta iyo Biyaha).

In March 2011, the National Water Act (Xeerka Biyaha Qaranka, Law No. 49/2010) was enacted in Somaliland. Under this legislation, the Ministry of Water Resources (Wasaaradda Khayraadka Biyaha) was designated as the primary government body responsible for the management, protection, and allocation of the nation's water resources. It is also referred to by this name in the December 2017 Presidential Decree.

In October 2014, Minister of Water launched a major water exploration project in Las Anod, Sool region, to address severe water shortages. The initiative, part of a broader development plan for eastern regions, involved collaboration between the government and local stakeholders. This project aimed to secure sustainable clean water for the community.

In December 2018, under the Somaliland Waste Management and Urban Sanitation Act (Law No. 83/2018) enacted, the Ministry of Water Resources Development (Wasaaradda Horumarinta Khayraadka Biyaha) was identified as one of the key ministries responsible for waste management and public sanitation. Its primary mandates involve protecting water resources in collaboration with local governments, preventing the pollution of water resources, and being involved in waste treatment, landfilling, and incineration.

In February 2019, Minister of Water Resources addressed Somaliland's pressing water needs, prioritizing the 90% complete Hargeisa water expansion project. He highlighted regional progress, including a major sweet water well in Erigavo and plans for Las Anod’s first clean water system.

In January 2021, Minister of Water Resources Development emphasized the ministry's role in national progress during the 2021 Performance Book launch. He noted that advancements in basic infrastructure and the modernization of government service delivery systems are key indicators of growth.

In July 2025, the Somaliland government, through the Ministry of Water Resources Development, improved national water services. Projects included drilling wells in Burao and Erigavo, restoring dormant sources, and constructing dams in Garadag and El Afweyn. These efforts, including a major Berbera expansion, support a five-year plan to permanently end emergency water trucking and ensure long-term drought resilience.

== Ministers of Water ==
Minister's Image	Minister's English Name Somali Name	Ministry's English Name Somali Name	Appointment Date	Resignation Date
	Qasim Sheikh Yusuf Ibrahim; Qaasim Shiikh Yuusuf Ibraahim	Ministry of Mining and Water Resources; Wasaaradda Macdanta iyo Biyaha	May 2003	November 2009
	Muse Abdi Ismael (Mushmed); Muuse Cabdi Ismaaciil (Mushmed)	Ministry of Mining and Water Resources; Wasaaradda Macdanta iyo Biyaha	January 2010	March 2010
	Farhan Jama Ismail; Farxaan Jaamac Ismaaciil	Ministry of Mining and Water Resources; Wasaaradda Macdanta iyo Biyaha	March 2010	
	Hussein Ali Duale; Xuseen Cabdi Ducaale	Ministry of Mining, Energy and Water; Wasaaradda Macdanta, Biyaha iyo Tamarta	July 2010	
	Hussein Mohamed Abdille; Xuseen Maxamed Cabdille	Ministry of Water Resources; Wasaaradda Khayraadka Biyaha	June 2013	February 2015
	Bashe Ali Jama; Baashe Cali Jaamac	Ministry of Water Resources; Wasaaradda Khayraadka Biyaha	February 2015	December 2016
	Hussein Abdi Boos; Xuseen Cabdi Boos	Ministry of Water Development; Wasaaradda Horumarinta Biyaha	December 2016	
	Sulayman Yusuf Ali Koore; Saleebaan Yuusuf Cali Koore	Ministry of Water Resources; Wasaaradda Horumarinta Biyaha	December 2017	
	Mohamed Muse Diriye; Maxamed Muuse Diiriye Wacays	Ministry of Water Resources Development; Wasaaradda Horumarinta Biyaha	December 2019	September 2021
	Ali Hassan Mohamed; Cali Xasan Maxamed	Ministry of Water Resources Development; Wasaaradda Horumarinta Khayraadka Biyaha	September 2021	
	Abubakar Abdirahman Good Waceys; Abubakar Cabdiraxmaan Good Wacays	Ministry of Water Resources Development; Wasaaradda Horumarinta Khayraadka Biyaha	December 2024	
	Mohamed Abdimalik	Ministry of Water Resources Development	April 2026	Present

== See also ==
- Somaliland National Armed Forces
- Politics of Somaliland
- Hargeisa Water Agency
