= Omar Ali Abdillahi =

Somali politician

Omar Ali Abdillahi عمر علي عبد الله
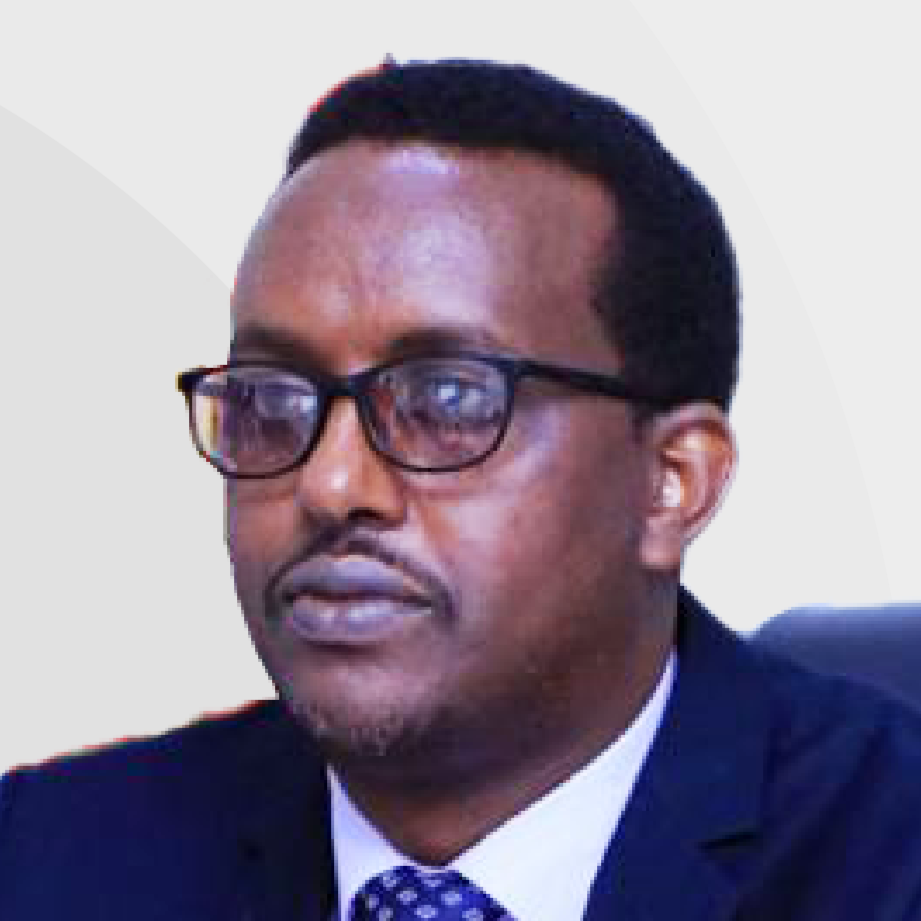

Minister of Health
- Incumbent
- Assumed office 14 April 2019
- President: Muse Bihi Abdi
- Preceded by: Hassan Ismail Yusuf

Personal details
- Party: Peace, Unity, and Development Party

Omar Ali Abdillahi (Somali: Cumar Cali Cabdillaahi) is a Somali politician. He was appointed as the Minister of Health of Somaliland on 14 April 2019.

== See also ==
- Peace, Unity, and Development Party
- Ministry of Health (Somaliland)
- List of Somalis

Political offices
Preceded by Hassan Ismail Yusuf	Minister of Health; 2019–present	Incumbent
