= Ministry of Health (Somaliland) =

Government ministry of Somaliland

Republic of Somaliland Ministry of Health Development
- Wasaaradda Horumarinta Caafimaadka Jamhuuriyadda Somaliland
- Coat of arms of Somaliland

Ministry overview
- Formed: 1991; 35 years ago
- Jurisdiction: Somaliland
- Headquarters: Hargeisa, Maroodi Jeh, Somaliland
- Minister responsible: Hussein Bashir Herzi, Minister
- Ministry executives: [Vice Minister Zamzam Mohamed Salah; Head Director Dr.Ahmed Zaki Mohamoud Jama
- Website: somalilandmohd.com

The Ministry of Health Development of the Republic of Somaliland (MoHD, Somali: Wasaaradda Horumarinta Caafimaadka Somaliland) (Arabic: وزارة الصحة) is a ministry of government of Somaliland that is responsible for health system, it's also responsible for proposing and executing government policy of health.

== Overview ==
The Ministry of Health has existed since Somaliland regained its independence in 1991. By 1995 at the latest, it was known as the Ministry of Health and Labour (MOHL, Somali: Wasaaradda Caafimaadka iyo Shaqada). In July 2010, the Ministry of Labor became independent, and it was renamed the Ministry of Health (MOH, Somali: Wasaaradda Caafimaadka.) In 2018, it became the Ministry of Health Development (MoHD, Somali: Wasaaradda Horumarinta Caafimaadka).

== History ==
As of July 1992, it was reported that Somaliland had failed to establish an administration, including a health system, as a result of frequent cabinet reshuffles, internal factional infighting, and the lack of international recognition.

In 1999, the Parliament of Somaliland passed a law for the establishment of the National Health Professionals Commission (NHPC).

In June 2000, a consultation meeting was held in Hargeisa, bringing together representatives from the Ministry of Health, international NGOs, and regional health committees to discuss the implementation of regional health plans.

In 2011, UNICEF and the World Health Organization, in partnership with the Ministry of Health, reached over 325,000 children under the age of five and 250,000 women of child-bearing age in Somaliland through the Child Health Days (CHDs) campaign. This large-scale health initiative was designed to provide a high-impact package of services, including vaccinations against measles and polio, Vitamin A supplementation, deworming tablets, and nutritional screening to combat the effects of severe drought and high malnutrition rates among internally displaced persons and vulnerable communities.

In 2013, the Ministry of Health, in collaboration with the International Organization for Migration and other partners, established mobile health clinics to serve internally displaced persons (IDP) camps and vulnerable host communities in Somaliland. These mobile units were deployed to provide essential primary healthcare services—including routine medical consultations, safe motherhood programs, communicable disease control, and nutritional support—to populations residing in temporary settlements such as the Mohamed Mooge camp in Hargeisa. By delivering medical care directly to these communities, the initiative significantly reduced the geographical and financial barriers faced by displaced families who previously lacked access to permanent health facilities.

In May 2017, Médecins Sans Frontières (MSF) officially resumed its medical operations in Somaliland and Somalia, ending a four-year absence that began with its complete withdrawal in 2013 due to severe security threats. The decision to return was driven by overwhelming healthcare needs exacerbated by a severe regional drought, widespread malnutrition, and outbreaks of infectious diseases. In coordination with the Ministry of Health Development, MSF gradually established support for regional hospitals and medical facilities in Somaliland, including cities such as Hargeisa, Burao, Borama, Berbera, and Las Anod, with a primary focus on emergency care, pediatrics, and the treatment of tuberculosis.

In 2019, the Somaliland Ministry of Health Development and the Central Statistics Department, with support from the United Nations Population Fund (UNFPA), concluded data collection for the first nationwide Somaliland Health and Demographic Survey (SLHDS). Published in 2020, this comprehensive study was the first of its kind in the region to provide a nationally representative baseline of vital health indicators across urban, rural, and nomadic populations. The survey gathered critical data on fertility rates, maternal and child mortality, chronic diseases, birth spacing, and gender-based violence, establishing an essential evidence base for policymakers and international organizations to shape future public health strategies and humanitarian responses.

In 2021, the Ministry of Health Development, in collaboration with UNFPA, conducted a large-scale follow-up study on the status of female genital mutilation (FGM) in Somaliland. The study report recorded testimonies from local community members indicating a significant increase in FGM procedures performed on girls—particularly the Pharaonic type—during school closures and lockdowns caused by the COVID-19 pandemic. One of the primary factors reported was that the extended school closures led parents and families to perceive there was sufficient time for the girls to recover from the procedure.

Between 2020 and 2021, the World Health Organization (WHO) conducted an international medical study known as a cluster randomized trial in Somalia, Kenya, and Guinea. A July 2024 report scientifically demonstrated that clinics where health workers received training in person-centred communication (PCC) successfully achieved a significant reduction in the intention of mothers to have their daughters undergo FGM, compared to clinics without such training. As part of this research, the Somaliland Ministry of Health Development collaborated with the WHO to implement a project aimed at empowering frontline health workers to become "agents of change" towards the eradication of FGM.

In March 2021, the ministry successfully coordinated the arrival of the first shipment of Oxford–AstraZeneca COVID-19 vaccines provided through the international COVAX initiative. Following the delivery, the ministry launched a nationwide vaccination rollout that initially prioritized the immunization of frontline healthcare workers, the elderly, and individuals with underlying health conditions, aiming to curb the transmission of the virus and prevent the local healthcare infrastructure from being overwhelmed.

In March 2025, the medication supply for over 2,000 HIV/AIDS patients in Somaliland was jeopardized due to the impact of United States humanitarian aid cuts. The Minister of Health coordinated with international organizations, including the World Health Organization (WHO), to secure alternative supply chains.

In April 2025, within the first 100 days of the new administration, the Ministry of Health Development completed several infrastructure projects, including the construction of a general hospital in Da'ar buduq and the installation of an intensive care unit (ICU) at Gabiley General Hospital.

In May 2025, in response to a measles outbreak in several regions of Somaliland, the Minister of Health Development reported to the cabinet and launched an emergency large-scale vaccination campaign targeting children under the age of five.

== Departments ==
- Admin & Finance Department
- Human Resource Department
- Policy, Planning & Strategic Information Department
- Public Health Department
- Community Health Services Department
- Health Services & Hospitals Department
- Regional Secretariat

== Ministers of Health ==
Image	Minister	Term start	Term end
	Abib Diriye Nour (Timacad)	1991	1992
	Yasin Haji Mohamoud	1993	1997
	Abdi Aw Dahir Mohammed	March 1997	October 2001
	Hassan Ismail Yusuf	October 2001	
	Osman Kassim Kodah	July 2003	June 2006
	Abdilahi Husein Iman Darawal	June 2006	June 2007
	Abdi Haybe Mohamed		March 2010
	Ahmed Hassan Ali (Asowe)	March 2010	July 2010
	Hussein Mohamed Mohamoud (Hog)	July 2010	June 2013
	Suleiman Haglotosiye	June 2013	December 2017
	Hassan Ismail Yusuf	December 2017	April 2019
	Omar Ali Abdillahi	April 2019	September 2021
	Hassan Mohammed Ali (Gaafaadhi)	September 2021	January 2025
	Hussein Basher Herzi	January 2025	Incumbent
