= Boobe Yusuf Duale =

Somalian politician and writer (born 1948)

Abdirahman Yusuf Duale
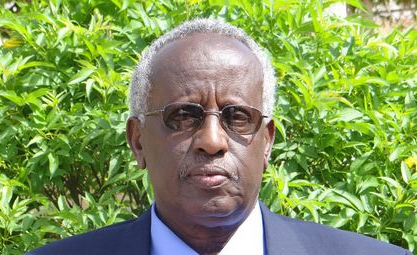

Minister of Information
- In office March 2012 – August 2012
- President: Ahmed Mohamed Mohamud (Silanyo)

Personal details
- Born: December 7, 1948 (age 77) Hargeisa, British Somaliland
- Died: November 13, 2026 Hargeisa, Republic of Somaliland
- Nickname(s): Bobby, Boobe in Somali

Abdirahman Yusuf Duale (Somali: Cabdiraxmaan Yuusuf Ducaale), commonly known as Boobe Yusuf Duale (Somali: Boobe Yuusuf Ducaale), was a writer and former Somali National Movement (SNM) fighter. In 2012, he served as Minister of Information in Somaliland for a few months. He was also friends with the poet Hadrawi.

== Biography ==
=== Early life and education ===
Boobe was born on December 7, 1948, in Hargeisa. He began his early education at a madrasa (Quranic school) in 1955 under Macallin Xabashi (Sheikh Ahmed Nur) in Hargeisa. Between 1956 and 1957, he attended the madrasa of Sheikh Mohamed Sheikh Ibrahim Barawe.

For his formal education, he entered the Reece Primary School in 1957, later transferring to the Biyo-Dhacay Primary School, from which he graduated in 1959. In 1960, he enrolled in the Sykes Thompson (later Ahmed Gurey) Intermediate School.

In 1964, he moved to Mogadishu to attend the Benadir Secondary School, a boarding school established and taught by teachers from the Soviet Union. He graduated from secondary school in 1968. That same year, he moved to Italy for university studies. He initially studied the Italian language at the University for Foreigners in Perugia. He then relocated to the University of Ferrara, where he studied geology until 1972. Later, he pursued political science courses in Moscow, Soviet Union.

On the other hand, Boobe's writing career began in 1971 with the publication of four books on the poet Timacade.

=== Early career ===
After returning from his studies, Boobe worked in the Public Relations Office of the Supreme Revolutionary Council's Training Section from 1973 to 1974. Subsequently, he became the representative of the General Trade union for the Fish Factory in Las Qorey.

In July 1976, he joined the founding of the Somali Revolutionary Socialist Party (SRSP). Following the party's formation, he worked in the Ideology Leadership at the SRSP headquarters. He was also the editor of the Somali-language section of Halgan, the official SRSP newspaper, and served on the BANFAS committee responsible for preparing participation in the 1977 FESTAC arts festival in Nigeria. Until 1981, he was a regular contributor to Radio Mogadishu programs and the daily Xiddigta Oktoobar newspaper.

In January 1981, Boobe was appointed to the Central Committee of the Western Somali Liberation Front (WSLF), an anti-Ethiopia pro-Somalia government groups, and was named the governor of the Ethiopia Xarshin region.

=== Anti-government activities ===
In mid-1981, due to his opposition to the military regime of Siad Barre, he left the WSLF. He arrived in Aden, Yemen, where he joined the Somali Working People's Party (SWPP).

In early 1987, Boobe, a chronicler for the Somali National Movement (SNM) in Dire Dawa at the time, documented military operations by interviewing veteran fighters and provided these historical records to SNM Chairman at the time Ahmed Mohamed Silanyo.

In February 1990, while his family resided in a town Dhuuryo after fleeing Hargeisa, Boobe's son was born. Boobe intended to name him Bashir in honor of the Somali National Movement fighter Mohamed Ibrahim Hirsi (Bashir). However, his mother, Hajia Ibado Haji Abokor, insisted on naming the child Ayaanle, and that's exactly what happened.

=== After the establishment of Somaliland ===
In 1999, Boobe became a researcher at the Academy for Peace and Development (APD) in Somaliland.

In April 2008, at a Hargeisa media conference, Boobe critiqued the declining standards of local press conferences. He urged journalists to demand written statements and maintain professional distance from politicians, arguing that the media must exercise stricter editorial control to shield the public from inflammatory and meaningless political rhetoric.

In 2009, after Mohamed Ali Samatar was sued in the United States for his involvement in massacres in Somaliland, Boobe stated that responsibility for the atrocities was not limited to Samatar alone but involved all officers of the former revolutionary government.

In December 2009, when rapper K'naan visited Hargeisa, he met with Boobe.

=== Information Minister ===
In March 2012, Boobe was appointed as the Minister of Information by President Silanyo.

In July 2012, Boobe participated in a Mobile Library Club event in Burao to promote literacy and national heritage.

In August 2012, President Silanyo dismissed Boobe from his position as Minister of Information. Silanyo described the move as part of a routine government rotation, but media outlets reported it followed a dispute between the minister and ministry officials after Boobe had dismissed the heads of the national television station and government newspapers.

=== Waddani Party ===
In December 2015, Boobe, the Information Secretary for the Waddani party at the time, criticized a biography Rejadii Rumowday detailing the achievements of President Ahmed Mohamed Silanyo. He remarked that history would eventually document both the positive and negative aspects of Silanyo's legacy, while questioning the administration's management of infrastructure projects and public funds.

In February 2016, President Ahmed Mohamed Silanyo appointed Boobe to an 18-member committee tasked with seeking international recognition for Somaliland and advising on talks with Somalia. Boobe, then the Information Secretary for the Waddani party, accepted the role despite noting that he had not been consulted prior to the public announcement.

In March 2016, Boobe resigned from his position as the Secretary of Information for the Waddani party and relinquished his membership. He criticized the organization for having "empty centers, empty offices, empty respect, and empty roles." Boobe stated that political solutions should involve changing the parties that form governments rather than just changing the government itself. The party chairman, Abdirahman Mohamed Abdullahi, described the resignation as a normal occurrence and noted that individuals are free to join or leave.

In July 2016, Boobe traveled to Bangalore, India, to seek treatment for kidney failure. After undergoing dialysis for over three months, he received a kidney transplant on October 26, 2016. The donor was his son, Yusuf Abdirahman. Following a successful recovery period in India, both Boobe and his son returned to Hargeisa on December 16, 2016, where they were welcomed by Somaliland officials, writers, and poets. During his medical journey, he received support from various government figures and private organizations from both Somaliland and Djibouti.

=== Death ===
Boobe died on 13 of November, 2026 in Hargeisa, Somaliland.

== Publications ==
- Ducaale, Cabdiraxmaan Yuusuf, ed. (1983). Diiwaanka Maansada: Cabdillaahi Suldaan Maxamed (Timacade) [The Collection of Poems of Abdillaahi Sultan Mohamed (Timacade)] (in Somali). Stockholm: Hal-beeg.
- Ducaale, Boobe Yuusuf (1996). The SNM Liberation Struggle (1981–1993). Hema Books. ISBN 978-1739744502.
- Ducaale, Boobe Yuusuf (2007). Waxaan u hibeynayaa dhallinyarada [I Dedicate it to the Youth] (in Somali). Flamingo Printing. p. 517.
- Ducaale, Boobe Yuusuf (2008). Deelleey: Saadaal Rumowday [Deelleey: A Fulfilled Prophecy] (in Somali). Flamingo Printing Press. p. 405. ISBN 978-0956117304.
- Ducaale, Boobe Yuusuf (2012). Ilmadii Hal-abuurka: Maqaallo iyo Maansooyin loogu Baroor-diiqay: Macallin Maxamed Xaashi Dhamac (Gaarriye), 1952kii–2012ka [The Tears of Creativity: Articles and Poems Mourning Teacher Mohamed Hashi Dhamac (Gaarriye), 1952–2012] (in Somali). Bobe Publications. p. 130. ISBN 978-0956117311.
- Ducaale, Boobe Yuusuf (2017). Ibraahin Meygaag Samatar: (1941kii-2011kii) [Ibrahim Meygaag Samatar: (1941–2011)] (in Somali). Hargeisa: Sagaljet Publications.
- Ducaale, Boobe Yuusuf (2016). Mujaahid Maxamed Ibraahin Xirsi (Bashiir): (1956kii–1987kii) [Mujahid Mohamed Ibrahim Hirsi (Bashir): (1956–1987)] (in Somali). Madbacadda Sagal Jet. p. 94. ISBN 978-9188133168.
