= Somaliland Post =

Somali news website

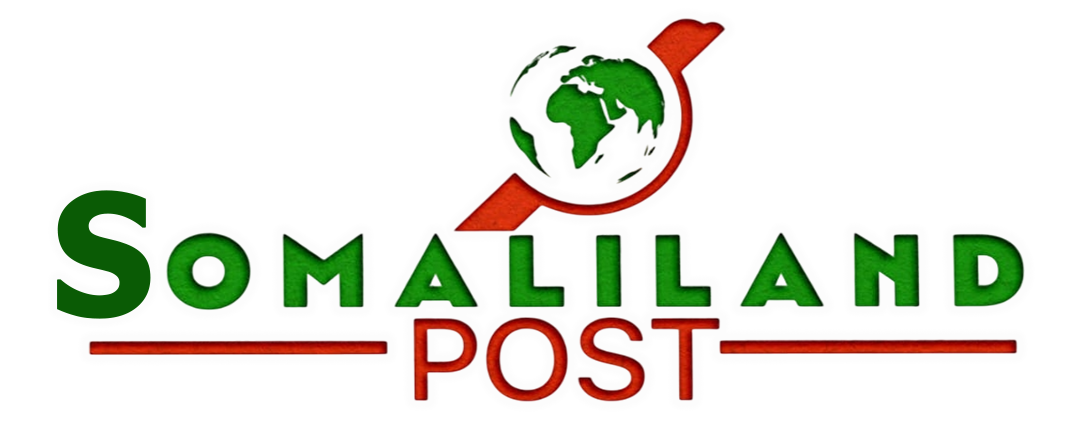
- Available in: English, Somali
- Founded: 2011
- Headquarters: Hargeisa, {{{location_country}}}
- Area served: Somaliland & Horn of Africa
- Founder: Kadar Kaariye
- Website: somalilandpost.news

Somaliland Post is an independent media platform headquartered in Hargeisa, reporting comprehensive news on regional security, politics, and socio-economic affairs across Somaliland and the broader Horn of Africa.

Founded in August 2011, the Somaliland Post news website offers Comprehensive News and analysis focusing on political, security, and diplomatic developments in the Horn of Africa, including Somaliland's diplomatic efforts and regional security concerns.

== Background ==
Founded primarily as a Somali-language news website covering domestic, regional, and international affairs, the platform later expanded its editorial reach by introducing an English-language news section to serve an international audience

Today, the platform is established as news source for Somaliland media both inside and outside the country for analysis and commentary.
