= Sulayman Yusuf Ali Koore =

Somali politician

Sulayman Yusuf Ali سليمان يوسف علي
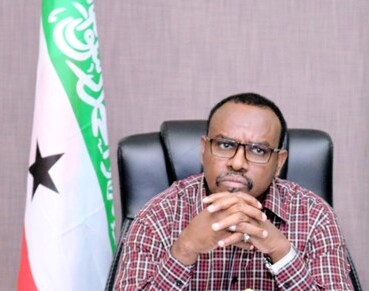

Minister of Information and National Guidance
- Incumbent
- Assumed office 1 December 2019
- President: Muse Bihi Abdi
- Preceded by: Mohamed Muse Diriye

Minister of Water Resources
- In office 14 December 2017 – 1 December 2019
- President: Muse Bihi Abdi
- Preceded by: Hussein Abdi Boos
- Succeeded by: Mohamed Muse Diriye

Personal details
- Born: 21 October 1965 (age 60) Las Anod, Somalia
- Citizenship: Somali
- Party: Peace, Unity, and Development Party (Before 2010); United Peoples' Democratic Party
- Education: Afgoye Institute of Agriculture; Military Academy

Sulayman Yusuf Ali (Koore) (Somali: Saleebaan Yuusuf Cali Koore) is a Somali politician and former military officer who is presently serving as Somaliland's Minister of Information and National Guidance.President Muse Bihi Abdi appointed Koore as Minister of Water Resources for Somaliland in 2017. Koore also served as Minister of Agriculture under President Egal's administration and also thirteen years as a member of parliament of Somaliland. He belongs to the Nuur Axmed subdivision of the Dhulbahante clan.

== See also ==
- Minister of Information and National Guidance
- Ministry of Water Resources (Somaliland)
- Parliament of Somaliland
- List of Somaliland politicians
- List of Somali politicians

Political offices
Preceded by Bashe Ali Jama	Minister of Water Resources; 2017–2019	Succeeded by Mohamed Muse Diriye
Preceded by Mohamed Muse Diriye	Minister of Information; 2019–present	Incumbent
