= Somaliland Journalists Association =

Somaliland Journalists Association (SOLJA)
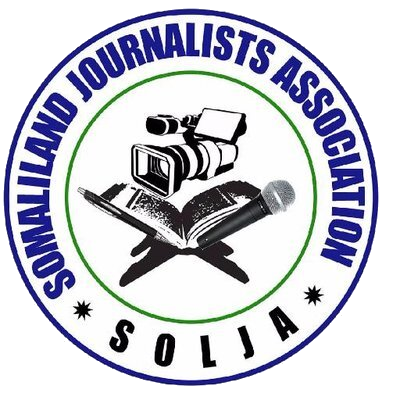
- Founded: June 2003
- Type: Media
- Location: Hargeisa
- Region served: Somaliland
- Key people: Mohamed Abdi Jama Xuuto (Chairman); Yahya Mohamed Abdi Xanas (General Secretary)
- Website: Official Website

The Somaliland Journalists Association (SOLJA; Somali: Ururka Suxufiyiinta Somaliland) is a media association for journalists in Somaliland, based in Hargeisa. SOLJA is a nonprofit organization made by journalists working in the media industry of Somaliland. The association promotes the role of a free media in Somaliland society, and protects the rights of journalists in Somaliland. It was founded in June 2003.

== See also ==
- Media of Somaliland
- Ministry of Information (Somaliland)
