= Suleiman Haglotosiye =

Somalian politician

Saleeban Essa Ahmed
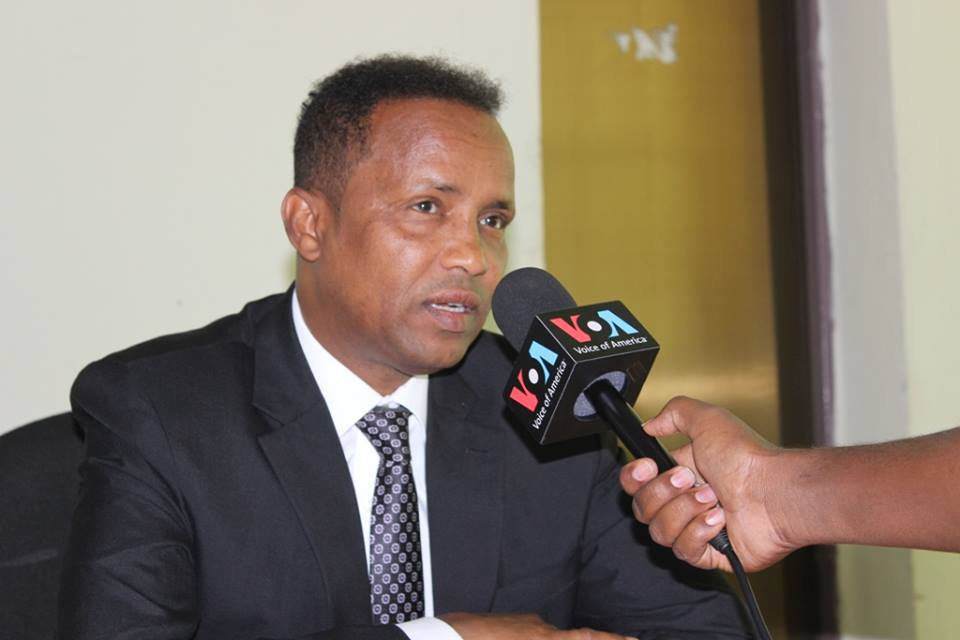

Minister of Health
- In office January 2013 – November 2017
- President: Ahmed Mohamed Mohamoud
- Preceded by: Dr Hussein Muhumed Mahamud
- Succeeded by: Hassan Ismail Yusuf

Hoggaanka Badbaadada iyo Mideynta SSC (HBM-SSC)
- In office 2010–2012
- Succeeded by: Ahmed Elmi Osman

Personal details
- Born: 1968 (age 57–58) Buuhoodle, Somali Republic (now ssc-Khatumo region of Somalia)
- Party: Peace, Unity, and Development Party
- Education: Somali National University

Saleban Essa Ahmed "Haglotosiye" (Somali: Saleeban Ciise Axmed “Xaglatoosiye”), is a prominent Somali politician who was the leader of the SSC Movement and served as Somaliland's Minister of Health.

Haglotosiye has had an elaborate career in Somali politics, in 2009 he run as presidential candidate in the Puntland elections. After he lost the election he created Hoggaanka Badbaadada iyo Mideynta SSC (HBM-SSC), which had a main purpose of liberating the Sool, Sanaag and Ayn regions from Somaliland. However, he joined Somaliland after an agreement in 2012. Since February 2023, he has been living in Garowe, Puntland.

== Biography ==
Haglotosiye was born in Hargeisa in 1968 and was brought up in Buuhoodle till he moved to Mogadishu to study at the Somali National University in 1980. He belongs to the Reer Hagar clan within the Ararsame sub-section under the Ahmed Gerad sub clan of Dhulbahante.

Haglotosiye ran in the 2009 Puntland presidential election but ultimately lost to Abdirahman Farole.

=== Dhulbahante militia leader ===
From 2010, Haglotosiye served as the leader of HBM-SSC, a warlords centered around Dhulbahante clan. SSC was founded as autonomous political movement distinct from both Somaliland and Puntland; although Puntland’s government initially played a crucial enabling role and SSC activists tried to align with Puntland, political unity with Puntland later became impossible due to clan-based differences and perceived lack of transparency and fairness, so SSC stood on its own two legs as an independent movement.

In August 2012, Haglotosiye signed a ceasefire agreement with Somaliland.

=== Resettlement Minister ===
On 14 October 2012, President Ahmed Mohamed Mohamoud "Silanyo" appointed Haglatoosiye as Somaliland's Minister of Resettlement and Aid replacing Abdirasak Ali Osman. Abdirasak Ali Osman has been appointed as the newly established Minister of Industry.

=== Minister of Health of Somaliland ===
In 2013, Haglotosiye was appointed as the Minister of Health.

In February 2014, Somaliland migrants living in Djibouti awarded Haglotosiye an honor certificate in recognition of his outstanding contributions to communities in Somaliland.

In March 2014, while traveling by car from Burco toward Hargeisa as part of President Silanyo's convoy, Information Minister Abdillahi Mohamed Dahir (Ukuse)'s vehicle collided with Haglotosiye's car, leaving Ukuse with a fracture in his right hand.

In November 2015, the ruling Kulmiye Party held a congress in which 365 delegates selected candidates for the 2017 presidential election; Haglotosiye ran as a vice-presidential candidate but lost by 116 votes to the incumbent vice president, Abdirahman Saylici.

On 1 February 2016, President Silanyo began a tour of eastern Somaliland; shortly beforehand, Somaliland’s Health Minister Haglotosiye was in Buuhoodle under tight escort, a situation seen as signaling the president’s possible imminent visit there.

In May 2017, after he asked a critical question of Minister of Health Haglotosiye at a press conference in Hargeisa, Horseed Media editor was detained and held in prison.

In October 2017, Haglotosiye attended a ceremony marking Dacarta’s elevation to district status in Maroodi Jeex, where he said he had postponed an overseas trip in order to be present for the important event.

In December 2017, the newly inaugurated president Muse Bihi Abdi announced a new cabinet that replaced most ministers; Hassan Ismail Yusuf was appointed Minister of Health, while Haglotosiye did not secure a position in the new government.

=== Former Minister of Health of Somaliland ===
In December 2017, two vehicles carrying Haglotosiye’s wife and her security escort were stopped while traveling from Hargeisa to Las Anod and were detained by police in Burao, where the vehicles were seized; the authorities did not announce any reason for the action. Haglotosiye said the vehicles had been sent to transport family members and to pick up elders from Las Anod, and the incident was reported against a background in which he may have been attempting to relocate his wife to Las Anod after failing to secure a position in the newly formed government.

In February 2021, Haglotosiye described COVID-19 as "a very dangerous disease" and urged the public to take strong precautions to prevent its spread; he also said he strongly hoped that the country would hold free and fair elections that everyone could accept.

In October 2021, Haglotosiye announced that he had left the Kulmiye Party.

=== Somaliland People’s Party ===
On 29 January 2022, Haglotosiye founded a new political party in Somaliland called the Somaliland People’s Party (SPP) and became its leader.

In July 2022, Haglotosiye visited Las Anod in eastern Somaliland but did not travel to Buuhoodle, which had previously been one of his political bases.

=== Retirement from Somaliland politics and relocation to Puntland ===
In February 2023, Haglotosiye called on the government to withdraw its troops from the Sool region about the Las Anod conflict. Later, Haglotosiye moved to Puntland's capital Garowe. He further announced around March 7 that he was withdrawing from Somaliland politics.
