= Working People's Party =

Working People's Party may refer to:

- Working People's Party of England, an English former political party
- Working People's Party (Moldova), a Moldovan political party
- Working People's Party (Puerto Rico), a former Puerto Rican political party
