= Hargeisa Water Agency =

Governmental agency in Somaliland

Republic of Somaliland Hargeisa Water Agency
- Somali: Wakaaladda Biyaha Hargeysa; Arabic: وكالة مياه هرجيسا

Department overview
- Formed: 15 April 1974
- Jurisdiction: Somaliland
- Headquarters: Hargeisa, Somaliland
- Employees: 629
- Annual budget: $6.2 Million
- Department executive: Abdilahi Mohamoud Beershiya, Manager
- Parent department: Ministry of Water
- Website: www.hargeisawateragency.org

Footnotes
- Hargeisa Water Agency on Facebook

Hargeisa Water Agency (Somali: Wakaaladda Biyaha Hargeisa) (Arabic: وكالة مياه هرجيسا) is the governmental agency responsible for water supply to the Somaliland capital city of Hargeisa.
It was formed in 1974, And the current manager of the agency is Abdilahi Mohamoud Beershiya

== See also ==
- Ministry of Water Resources (Somaliland)
- Hargeisa Airport
- Hargeisa Stadium
- Hargeisa Group Hospital
- University of Hargeisa
