= Dawan (newspaper) =

Somali newspaper

Wargeyska Dawan
- Type: Daily newspaper
- Format: Broadsheet
- Editor-in-chief: Mohamed Osman Mire
- Founded: 2000
- Headquarters: Hargeisa, Somaliland
- Website: wargeyskadawan.com

Dawan (Somali: Wargeyska Dawan) is a Somaliland Somali-language newspaper. It is published in Hargeisa, and it was started in 2000. The newspaper is owned by Dawan Media Group which a is department of Ministry of Information and National Guidance of Somaliland, It works as the principal newspaper of the government of Somaliland.

== See also ==
- List of newspapers in Somaliland
- Media of Somaliland
