= Media of Somaliland =

Somaliland is a democratic nation in the Horn of Africa. Somaliland has endorsed the freedom of expression and free press since it declared its independence from Somalia. According to Somaliland's constitution and Somaliland media laws, defamation and libel are not criminal offenses; aggrieved parties may seek redress in civil courts.

== History ==
The first Somali radio was Radio Kudu currently known Radio Hargeisa, and it still is the only radio that operates in Somaliland, Radio Hargeisa which was founded in 1942, in the name of Radio Kudu was a British colony when Somaliland took its independence from Britain on 26 June 1960, Radio Kudu was renamed to Radio Hargeisa and it became the state-owned media.

Somaliland unified Somalia to form "Somali Republic" after nine years later, Somali Republic was overthrown by the military in 1969. During the military regime, there were no media outlets and media laws all media was governmental except BBC Somali. that time was a dark time for the whole Somali media, especially that of Somaliland.

== Somaliland media status ==
Although there are many challenges facing Somaliland's media and journalists, Somaliland is considered one of the African countries with status according to freedom house reports in recent years. Somaliland Freedom is Party free while its neighbors including Somaliland, Yemen, and Djibouti are lower than Somaliland's status.

== Televisions in Somaliland ==
- Ardaa TV.
- Horn Cable Television.
- Somaliland National TV.
- SOMNEWS TV
- Eryal TV.
- Saab TV.
- Bulsho TV.
- Baddacas24 TV
- Kalsan TV
- True Cable TV
- Star TV.
- Rayo TV.
- Horyaal TV.
- Codka Bariga Afrika - CBA TV
- MM Somali TV
- Sahan TV

== News Websites in Somaliland ==
- Oodweynenews.com
- Somaliland Post.
- Berberanews.com
- Somalilandsun.com
- Somalilandchronicle.com
- Qarannews.com
- Gabiley.net
- Boramanews.com
- Arabsiyonews.com
- Somtribune.com
- Hargeisapress.com
- Hayaannews.net
- Araweelonews.com
- Aftahannews.com
- Hadhwanaagnews.com

== Newspapers and Magazines In Somaliland ==
| Name of the Newspaper | Type of the Newspaper | Headquarter |
|---|---|---|
| Dawan | state media | Hargeisa |
| Ogaal | independent | Hargeisa |
| Geeska Afrika | independent | Hargeisa |
| Jamhuuriya | independent | Hargeisa |
| Hubaal | independent | Hargeisa |
| Sahan | independent | Hargeisa |
| Foore | independent | Hargeisa |
| Warsugan | independent | Hargeisa |
| Yool | independent | Hargeisa |
| Saxansaxo | independent | Hargeisa |
| Xog Ogaal | independent | Hargeisa |
| Waaberi | independent | Hargeisa |
| Saxafi | independent | Hargeisa |
| Horn Tribune | state media | Hargeisa |
| Republican | independent | Hargeisa |
| Somaliland review Magazine | independent | Hargeisa, London |

== Media Organizations in Somaliland ==
Somaliland Journalists Association "SOLJA" is the most popular Non- Governmental organization that advocates Somaliland's media freedom and journalists but there are many other media organizations whose job is to promote the freedom of the press and journalists.

The below list contains the media organizations operating in Somaliland.

1. SOLJA- Somaliland Journalists Association.
2. WIJA - Women in Journalists Association.
3. FIMO - Female in Media Organization
4. SIBA - Somaliland Independent Broadcasters Association.
5. SOMA- Somaliland Online Media Association
