= Abdillahi Mohamed Dahir =

Somali politician

Abdillahi Mohamed Dahir عبد الله محمد ضاهر
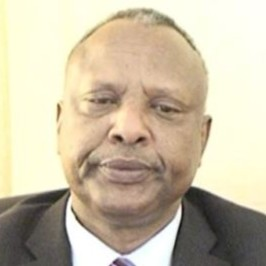

Minister of Livestock
- In office 16 February 2016 – 14 December 2019
- President: Ahmed Mohamed Mohamoud
- Preceded by: Omar Mohamed Farah
- Succeeded by: Office dissolved

Minister of Information and National Guidance
- In office 25 June 2013 – 16 February 2016
- President: Ahmed Mohamed Mohamoud
- Preceded by: Bobe Yusuf Duale
- Succeeded by: Mohamed Yusuf Ahmed

Abdillahi Mohamed Dahir (Somali: Cabdillaahi Maxamed Daahir), also known as Cukuse, is a Somali politician who served as the Minister of Livestock and Fisheries of Somaliland from February 2016 to December 2017. He formerly served as the Minister of Information and National Guidance of Somaliland from June 2013 to February 2016.

== See also ==
- Ministry of Information and National Guidance (Somaliland)
- Cabinet of Somaliland
- Ministry of Livestock & Fisheries (Somaliland)

Political offices
Preceded by Bobe Yusuf Duale	Minister of Information and National Guidance; 2013-2016	Succeeded by Osman Abdillahi Sahardid
Preceded by Omar Mohamed Farah	Minister of Livestock; 2016-2017	Succeeded by Office dissolved
