= Ali Hassan Mohamed =

Somali politician

Ali Hassan Mohamed Cali Xasan Maxamed
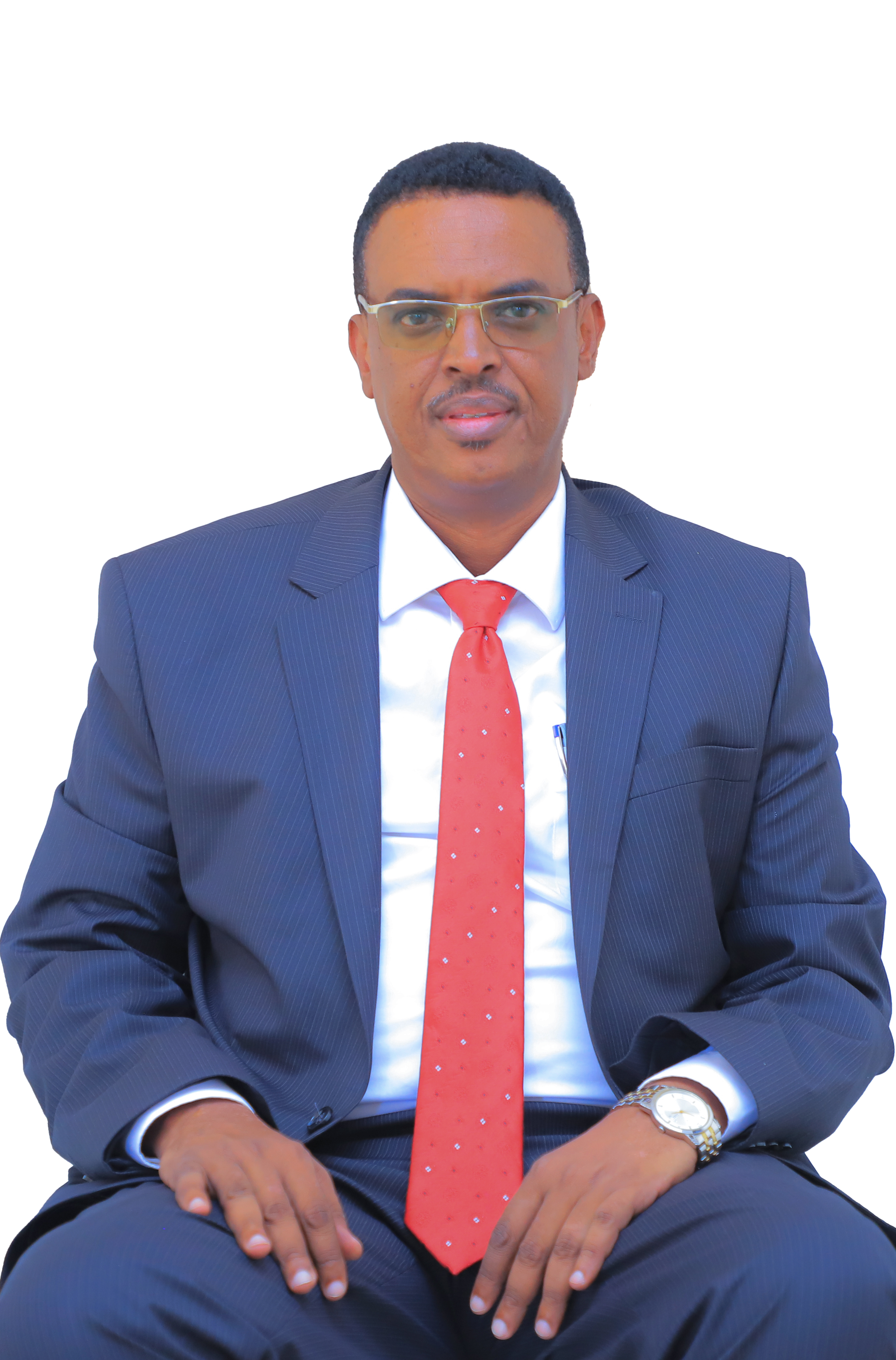
- Official portrait, 2023

Minister of Water Resources Development
- Incumbent
- Assumed office 2 September 2021

Minister of Public Work Housing Transportation and Roads
- In office 26 October 2015 – 19 December 2017

2nd Parliament of Somaliland
- In office 29 September 2005 – 19 October 2015

Personal details
- Party: Kulmiye

Ali Hassan Mohamed (Somali: Cali Xasan Maxamed) is a Somali politician who has served as the Minister of Water Resources Development for Somaliland since 2021. He was previously a Member of the Parliament of Somaliland from 2005 to 2015 and Minister of Public Work Housing Transportation and Roads from 2015 to 2017.

== Early life and education ==
Ali Hassan was born in Burao in 1971, where he attended primary and secondary school.

== Political career ==
Ali Hassan's political career began in early 2002, when he was one of the founders of Kulmiye political party. Throughout his career, he has held positions including Member of Parliament of Somaliland (2005–2015), Minister of Public Work Housing Transportation and Roads (2015–2017), and Minister of Water Resources Development (2021–present).
