= Elections in Somaliland =

Somaliland elects on a national level a head of state (the president) and a legislature. The president is elected by the people for a five-year term; there is an election extension that could also be added for two more years depending on national needs and approval. Somaliland held its first democratic election in 2003, after the president at that time died. There were also several other democratic elections in sequence. The second election was held on 26 June 2010, when the five-year term ended; there was an election extension, which was two more years. In 2017, there was a combination of presidential and parliamentary elections; the new president and parliament members were voted for at the same time.

The last democratic election was held in 2024, in which the current president of Somaliland was elected. In addition, There were only two parliamentary elections in Somaliland; the first parliamentary election was also held On September 25, 2005, in which 246 candidates participated from Six electoral Regions in Somaliland. The Parliament (Baarlamaanka) has two chambers. The House of Representatives ("Golaha Wakiillada") will have 82 members, elected for a five-year term. The House of Elders (Golaha Guurtida) will have 82 members, representing traditional leaders.The second parliament election was held 2017.

== Presidents and vice presidents of Somaliland (1991–2024) ==
Presidents	Vice Presidents	Years
Abdirahman Ahmed Ali	Hassan Isse Jama	1991-1993
Mohammed Hajji Ibraahin Egal	Abdirahman Aw Ali Faarah/Daahir Riyaale Kaahin	1993-2002
Daahir Riyaal Kaahin	Ahmed Yousuf Yaasin	2002-2010
Ahmed Mohamed Mohamoud Siilaanyo	Abdirahman Abdullahi Ismail Saylici	2010-2017
Muse Biihi Abdi	Abdirahman Abdullahi Ismail Saylici	2017-2024
Abdirahman Abdulahi Cirro	Mohamed Aw Ali Abdi	2024-Present

Somaliland has a multi-party system, with numerous parties in which no one party often has a chance of gaining power alone, and parties must work with each other to form coalition governments.

== Latest elections ==
=== Presidential elections ===
Candidate	Running mate	Party	Votes	%
Abdirahman Mohamed Abdullahi	Mohamed Aw-Ali Abdi	Waddani	407,908	63.92
Muse Bihi Abdi	Mohamoud Hassan Saajin	Peace, Unity, and Development Party	225,519	35.34
Faysal Ali Warabe	Abdirashid Duale Diriye	For Justice and Development	4,699	0.74
Total			638,126	100.00
Valid votes			638,126	98.45
Invalid/blank votes			10,037	1.55
Total votes			648,163	100.00
Registered voters/turnout			1,227,048	52.82
Source: HO, Registered

=== Parliamentary elections ===
Party	Votes	%	Seats	+/–
Waddani	259,144	37.23	31	New
Kulmiye Peace, Unity, and Development Party	257,020	36.92	30	+2
Justice and Welfare Party	179,937	25.85	21	0
Total	696,101	100.00	82	0
Registered voters/turnout	1,065,847	–		
Source: EC, SEMO

=== Municipal elections ===
Party	Votes	%	Seats	+/–
Kulmiye Peace, Unity, and Development Party	268,815	38.99	93	−6
Waddani	260,841	37.83	79	+11
Justice and Welfare Party	159,801	23.18	48	+8
Total	689,457	100.00	220	–
Registered voters/turnout	1,065,847	–		
Source: SLNEC

== Past elections ==
=== 2017 presidential election ===
Candidate	Running mate	Party	Votes	%
Muse Bihi Abdi	Abdirahman Saylici	Peace, Unity, and Development Party	305,909	55.10
Abdirahman Mohamed Abdullahi	Mohamed Aw-Ali Abdi	Waddani	226,092	40.73
Faysal Ali Warabe	Abdi Ahmed Musa Abyan	For Justice and Development	23,141	4.17
Total			555,142	100.00
Valid votes			555,142	98.15
Invalid/blank votes			10,475	1.85
Total votes			565,617	100.00
Registered voters/turnout			704,198	80.32
Source: SLNEC

=== 2012 municipal elections ===
Party	Votes	%	Seats
Kulmiye	244,795	30.19	99
Waddani	163,789	20.20	68
For Justice and Development	105,105	12.96	40
Umadda	94,689	11.68	37
Rays	83,596	10.31	32
Xaqsoor	74,204	9.15	31
Dalsan	44,680	5.51	16
Total	810,858	100.00	323
Source: Africa Portal

=== 2010 presidential election ===
Candidate	Running mate	Party	Votes	%
Ahmed Mahamoud Silanyo	Abdirahman Saylici	Peace, Unity, and Development Party	266,906	49.59
Dahir Riyale Kahin	Ahmed Yusuf Yasin	United Peoples' Democratic Party	178,881	33.23
Faysal Ali Warabe	Mohammad Rashid	For Justice and Development	92,459	17.18
Total			538,246	100.00
Total votes			538,246	–
Registered voters/turnout			1,069,914	50.31
Source: NEC, African Elections Database

Elections were delayed several times, and were finally held on 26 June 2010.

=== 2005 parliamentary election ===
Party	Votes	%	Seats
United Peoples' Democratic Party	261,449	39.00	33
Peace, Unity, and Development Party	228,328	34.06	28
For Justice and Development	180,545	26.93	21
Total	670,322	100.00	82
Valid votes	670,322	99.32	
Invalid/blank votes	4,585	0.68	
Total votes	674,907	100.00	
Source: IRI

=== 2003 presidential election ===
Candidate	Running mate	Party	Votes	%
Dahir Riyale Kahin	Ahmed Yusuf Yasin	United Peoples' Democratic Party	205,595	42.08
Ahmed M. Mahamoud Silanyo	Abdirahman Saylici	Peace, Unity, and Development Party	205,515	42.07
Faysal Ali Warabe	Mohammad Rashid	For Justice and Development	77,433	15.85
Total			488,543	100.00
Valid votes			488,543	97.98
Invalid/blank votes			10,096	2.02
Total votes			498,639	100.00
Source: African Elections Database

=== 2002 municipal elections ===
Party	Votes	%
United Peoples' Democratic Party	179,389	40.76
Kulmiye	83,158	18.90
UCID	49,444	11.24
Sahan	47,942	10.89
Hormood	40,538	9.21
ASAD	39,596	9.00
Total	440,067	100.00
Source: African Elections Database

=== 2001 constitutional referendum ===
Choice	Votes	%
For	1,148,940	97.10
Against	34,302	2.90
Total	1,183,242	100.00
Valid votes	1,183,242	99.61
Invalid/blank votes	4,591	0.39
Total votes	1,187,833	100.00
Registered voters/turnout	1,188,746	99.92
Source: African Elections Database

== See also ==
- National Electoral Commission (Somaliland)
- Electoral calendar
- Electoral system
