= Parliament of Somaliland =

Bicameral legislature of Somaliland

Parliament of Somaliland Baarlamaanka Somaliland البرلمان في ارض الصومال

Type
- Type: Bicameral
- Houses: House of Elders; House of Representatives

History
- Founded: 1990

Leadership
- Speaker of the House of Elders: Suleiman Mohamoud Adan since August, 2004
- Speaker of the House of Representatives: Yasin Haji Mohamoud, Kulmiye since July, 2023

Meeting place
- Hargeisa, Somaliland

Website
- somalilandparliament.net

The Parliament of Somaliland consists of two chambers:

- The House of Elders (upper chamber)
- The House of Representatives (lower chamber)

The current speakership position was established in the 1990s, following the formation of the Somaliland polity. Since July 2023, Yasin Haji Mohamoud has been the Speaker of the House of Representatives of Somaliland, while Said Mire Farah is the first deputy speaker and Ali Hamud the second deputy speaker. The Speaker of the House of Elders is Suleiman Mohamoud Adan, who was elected in 2004.

== Elections ==
=== First elections ===
In 2002, Somaliland held its first multiparty municipal elections since independence, for district councils.

The following year in 2003, Somaliland held its first presidential elections. The result was a victory for incumbent President Dahir Riyale Kahin, who won by a margin of just 0.01%. The outcome was initially rejected by the main opposition, which led to violence and a subsequent ban on public protests for a ten-day period starting on 22 April. Nevertheless, the International Crisis Group labeled the election a democratic "milestone" for the breakaway state.

On 11 May the Somaliland Supreme Court endorsed Kahin's victory. He was sworn in on 16 May.

In 2005, Somaliland held its first parliamentary elections, the 82 members of the House of Representatives were elected by open list proportional representation with the six multi-member constituencies based on the regions. The number of seats for each region was based on those used for the 1960 elections and multiplied by 2.5

=== 2010 presidential elections ===
Ahmed Mohamed Mohamoud “Silanyo” (Kulmiye) defeated incumbent Dahir Riyale (UDUB). President Riyale had publicly announced that he would step down and hand over power peacefully if he was defeated.

President Riyale’s third term of office should have expired on 15 May 2008. The election that was to have been held at least one month earlier had been rescheduled six times. The last delay was ostensibly caused by the unilateral decision of the previous National Electoral Commission (NEC) not to use a voter registration list tainted by massive, systematic fraud. This prompted both opposition parties to declare an election boycott and suspend cooperation with the commission. The crisis was defused in September 2009, when the parties, under strong external and internal pressure, accepted a memorandum of understanding (MOU) agreeing to a change in the NEC’s leadership and composition.

=== 2012 municipal elections ===
In 2012, Municipal elections were held across Somaliland. Two of the existing parties, For Justice and Development and the Peace, Unity, and Development Party contested the elections alongside six newly registered political associations.

=== 2017 presidential elections ===
In November 2017, Presidential elections were held in Somaliland, Muse Bihi Abdi (Kulmiye) won with 55% against Irro, succeeding President Silanyo. The elections were initially postponed by six months due to a drought crisis in the region. The elections to elect the President and Vice President were eventually held separately on 13 November. Incumbent President Ahmed Mohamed Mohamoud of the Peace, Unity, and Development Party (Kulmiye) did not run for a second term.

=== 2021 presidential elections ===
Somaliland held nationwide elections in May 2021 for the first time in more than 10 years. The Muslim-democratic Waddani party won a plurality in the election. Still, it fell short of a majority and allied with the centre-left Justice and Welfare Party to form a majority.

=== 2024 presidential elections ===
In the next elections, the Somaliland National Electoral Commission (NEC) announced on November 19, 2024, that Abdirahman Mohamed Abdullahi (also known as “Irro”) of the Waddani Party won the presidency with 63.92% of the vote. Incumbent Muse Bihi Abdi (Kulmiye Party) received 34.81%, while third-party candidate Faysal Ali Warabe (UCID Party) garnered around 0.74%.

The election had a 53% voter turnout, with around 648,000 of the 1.2 million registered voters participating.

The Supreme Constitutional Court formally validated these results, confirming Irro’s victory along with that of his running mate, Mohamed Ali Abdi Mohamud, for vice president. The Court similarly approved Waddani as the leading political party, followed by Kulmiye and the newcomer KAAH Party replacing UCID in official party status for the next decade

== Gallery ==
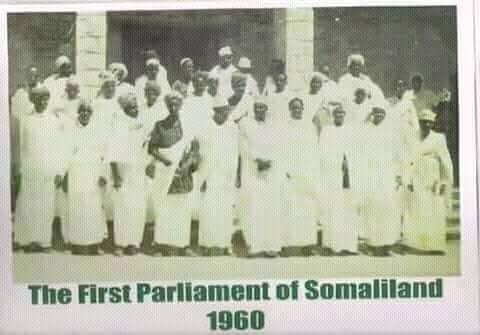
The First Parliament of Somaliland in 1960.

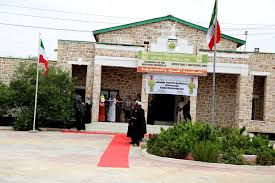
Somaliland Parliament old Building and now is Supreme Court of Somaliland Building

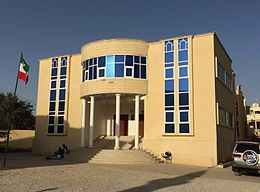
Somaliland Parliament Building

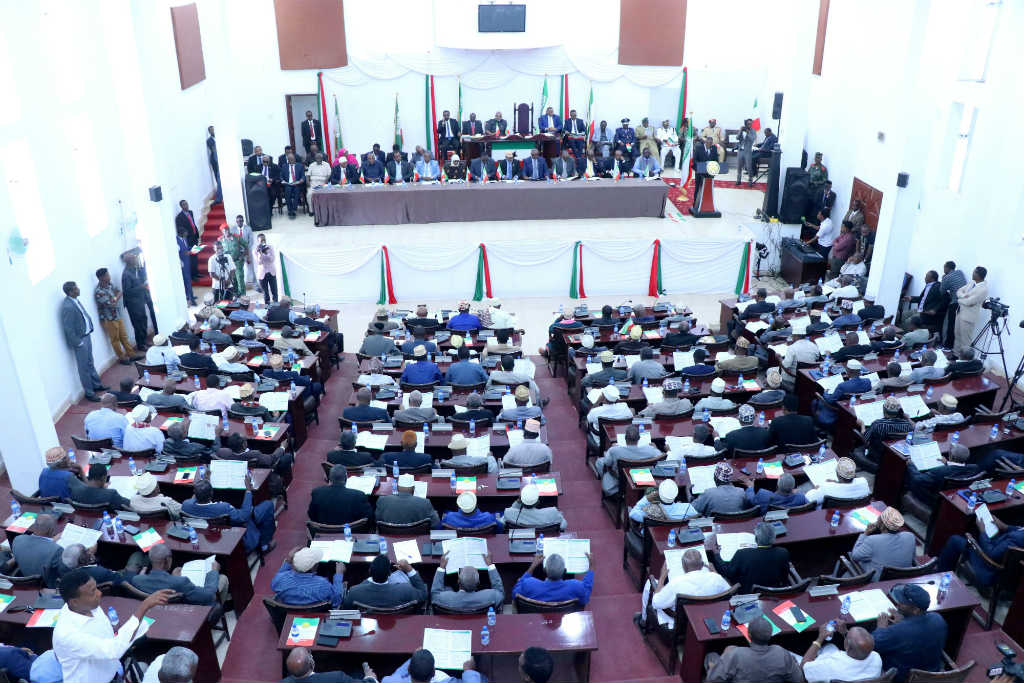
Somaliland Parliament Chamber
