= List of presidents of Somaliland =

This is a list of presidents of the Republic of Somaliland, a de facto sovereign state in the Horn of Africa, considered internationally to be part of Somalia. The Republic of Somaliland regards itself as the successor state to British Somaliland, which was independent for a few days in 1960 as the State of Somaliland. The President of Somaliland is the head of state and head of government of Somaliland. The president leads the executive branch of the Government of Somaliland and is the commander-in-chief of the Somaliland Armed Forces. The official residence of the president is the Presidential Palace in Hargeisa.

== List of officeholders ==
Political parties

Somali National Movement (SNM)
Independent
United Peoples' Democratic Party (UDUB)
Kulmiye Peace, Unity, and Development Party
Waddani

No.	Portrait	Name (Birth–Death)	Term of office			Political party	Elected	Cabinet(s)	Ref.
No.	Portrait	Name (Birth–Death)	Took office	Left office	Time in office	Political party	Elected	Cabinet(s)	Ref.
1		Abdirahman Ahmed Ali Tuur (1931–2003)	28 May 1991	16 May 1993	1 year, 353 days	SNM	1991	Tuur	
2		Muhammad Haji Ibrahim Egal (1928–2002)	16 May 1993	3 May 2002 #	8 years, 352 days	Independent (until July 2001)	1993	Egal	
2		Muhammad Haji Ibrahim Egal (1928–2002)	16 May 1993	3 May 2002 #	8 years, 352 days	Independent (until July 2001)	1997	Egal	
2		Muhammad Haji Ibrahim Egal (1928–2002)	16 May 1993	3 May 2002 #	8 years, 352 days	UDUB	1997	Egal	
3		Dahir Riyale Kahin (born 1952)	3 May 2002	27 July 2010	8 years, 85 days	UDUB	2003	Kahin	
4		Ahmed Mohamed Silanyo (1938–2024)	27 July 2010	13 December 2017	7 years, 139 days	Kulmiye	2010	Silanyo	
5		Muse Bihi Abdi (born 1948)	13 December 2017	13 December 2024	7 years, 0 days	Kulmiye	2017	Abdi	
6		Abdirahman Mohamed Irro (born 1956)	13 December 2024	Incumbent	1 year, 253 days	Waddani	2024	Irro	

== Latest election ==
Candidate	Running mate	Party	Votes	%
Abdirahman Mohamed Abdullahi Irro	Mohamed Aw-Ali Abdi	Waddani	407,908	63.95
Muse Bihi Abdi	Mohamoud Hassan Saajin	Peace, Unity, and Development Party	225,219	35.31
Faysal Ali Warabe	Abdirashid Duale Diriye	For Justice and Development	4,699	0.74
Total			637,826	100.00
Valid votes			637,826	98.45
Invalid/blank votes			10,037	1.55
Total votes			647,863	100.00
Registered voters/turnout			1,227,048	52.80
Source: HO, Registered

== See also ==
- President of Somaliland
- Vice President of Somaliland
- Lists of office-holders
