= Ahmed Yusuf Yasin =

4th vice president of Somaliland

- أحمد يوسف ياسين
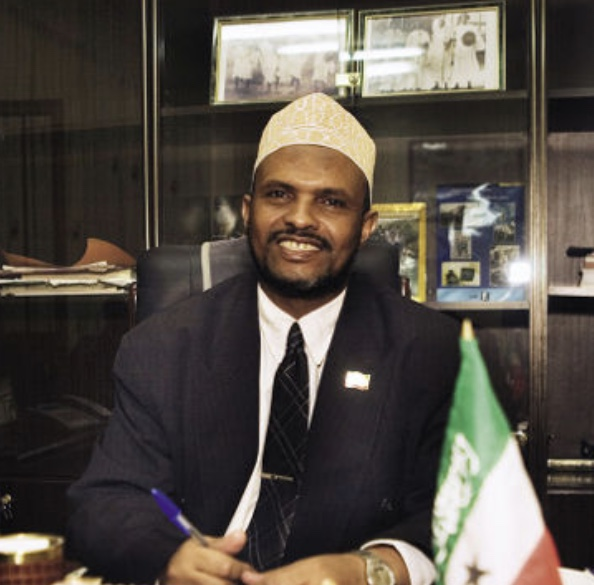

5th Vice President of Somaliland
- In office May 2002 – July 2010
- President: Dahir Riyale Kahin
- Preceded by: Dahir Riyale Kahin
- Succeeded by: Abdirahman Saylici

Personal details
- Born: 1957 (age 68–69) Hargeisa, British Somaliland (now Somaliland)
- Citizenship: Somalilander
- Party: United Peoples' Democratic Party

Ahmed Yusuf Yasin (Somali: Axmed Yuusuf Yaasiin) (born 1957) is a Somali politician and lawyer who was Vice President of Somaliland, from 2002 until 2010 and he was the second chairman of UDUB party. He hails from the Aden Isa sub-division of the Isamusa Isaaq Somali clan. He was appointed as vice president in 2002.

== Biography ==
=== Early life ===
In 1957, Ahmed was born in Hargeisa. He received Qur'anic education in Berbera. Therefore, he is generally considered to be from Berbera. From 1967 to 1974, he attended elementary and secondary school, and from 1974 to 1976, he pursued higher education in Hargeisa. He subsequently earned a diploma in accounting from the British Career Training College Jersey in the United Kingdom. Then he speaks Somali, English, and Arabic.

=== Early career ===
In 1993, he served as supervisor of a support program for the Saudi-U.S. Economic Cooperation Committee (JECOR), headquartered in Riyadh, Saudi Arabia. From 1993 to 1997, he served as manager of the livestock export company DUBAR.

From 1997 to 2002, he served as a member of the Somaliland House of Representatives, representing Sahil region. Although he was considered moderate and reserved within the House of Representatives, he was regarded as logical and well-organized when he took the floor to speak. In 1997, The Minister of Finance refused to draft the fiscal budget, citing the suspension of livestock imports, and requested that the government handle it at its discretion; however, Representative Ahmed Yusuf Yasin insisted, "I cannot sign a blank check.," and the legislature also demanded that the budget be submitted. As a result, a provisional budget covering six months was drafted.

Meanwhile, from 1995 to 1998 and in 2000, he studied a variety of subjects related to governance systems and computer science. As of May 2002, he was also a student at the Faculty of Law at the University of Hargeisa.

=== Inauguration as Vice President ===
In May 2002, following the death of President Egal, Vice President Dahir Riyale Kahin assumed the office of interim president in accordance with the Constitution. Dahir Riyale Kahin appointed Ahmed Yusuf Yasin as vice president.

In April 2003, the presidential election was held. In this election, the UDUB party, led by Dahir Riyale Kahin, emerged victorious. Ahmed Yusuf Yasin was re-elected vice president.

In April 2004, Haatuf reported that Ahmed Yusuf Yasin had a disagreement with President Dahir Riyale Kahin regarding the need for a cabinet reshuffle. Six days later, the reporter was arrested by police in Berbera. The reporter was subsequently indicted for publishing false information, sentenced to six months in prison with a suspended sentence, and released around noon that day. During the trial, the reporter was unable to receive legal counsel.

In early 2005, the government and the opposition clashed over the election law and the allocation of regional seats. Consequently, there was a need for "clear, effective, and widely accepted rules" to regulate election campaigns and the use of public resources, and to ensure that all political parties abide by the results. Consequently, under the leadership of the Academy for Peace and Development (APD)—Interpeace’s local partner organization—and the Somaliland National Electoral Commission, talks between the ruling and opposition parties proceeded, and the "Electoral Code of Conduct for the political parties" was signed in July 2005. Ahmed Yusuf Yasin signed it in his role as leader of the ruling party.

In April 2008, Ahmed Yusuf Yasin made his first visit to Las Anod, the capital of the Sool region, as head of a government delegation. The delegation was escorted by armored vehicles during the visit. The visit was met with a demonstration by several hundred residents who expressed dissatisfaction with the Somaliland presence. However, Ahmed Yusuf Yasin was welcomed there.

Under the Constitution, the terms of office for the president and vice president of Somaliland were five years, ending in May 2008, but the Somaliland House of Elders decided to extend them until March 2009, citing political instability in the eastern region.

In February 2009, Ahmed Yusuf Yasin, speaking at a ruling party ceremony in Hargeisa, congratulated the newly elected president of Somalia and expressed the view that, rather than completely separating or severing ties, Somaliland and Somalia could seek a cooperative relationship similar to that in Europe, where borders are not completely closed.

The National Electoral Commission requested that the terms of the president and vice president be extended by an additional year from 2009, citing the political situation at the time, economic issues, and technical problems as necessitating further time for election preparations, and the House of Elders approved this request.

In April 2010, Ahmed Yusuf Yasin received surgery at a hospital in Paris, France.

In June 2010, the ruling UDUB party, to which Ahmed Yusuf Yasin belonged, lost the Somaliland presidential election, and the candidates from the opposition Kulmiye party were elected president and vice president.

=== After resigning ===
In April 2011, during a telephone interview with the media, Ahmed Yusuf Yasin was asked whether he would run for a third term at UDUB. He replied, "Now is not the time. It is something one should do not because one declares it oneself, but because one is recommended."

In December 2015, Ahmed Yusuf Yasin spoke to the media about the political situation, called on the public to use the Somaliland shilling instead of the U.S. dollar, and commended the ruling Kulmiye Party for appointing opposition party members to government positions.

In March 2018, Ahmed Yusuf Yasin gave an interview to the media in which he criticized the Kulmiye administration, stating that while it had begun negotiations with Somalia—something the UDUB administration had not done—no progress had been made over the past seven years, and that further negotiations were meaningless.

In January 2025, political party licenses in Somaliland were renewed, and he attended the licensing ceremony in his capacity as former vice president.

Political offices
Preceded by Dahir Riyale Kahin	Vice President of Somaliland; 2002 June – July 2010	Succeeded by Abdirahman Saylici
