= 2024 Somaliland presidential election =

- 13 November 2024
- Turnout: 52.82%
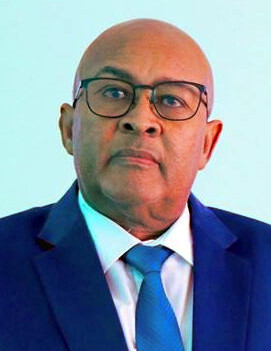

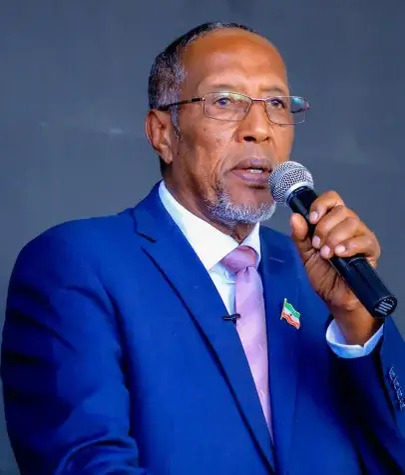
Nominee	Abdirahman Mohamed Abdullahi	Muse Bihi Abdi
Party	Waddani	Kulmiye
Running mate	Mohamed Aw-Ali Abdi	Mohamoud Hassan Saajin
Popular vote	407,908	225,519
Percentage	63.92%	35.34%
President before election
Muse Bihi Abdi
Kulmiye
Elected President
Abdirahman Mohamed Abdullahi
Waddani

Presidential elections were held in Somaliland on 13 November 2024. In the election, incumbent President Muse Bihi Abdi of the Kulmiye party was seeking a second and final term in office against the opposition candidates Abdirahman Mohamed Abdullahi "Irro" of the Waddani party, and Faysal Ali Warabe of the UCID party. The election was held concurrently with an election to determine the three national political parties for the next decade.

The election, which had an expected turnout of over one million people across two thousand polling stations, marked the fourth election in the de facto nation's history. Alongside the restarting of the Las Anod conflict in the nation's east, which had delayed the election from taking place on the originally planned date of 13 November 2022, important issues voters wanted addressed by the next president included the economy/inflation, food security, job availability and the recognition of the nation on the global stage. The election was won by Abdullahi.

Seen from a larger regional perspective, the 2024 Somaliland election was one out of a total of five presidential elections in Africa in 2024 that ended with a transfer of power from the incumbent to the opposition (the others being Senegal, Mauritius, Botswana and Ghana). This was the most significant power transfer in a single electoral year in Africa since the rebirth of constitutional rule on the continent in the early 1990s.

== Background ==
The election marked the fourth direct presidential election since Somaliland's adoption of a one-person one vote system. The election was originally scheduled to be held in 2022 but was postponed by two years by the House of Elders, due to unresolved disputes between the government and the oppositions parties. Following the elections postponement, civil unrest broke out in the countries eastern Sool region after a man was killed. The unrest would ultimately lead to the start of the ongoing Las Anod conflict and Somaliland losing control of parts of Sool it had controlled since 2007.

On 1 January 2024, during the lead up to the election, President Bihi signed a Memorandum of Understanding (MoU) with Ethiopian Prime Minister Abiy Ahmed. The signing of this MOU led to controversy in the greater region and prompted criticism from the Government of Somalia and its allies.

== Electoral system ==
According to the constitution of Somaliland, presidential elections are to be held every five years. On 24 September 2022, the National Electoral Commission announced that the elections, initially scheduled for 13 November 2022, had been postponed to July 2023. On 1 October 2022, the House of Elders voted to further postpone the elections by two years instead of the nine months previously recommended by the National Electoral Commission, effectively scheduling the election for November 2024. On 8 January 2024, the House of Elders were able to agree on election-related specifics, and voting was set to take place on 13 November 2024.

== Candidates ==
Incumbent President Muse Bihi Abdi of Kulmiye Peace, Unity, and Development Party (Kulmiye) was eligible to seek a second and final term in office, having first been elected in 2017. He was confirmed as his party's candidate during the party's 2023 convention in Burco. President Bihi ran alongside a new running mate, Minister of Commerce Mohamoud Hassan Saajin. This is due to Vice President Abdirahman Saylici reaching his term limit, having serviced two terms as Vice President (first serving one term under President Silanyo and then a second under President Bihi). The two opposition parties of Waddani and the UCID have also announced their respective candidates for the presidency. Abdirahman Mohamed Irro ran as the candidate for the Waddani party, having also been the party's candidate in 2017. Faysal Ali Warabe ran as the UCID candidate for the fourth consecutive time, making him the only person to be a candidate in all direct presidential elections held in Somaliland since 2003.

Abdi's campaign focused on gathering diplomatic recognition for Somaliland, while Abdullahi's focused more on democratic reforms and social cohesion, and Warabe's for national unity. Somaliland's representative to Kenya, Mohamed A. Mohamoud, stated that the entity was optimistic that Donald Trump, who had been elected as US president days prior, would recognize Somaliland as an independent state from Somalia. The election was also set to decide if a controversial deal with Ethiopia which involved granting the landlocked nation sea access in the form of a naval base at the Port of Berbera, in return for an "in-depth assessment" of recognition.

== Conduct ==
Direct voting began on 13 November 2024. According to interviews taken with locals, major issues voters wanted addressed included the economy/inflation, food security, and job availability. Voter turnout was suspected to be more than one million at over two thousand polling stations. Bihi publicly cast his vote, praying for a democratic "transfer of power in peace". The Somaliland National Electoral Commission (NEC) announced polls closed without issue by 6pm local time, and that votes will be counted and a winner announced by 21 November.

International observers described the campaigning period and the election day as generally peaceful.

== Results ==
Official results released on 19 November showed that Abdirahman Mohamed Abdullahi had won 63.92% of the vote, while incumbent president Muse Bihi Abdi received 34.81%. The election was considered a landslide win for the opposition and a turning point as they come to power for the first time in 14 years.

Abdullahi reacted in a conciliatory tone stating that "everyone had won" and that "no one was defeated", and that it was "an election of brotherhood, aimed at unifying the people".

The incumbent Bihi's loss was attributed to his widespread unpopularity, caused by several contentious decisions, in particular the extension of his presidential term in 2022, which led to deadly protests, and the mishandling of the dispute with the Eastern Sool.

Candidate	Running mate	Party	Votes	%
Abdirahman Mohamed Abdullahi	Mohamed Aw-Ali Abdi	Waddani	407,908	63.92
Muse Bihi Abdi	Mohamoud Hassan Saajin	Peace, Unity, and Development Party	225,519	35.34
Faysal Ali Warabe	Abdirashid Duale Diriye	For Justice and Development	4,699	0.74
Total			638,126	100.00
Valid votes			638,126	98.45
Invalid/blank votes			10,037	1.55
Total votes			648,163	100.00
Registered voters/turnout			1,227,048	52.82
Source: HO, Registered

=== By district ===
District won by Waddani
District won by Kulmiye

#	Region	District	Waddani		Kulmiye		UCID		Total votes		Margin	
#	Region	District	Votes	%	Votes	%	Votes	%	Votes	%	Votes	%
1	Awdal	Zeila	5,281	67.3%	2,446	31.2%	15	0.2%	7,843	1.2%	2,835	36.1%
2	Awdal	Lughaya	5,360	79.5%	1,206	17.9%	16	0.2%	6,745	1.0%	4,154	61.6%
3	Awdal	Borama	44,771	75.0%	13,154	22.0%	155	0.3%	59,688	9.2%	31,617	53.0%
4	Awdal	Baki	11,923	90.6%	1,085	8.2%	25	0.2%	13,166	2.0%	10,838	82.3%
5	Maroodi Jeex	Gabiley	7,559	13.7%	46,103	83.7%	234	0.4%	55,087	8.5%	38,544	70.0%
6	Maroodi Jeex	Hargeisa	130,111	54.2%	103,412	43.1%	3,090	1.3%	240,156	37.1%	26,699	11.1%
7	Maroodi Jeex	Baligubadle	4,727	46.2%	5,308	51.9%	60	0.6%	10,224	1.6%	581	5.7%
8	Maroodi Jeex	Salahlay	8,178	85.7%	979	10.3%	260	2.7%	9,542	1.5%	7,199	75.4%
9	Sahil	Berbera	13,390	41.7%	18,143	56.5%	130	0.4%	32,101	5.0%	4,753	14.8%
10	Sahil	Sheikh	5,823	50.6%	5,581	48.5%	23	0.2%	11,508	1.8%	242	2.1%
11	Togdheer	Burao	80,513	80.0%	18,642	18.5%	399	0.4%	100,642	15.5%	61,871	61.5%
12	Togdheer	Odweyne	26,918	96.7%	782	2.8%	42	0.2%	27,838	4.3%	26,136	93.9%
13	Togdheer	Buhoodle	3,410	85.9%	510	12.9%	18	0.5%	3,968	0.6%	2,900	73.1%
14	Sool	Aynabo	13,136	80.6%	2,823	17.3%	98	0.6%	16,295	2.5%	10,313	63.3%
15	Sool	Las Anod	0	–	0	–	0	–	0	–	–	–
16	Sool	Hudun	1,436	97.4%	31	2.1%	0	0.0%	1,474	0.2%	1,405	95.3%
17	Sool	Taleh	0	–	0	–	0	–	0	–	–	–
18	Sanag	Garadag	5,520	74.3%	1,818	24.5%	15	0.2%	7,425	1.1%	3,702	49.9%
19	Sanag	El Afweyn	11,314	87.7%	1,315	10.2%	33	0.3%	12,899	2.0%	9,999	77.5%
20	Sanag	Erigavo	28,538	91.3%	2,181	7.0%	86	0.3%	31,262	4.8%	26,357	84.3%
21	Sanag	Badhan	0	–	0	–	0	–	0	–	–	–
22	Sanag	Dhahar	0	–	0	–	0	–	0	–	–	–
Grand Total			407,908	63.9%	225,519	35.3%	4,699	0.7%	647,863	100.0%	182,389	28.6%
Source: Somaliland National Electoral Commission

== Reactions ==
- (Djibouti) Djiboutian president Ismail Omar Guelleh expressed congratulations to Abdullahi after winning the election.
- The Ministry of Foreign Affairs of Ethiopia congratulated the people of Somaliland on the conduct of a peaceful and democratic election.
- Somalia's Prime Minister Hamza Abdi Barre congratulated Abdullahi.
- Taiwan's representative office in Somaliland extended congratulations to president-elect Abdullahi.
- The United States Bureau of African Affairs congratulated the people of Somaliland for the successful election, adding that the United States looks forward to working with President-elect Abdullahi to "advance peace, stability, and prosperity". Likewise, the United States Embassy said that Somaliland's "impressive record of elections and peaceful transfers of power is a model for the region and beyond."
