= 2010 Cayn Clashes =

- Part of Puntland-Somaliland dispute
Date	2010
Location	Togdheer, Cayn, Somaliland
Result	Somaliland victory

Belligerents
Somaliland	SSC-Khatumo

Commanders and leaders
Unknown	Unknown

Strength
Unknown	Unknown

Casualties and losses
Unknown	5 killed Thousands displaced

The 2010 Cayn Clashes involved an operation by Somaliland forces against the SSC (Sool, Sanaag, and Cayn) militias in the Sool and Togdheer region of Somaliland. These engagements were part of a broader effort to stabilize the region ahead of the 2010 Somaliland presidential election.

== Background ==
The Sool region, a contested area between Somaliland and Puntland, had seen increasing tension from various militias, including the SSC, who sought greater autonomy. In 2010, as Somaliland prepared for its presidential election, there were fears that unrest could destabilize the electoral process. This prompted Somaliland's government, with support from Ethiopian forces, to take military action to subdue the militias in the region.

== Clashes ==
In July 2010, Somaliland forces clashed with the SSC militias in the Buhodle region, resulting in several casualties. The operation was aimed at consolidating Somaliland's control over the contested Sool region and ensuring the safety of the presidential election.

== Aftermath ==
The fighting resulted in significant displacement of civilians, with thousands forced to flee the region due to the violence. The clashes raised concerns about the stability of Somaliland, a region generally viewed as more secure than the rest of Somalia. The military action was seen as a direct effort to prevent further disruptions ahead of the 2010 presidential elections.
