= 2027 Somaliland parliamentary election =

- March 2027

All 82 seats in the House of Representatives 42 seats needed for a majority
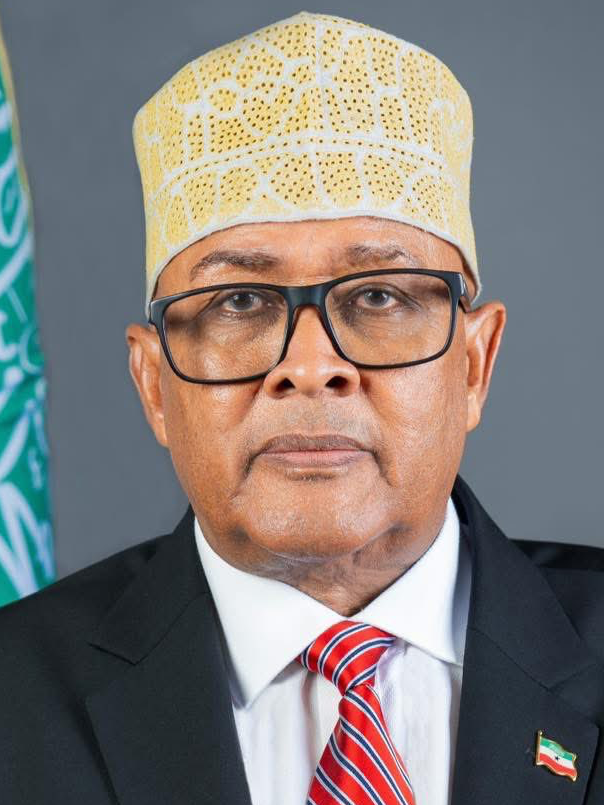

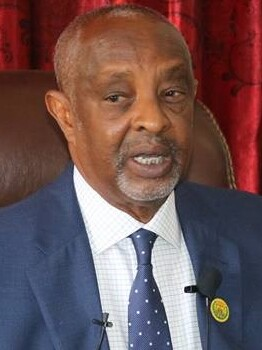

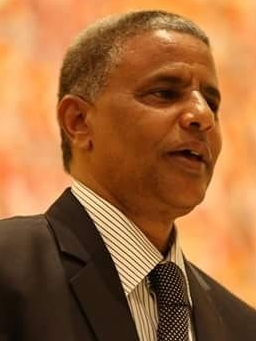
Leader	Abdirahman Mohamed Abdullahi	Mohamed Kahin Ahmed	Mohamoud Hashi Abdi
Party	Waddani	Kulmiye	Kaah
Leader since	2012	2023	2022
Last election	37.22%, 31 seats	36.91%, 30 seats	-
- The six regions of Somaliland act as electoral constituencies
Incumbent Speaker
Yasin Haji Mohamoud
Kulmiye

Parliamentary elections are scheduled to be held in Somaliland in March 2027, having been postponed from May 2026.

== Electoral system ==
The 82 MPs in the lower House of Representatives of Somaliland are elected in six multi-member constituencies coterminous with the regions of Somaliland, using open list proportional representation for a five-year term. There is a constitutional limit of three legal political parties at the national level. Citizens aged 15 or older are able to vote.
