= Quljeed =

Quljeed ቁልጂድ
- Town
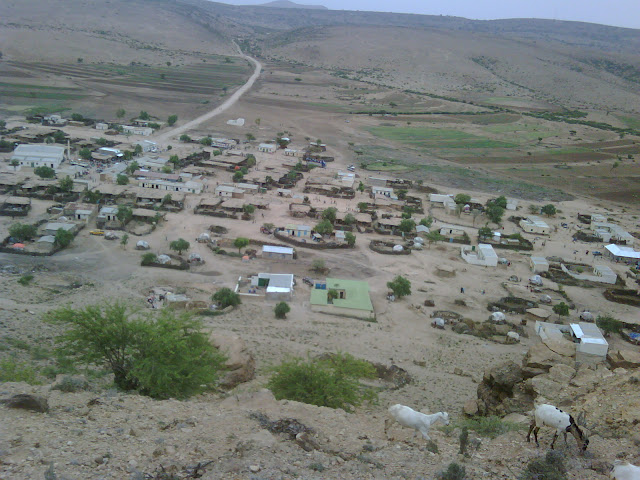

- Location in Somaliland Quljeed (Somaliland)
- Coordinates: 10°05′29″N 43°00′33″E
- Country: Somaliland
- Region: Awdal
- Time zone: UTC+3 (EAT)

Quljeed is a town in the western Awdal region of Somaliland. It is notable for being the birthplace of Dahir Riyale Kahin, the 3rd President of Somaliland.

== Overview ==
Quljeed is situated about 30 km to the northwest of Borama.

== Demographics ==
The town is inhabited by the Reer Dudub branch of the Jibriil Yoonis, a subclan of the Gadabuursi Dir clan.

== See also ==
- Nimmo
- Gondal
