= Presidential Palace, Somaliland =

Building in Hargeisa, Somaliland

Somaliland Presidential Palace
- Qasriga Madaxtooyada Jamhuuriyadda Soomaaliland
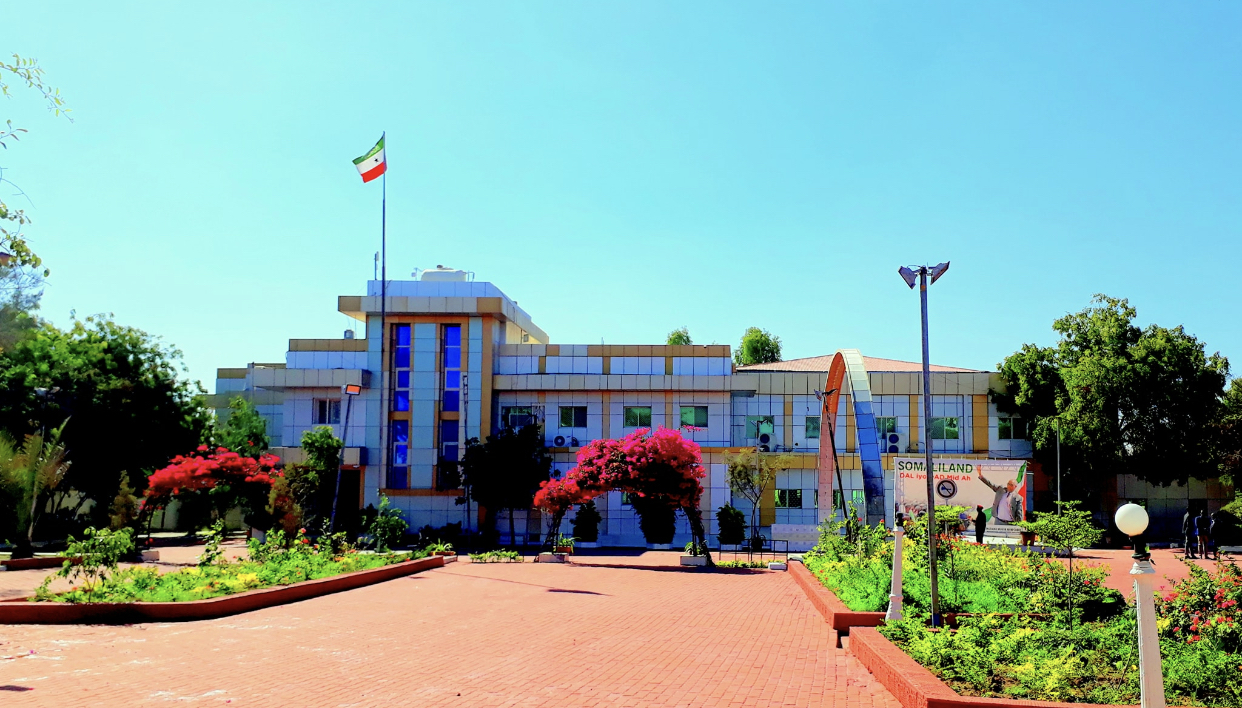
- Presidential Palace, Hargeisa
- Alternative names: State House, Hergeisa

General information
- Location: Road 1, Presidency Street, 26 June Avenue, Hargeisa, Maroodi Jeex, Somaliland
- Coordinates: 9.559589°N 44.053124°E
- Current tenants: Abdirahman Mohamed Abdullahi, President of Somaliland and the First Family
- Completed: 1952; 74 years ago

Website
- madaxtooyadajsl.com

The Somaliland Presidential Palace (Somali: Qasriga Madaxtooyada Jamhuuriyadda Soomaaliland, Arabic: القصر الرئاسي الصوماليلاندي), also known as the State House, is the official residence and administrative headquarters of the President of Somaliland. Situated in the capital city of Hargeisa, the palace serves as the central hub for executive governance and state functions.

== Overview ==
The presidential palace, or state house was constructed in 1952 on a vast estate to the southwest of Hargeisa's city centre by the British protectorate administration to serve as a residence for Queen Elizabeth II in anticipation of a visit. The state house served as the official residence of the British governor of the Somaliland Protectorate and was used to host dignitaries and entertain them on its golf course and in its gardens. The state house was considered the jewel in British Somaliland's crown.

After Somaliland's independence and unification with Somalia in 1960 the palace served as a government guesthouse and as the official residence of the Mogadishu-appointed governors of the then North-West region (today Maroodi Jeex), and was named Villa Hargeisa. The palace was destroyed in 1988 during the Battle of Hargeisa in the Somaliland War of Independence.

The palace has hosted numerous international delegations, including delegations from the United Kingdom, the European Union, Denmark, Sweden, Switzerland, Norway, the Czech Republic, and France.

== See also ==
- President of Somaliland
