= Bashe Mohamed Farah =

Somali politician

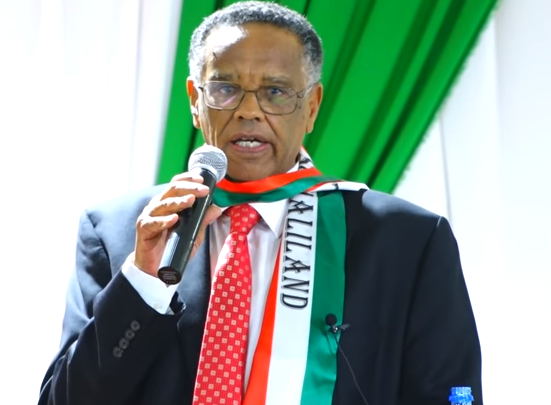

5th Speaker of the Somaliland House of Representatives
- In office 6 August 2017 – 3 August 2021
- Preceded by: Abdirahman Mohamed Abdullahi
- Succeeded by: Abdirisak Khalif Ahmed

Personal details
- Born: Las Anod, British Somaliland (now Somaliland)
- Party: Peace, Unity, and Development Party

Bashe Mohamed Farah (Somali: Baashe Maxamed Faarax, Arabic: باشى محمد فارح) is a Somali politician who was the speaker of the House of Representatives of Somaliland.

== Career ==
Farah began his political career in 2005, when he was elected to Somaliland's House of Representatives as a member for the Sool region. He then was appointed deputy speaker in 2012, and served in that capacity until 2017 when he was elected Speaker of the House after the resignation of his predecessor, Abdirahman Mohamed Abdullahi.

Preceded by Abdirahman Mohamed Abdullahi	Speaker of House of Representatives of Somaliland; 2017-2021	Succeeded by Abdirisak Khalif
