= 2022 Somaliland protests =

- Date: 11–12 August 2022
- Duration: 2 days
- Location: Hargeisa, Burao, and Erigavo, Somaliland
- Type: Political protests
- Deaths: 5
- Injuries: >100

On 11 August 2022, 5 people were killed and more than 100 injured in widespread protests in the cities of Hargeisa, Burao, and Erigavo after negotiations between the Somaliland government and opposition parties broke down, with the latter accusing Somaliland president Muse Bihi Abdi and his officials of purposely finding ways to delay the upcoming 13 November election.

== Protests ==
According to the nation's Deputy Police Commander Abdi Hassan Mire, the protesters were armed with "knives, catapults, clubs," and guns, as well as carried placards which said "Hold the election on 13th November 2022" and chanted anti-government slogans.

Internet in the nation reportedly received "significant disruptions across multiple providers," according to internet monitoring organization NetBlocks in wake on the protests, hampering up-to-date reporting of the protests as they unfolded.

== Reactions and aftermath ==
A statement condemning the "excessive use of force" used by authorities to extinguish the anti-government protests was signed by the EU, UK, and the US, which also called for "all sides in Somaliland to engage in constructive dialogue in order to reach consensus on a roadmap for elections".

On 13 August President Abdi addressed the nation on national TV about the protests that were held the day before. He announced that 5 people had been killed in the protests, and claimed that the protests were ultimately organized by the leaders of Wadani and UCID parties after "learning from" the recent Sri Lanka protests in which "protesters forced their leaders out of office".

President Mohamud of Somalia in a short video published by the president's office, called on the nation's political parties to resolve their differences through dialogue rather than through violent protests.

Chairman of the opposition Waddani party Hirsi Ali Haji Hassan announced in 14 August that the protests, which killed five and injured 100 on mainly 11 August, "will continue [again] and we will not stop". He added the reason for the break in protests on 12 and 13 August was "to visit the wounded, find out about the arrested, and attend the funeral of the buried". According to the BBC, attempts to mediate the conflict between the ruling and opposition parties have largely failed.

The Waddani and UCID opposition parties jointly appointed a committee consisting of nine members, four of whom were members of the House of Representatives, to investigate the recent violent protests and any crimes they may have been committed during them.

On 15 August a trial was held at a regional court for several demonstrators, including Horyaal 24 TV reporters Ahmed-Zaki and Abdinasir, who were arrested during the 11 August protests for their participation in the event.

The CPJ demanded on 17 August the unconditional release of Horyaal 24 TV reporter Ahmed-Zaki Ibrahim Mohamood and his cameraman Abdinasir Abdi Nour from Mandera Prison after they were arrested during the 11 August protests and sent to prison after being put on a reportedly unfair trial on 15 August.

On 18 August The Somaliland Strategic Advisory Group (SL-SAG) announced their concern for the current political situation in the nation, followed by releasing three recommendations aimed toward the nation's political parties, stakeholders, and citizens to work together to "protect peace and stability".

On 24 August another day of protests took place in Erigavo, where demonstrators took to the streets to demand that the presidential elections should take place on time on 13 November. Streets were reportedly blocked as some burned tires and other objects in the roadways before police arrived.
