= Waddani =

Political party in Somaliland

Somaliland National Party Xisbiga Waddani ee Somaliland
- Chairman: Hersi Ali Haji Hassan
- President of Somaliland: Abdirahman Mohamed Irro
- Vice President of Somaliland: Mohamed Aw-Ali Abdi
- Founder: Abdirahman Mohamed Irro
- Founded: 2012
- Split from: UCID
- Headquarters: Hargeisa
- Ideology: Somalilander nationalism; Populism; Islamic democracy; Social democracy; Social conservatism
- Political position: Centre-left
- House of Representatives: 31 / 82
- Local councillors: 79 / 220

Party flag

The Somaliland National Party (Somali: Xisbiga Waddani ee Somaliland, lit. 'Patriotic Party of Somaliland', Arabic: الحزب القومي الصوماليلاندي), sometimes referred to as the Waddani National Party and better known by its shortened Somali form Waddani (stylised in all caps), is a political party in Somaliland. The party was founded by Abdirahman Mohamed Abdullahi (Irro) in 2012, ahead of the second municipal elections later that year. On 16 November 2021 Hersi Ali Haji Hassan was elected as the new chairman of the opposition party.

Economically the party is social democratic and leans left, defending the establishment of a universal healthcare system, public investment and doubling resources in education. It is progressive on issues regarding minority rights and fundamental freedoms, such as proposing a quorum of 30% of women in parliament. The party also supports greater decentralisation. Additionally, the party places great importance on Islamic moral and cultural heritage, and intends to give it a more important place in the education system and in the establishment of laws. The party's economic and diplomatic policy is also more nationalist than that of its rivals, and this nationalism also applies to issues of defense, with the party promising to increase funding dedicated to the army.

The constitution of Somaliland only allows for the top three political parties to contest elections, to avoid the previous proliferation of clan-based parties in the 1960s. Waddani became one of the three in 2012, replacing the United Peoples' Democratic Party (UDUB).

== 2017 Somaliland presidential election ==
Presidential elections were held on 13 November 2017, the third direct presidential election since 2003. General elections had been scheduled to be held on 27 March 2017 to elect both the President and House of Representatives, but were postponed by six months due to the drought condition in the region. The elections to elect the President and Vice President were eventually held separately on 13 November. Incumbent President Ahmed Mohamed Mohamoud of the Peace, Unity, and Development Party (Kulmiye) did not run for a second term.

The result was a victory for ruling Kulmiye party candidate Muse Bihi Abdi, who received 55% of the vote.

Candidate	Party	Votes	%
Muse Bihi Abdi	Peace, Unity, and Development Party	305,909	55.10
Abdirahman Mohamed Abdullahi	Waddani	226,092	40.73
Faisal Ali Warabe	For Justice and Development	23,141	4.17
Invalid/blank votes		10,475	–
Total		565,617	100
Registered voters/turnout		704,198	80.32
Source: SLNEC

== 2021 Somaliland parliamentary election ==
Parliamentary elections were held in Somaliland on 31 May 2021, the first since 2005. On 6 June it was announced that Waddani had received 31 out of 82 seats and it will form a coalition with the Justice and Welfare Party (UCID). The coalition will have 52 seats combined, compared to previous ruling party Kulmiye which has only 30.

Party	Votes	%	Seats	+/–
Waddani	258,658	37.22	31	New
Kulmiye Peace, Unity, and Development Party	256,524	36.91	30	+2
Justice and Welfare Party	179,735	25.86	21	0
Total	694,917	100.00	82	0
Registered voters/turnout	1,065,847	–		
Source: EC, Reuters, EC

== Election results ==
=== Presidential elections ===
Election	Party candidate	Votes	%	Result
2017	Abdirahman Mohamed Abdullahi "Irro"	226,092	40.73%	Lost ✗
2024	Abdirahman Mohamed Abdullahi "Irro"	407,908	63.92%	Elected ✓

=== Parliamentary elections ===
Election	Votes	%	Seats	+/–	Position
2021	259,144	37.23%	31 / 82	New	▲1st
2027	TBD	TBD	TBD		

=== Local elections ===
Election	Votes	%	Seats	+/–	Position
2012	244,795	30.19%	68 / 323	▲68	▲2nd
2021	260,841	37.83%	79 / 220	▲11	2nd
2027	TBD	TBD	TBD		

== See also ==
- List of Islamic political parties
- List of political parties in Somaliland
