= Abdirahman Saylici =

5th vice president of Somaliland

- عبد الرحمن زيلعي
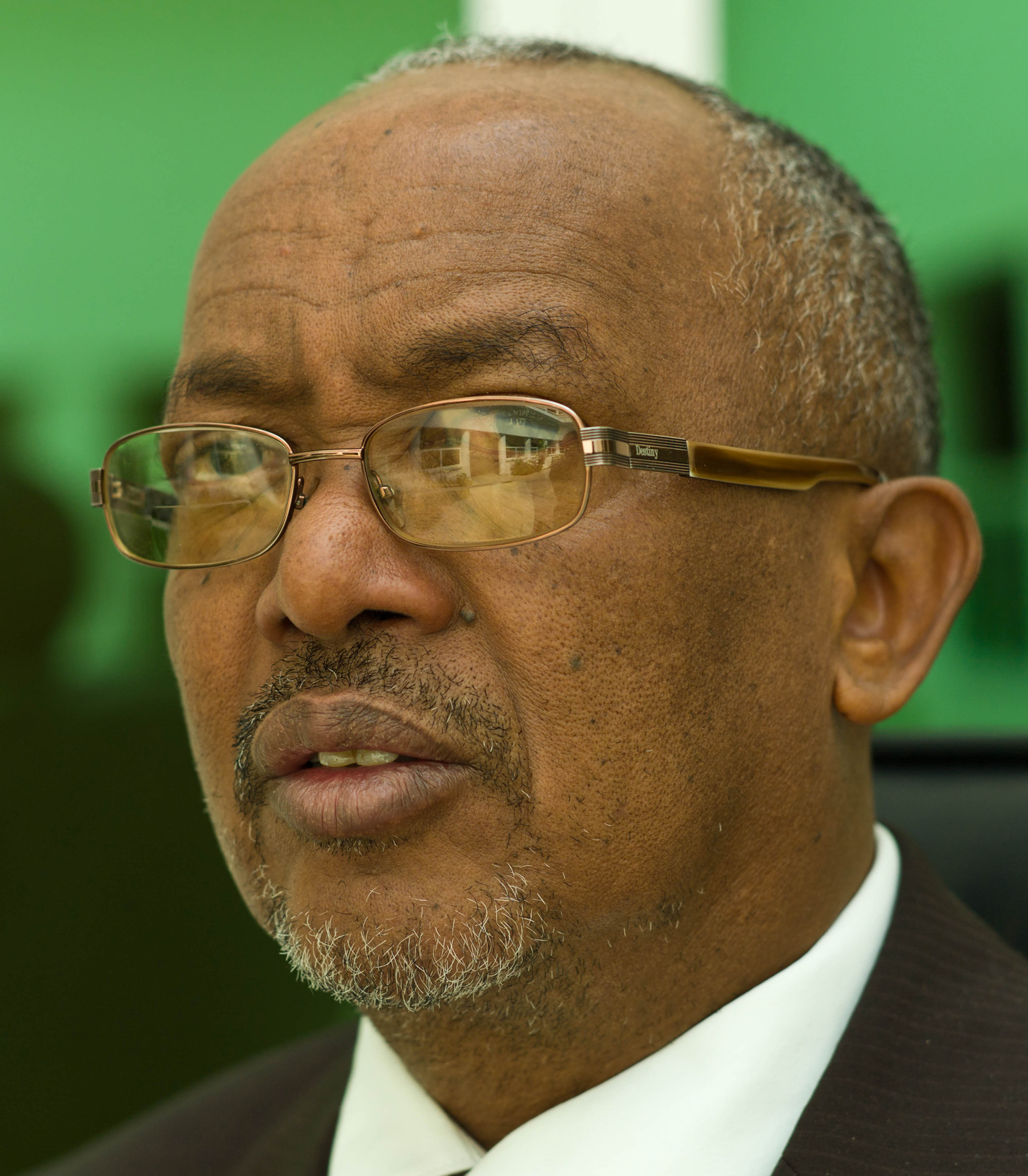
- Saylici in 2011

5th Vice President of Somaliland
- In office 27 July 2010 – 13 December 2024
- President: Ahmed Mohamed Mohamoud; Muse Bihi Abdi
- Preceded by: Ahmed Yusuf Yasin
- Succeeded by: Mohamed Aw-Ali Abdi

Personal details
- Born: 28 October 1956 (age 69) Zeila, British Somaliland (now Somaliland)
- Citizenship: Somalilander
- Party: Peace, Unity, and Development Party
- Education: Hargeisa Technical Institute

Abdirahman Abdillahi Ismail Saylici (Somali: Cabdiraxmaan Cabdilaahi Ismaaciil Saylici, Arabic: عبد الرحمن عبد الله إسماعيل زيلعي) (born 28 October 1956) is a Somaliland politician and former businessman who served as 5th Vice President of Somaliland from 2010 to 2024, after winning the election of 2010 together with Ahmed Mohamed Mohamoud Silanyo. He continued as vice president in the cabinet of Muse Bihi Abdi. Both are members of the Peace, Unity, and Development Party (Kulmiye Party).

== Biography ==
=== Early Days ===
Abdirahman was born on 28 October 1956 in Zeila, then British Somaliland (now Somaliland). He is from the Gadabuursi clan.

He completed his primary and intermediate education in Borama, the capital of the western Awdal region after which he then moved to Hargeisa to pursue his higher education. He attended the Hargeisa Technical Institute between 1975 and 1979 where he graduated as a construction engineer.

Before entering politics, Abdirahman was a businessman. He ran Borama Construction Company (BCC), which contributed to the building of many regions of Somaliland between 1980 and 2002.

In 2003 Abdirahman joined the Kulmiye party.

=== 2010 Somaliland Presidential and Vice Presidential Elections ===
In 2008, the terms of the president and vice president would came to an end, the opposition party Kulmiye proceeded with selecting its presidential and vice presidential candidates, and Saylici became one of vice presidential candidates.

On 2 May 2008, a ceremony was held in Saylac to mark the creation of the new “Selel” regional administration. Among the attendees were government ministers, local officials, and delegations from Djibouti and Yemen, as well as Kulmiye vice-chairman and vice-presidential candidate Abdirahman Abdillahi Ismail Saylici, who led a Samaroon (Gadabuursi) delegation. The event drew about a thousand participants and was reported amid concerns that clan competition in the drought-affected area could create local tensions if not fairly managed.

In August 2008, several politicians from the Awdal region competed within the Kulmiye party for the position of vice-presidential candidate. By September, the competition had narrowed to two figures, Saylici and Abdirahman Aw Ali Farrah. Later reports indicated that the party unified behind Saylici as the sole nominee for the vice-presidential position.

The election was eventually held in June 2010, and Abdirahman Abdillahi Ismail was elected Vice-President of Somaliland.

=== Vice President with President Silanyo ===
In September 2011, the Government of Somaliland dispatched a delegation to Mogadishu in what was described as its first official visit to Somalia since declaring re-independence in 1991, organized as a humanitarian effort to deliver drought and famine aid. Vice-President Abdirahman Abdillahi Ismail Saylici stated that the visit was purely humanitarian and not political. Reports described the mission as the first humanitarian relief initiative by Somaliland to assist drought-affected communities in Mogadishu.

On 19 June 2013, Vice-President Saylici visited Borama in the Awdal region and met with Ugaas Abdirashiid Ugaas Rooble, the traditional leader of the Gadabuursi clan. According to the local press, Saylici said, "It is a pleasure to meet you as the Ugaas of the Gadabuursi clan", and the Ugaas welcomed him as "to your land and people".

=== Vice President with President Muse Bihi Abdi ===
He ran alongside Muse Bihi Abdi in the subsequent 2017 election where he was re-elected as vice-president.

On 23 February 2019, Saylici visited Borama again and was received by ministers, traditional elders and lawmakers, as reported by local media.

During the COVID-19 pandemic, Vice-President Saylici chaired Somaliland’s National Preparedness Committee for COVID-19. In April 2020, the committee announced a temporary ban on khat imports as part of the government’s outbreak control measures. Later that month, Saylici stated in an interview that there could be more COVID-19 cases than the six officially confirmed. In June 2020, the government lifted all COVID-19 restrictions after a review of emergency measures. In March 2021, Saylici tested positive for COVID-19 and urged citizens to comply with public health guidelines.

In October 2020, Saylici relinquished his position as the 4th Deputy Chairman of the Kulmiye Party, transferring it to Mohamoud Hassan Saad.

In August 2023, the Kulmiye Party elected incumbent President Muse Bihi Abdi as its presidential candidate, and selected Mohamoud Hassan Saad as the party’s vice-presidential candidate instead of Saylici.

On 11 October 2023, Saylici officiated the commissioning ceremony of a water-supply expansion project in Borama, in which local community and regional officials participated.

In the 2024 election, Saylici endorsed presidential challenger Abdirahman Mohamed Abdullahi instead of his former ally Muse Bihi Abdi. The Muse government lost power and Abdirahman's administration was inaugurated on December 12, 2024.

=== After that ===
In January 2025, Somaliland awarded official licenses to its three national political parties for the next decade, and Abdirahman Abdillahi Ismail (Saylici) attended the ceremony as a former vice president.

Political offices
Preceded by Ahmed Yusuf Yasin	Vice President of Somaliland; 2010–2024	Succeeded by Mohamed Aw-Ali Abdi
