= House of Representatives (Somaliland) =

Lower house of Somaliland

House of Representatives Golaha Wakiilada مجلس النواب Majlis al-Nuwaab
- 5th House of Representatives

Type
- Type: Bicameral

History
- Founded: 1991

Leadership
- Speaker: Yasin Haji Mohamoud, Kulmiye since 23 July 2023

Structure
- Seats: 82 members
- Political groups: Majority (52): Waddani (31); UCID (21); Minority (30): Kulmiye (30)
- Length of term: 5 years

Elections
- Voting system: Open list proportional representation (regions as constituencies, three party maximum)
- Last election: 31 May 2021
- Next election: 2027

Meeting place
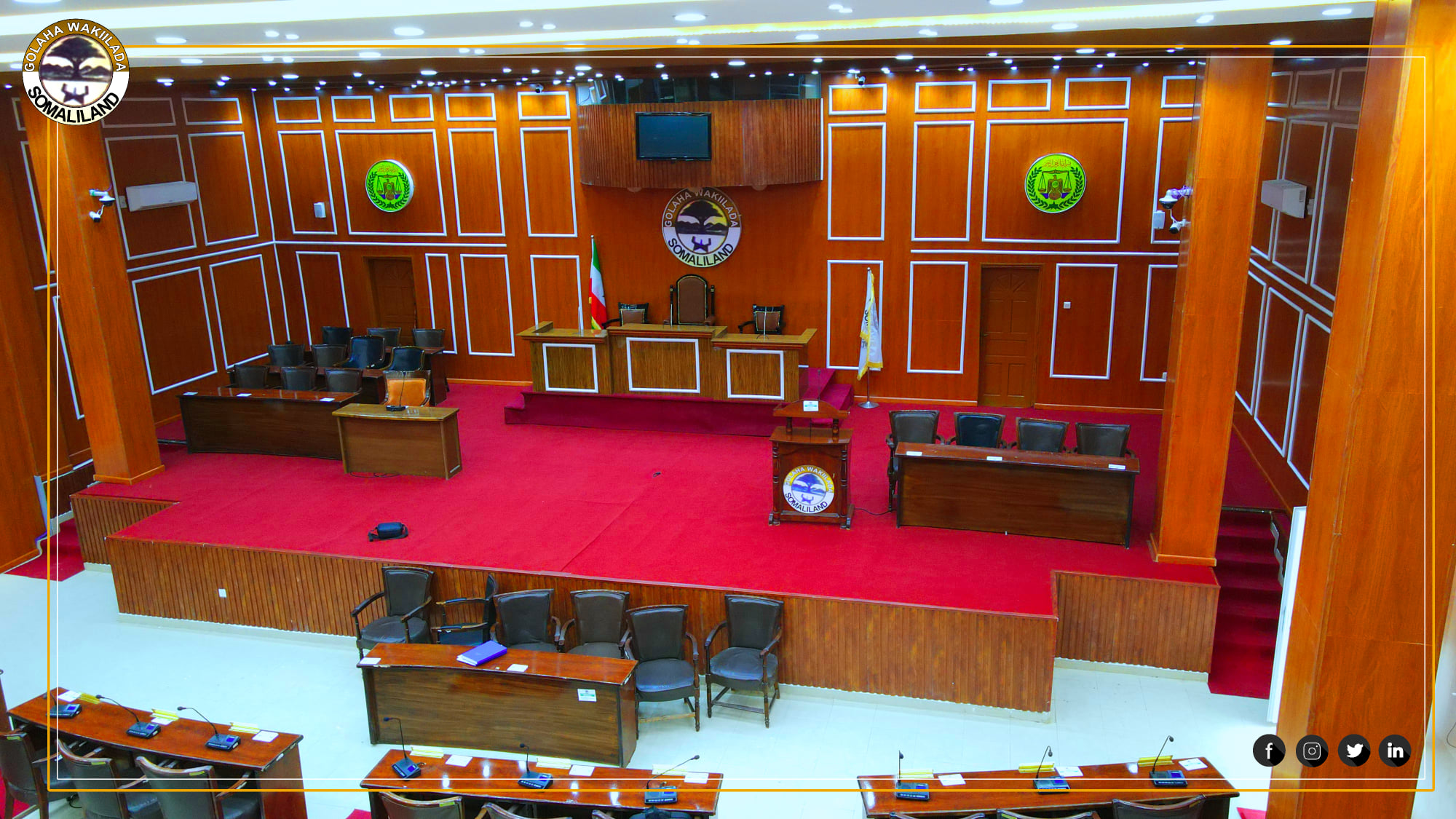
- Hargeisa

Website
- somalilandparliament.net

Footnotes
- House of Representatives on Facebook

The House of Representatives (Somali: Golaha Wakiilada, Arabic: مجلس النواب) is the lower house of the bicameral Parliament of Somaliland, with the House of Elders being the upper house.

The interim House of Representatives was formed in 1991, and driven by Somali National Movement. Somaliland National Charter of 1993 established bicameral legislature. The current House of Representatives was formed following parliamentary elections held on 29 September 2005, which resulted in a strong combined majority for the opposition Kulmiye and UCID parties. It has a total of 82 members. The latter include the Speaker of the House, Bashe Mohamed Farah. MPs are elected in six multi-member constituencies, using the party-list proportional representation system for a five-year term.

The constitution gives the House broad legislative powers over financial matters. Its most potent check on executive power is its right to approve, reject, or amend the government's annual budget and the right to inspect annual expenditure reports that the executive is obligated to prepare. The formation of the parliament in 2005 was the most important step in establishing a constitutionally-based, democratic governmental system in Somaliland.

== Electoral history ==
=== 2005 ===
| No | Region | UCID | Kulmiye | UDUB | Grand Total |
|---|---|---|---|---|---|
| 1 | Sahil | 4 | 2 | 4 | 10 |
| 2 | Awdal | 3 | 3 | 7 | 13 |
| 3 | Sanaag | 2 | 5 | 5 | 12 |
| 4 | Togdheer | 4 | 6 | 5 | 15 |
| 5 | Sool | 2 | 4 | 6 | 12 |
| 6 | Maroodi Jeex | 6 | 8 | 6 | 20 |
| Total | | 21 | 28 | 33 | 82 |

=== 2021 ===
| No | Region | UCID | Kulmiye | Waddani | Grand Total |
|---|---|---|---|---|---|
| 1 | Sahil | 3 | 4 | 3 | 10 |
| 2 | Awdal | 3 | 5 | 5 | 13 |
| 3 | Sanaag | 3 | 4 | 5 | 12 |
| 4 | Togdheer | 4 | 4 | 7 | 15 |
| 5 | Sool | 3 | 5 | 4 | 12 |
| 6 | Maroodi Jeex | 5 | 8 | 7 | 20 |
| Total | | 21 | 30 | 31 | 82 |

== Subcommittees ==
- Standing and disciplinary sub-committee
- Economic, finance and commercial sub-committee
- Social affairs and religion sub-committee
- Environment, livestock, agriculture and natural resources sub-committee
- Internal affairs, security and defence sub-committee
- Foreign policy, International relation and national planning sub-committee
- Constitutional, judiciary, justice and Human rights sub-committee
- Care and protection of public properties sub-committee

== List of Parliaments ==
- 1st Somaliland Parliament (1991–1993) – Majority party: No Party System
- 2nd Somaliland Parliament (1993–1997) – Majority party: No Party System
- 3rd Somaliland Parliament (1997–2005) – Majority party: No Party System
- 4th Somaliland Parliament (November 2005 – 2021) – Majority party: UDUB (39%), Kulmiye Party (34%)
- 5th Somaliland Parliament (June 2021–May 2026) – Majority party: Waddani (37.23%)

== Speakers ==
Political parties

Somali National Movement (SNM)
For Justice and Development (UCID)
Kulmiye Peace, Unity, and Development Party
Waddani
Independent

Symbols

^{†} Died in office

| No. | Image | Speaker | Took office | Left office | Political party | Notes |
|---|---|---|---|---|---|---|
| 1 | | Ibrahim Megag Samatar | 1991 | 1993 | SNM | |
| 2 | | Ahmed Abdi Mohamed, 'Habsade' | 1993 | 1995 | Independent | |
| 3 | | Abdirahman xusen, 'beedaani' | 1995 | 1997 | Independent | |
| 4 | | Ahmed Muhammad Aden, 'Qaybe' | 1997 | 2005 | Independent | |
| 4 | | Abdirahman Mohamed Abdullahi, 'Irro' | November 2005 | August 2017 | UCID | |
| | | Abdirahman Mohamed Abdullahi, 'Irro' | November 2005 | August 2017 | Waddani | |
| 6 | | Bashe Mohamed Farah | August 2017 | August 2021 | Kulmiye | |
| 7 | | Abdirisak Khalif Ahmed | August 2021 | June 2023 | Waddani | |
| 6 | | Yasin Haji Mohamoud 'Faratoon' | July 2023 | Incumbent | Kulmiye | |

== Gallery ==
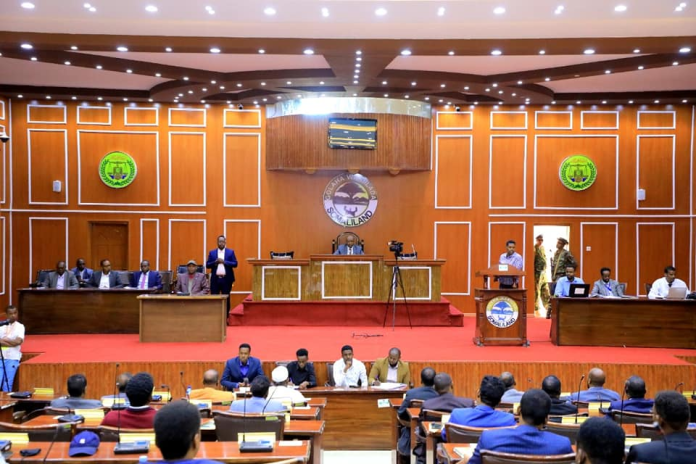
Speaker's chair

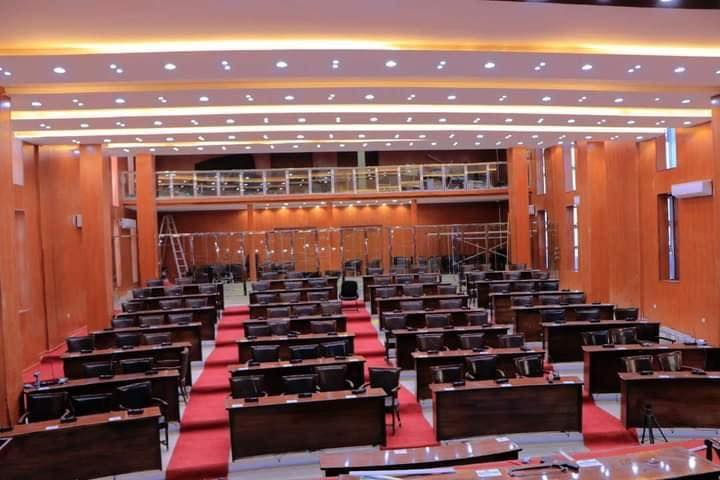
The chamber of the House of Representatives

== See also ==
- History of Somaliland
- Legislative branch
- List of national legislatures
