= 2010 Somaliland presidential election =

- 26 June 2010
- Turnout: 50.31%
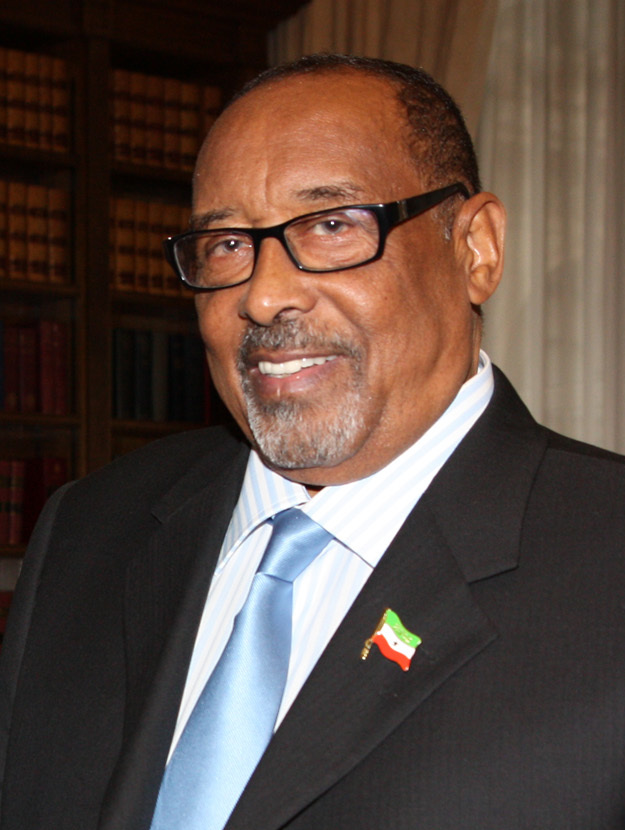

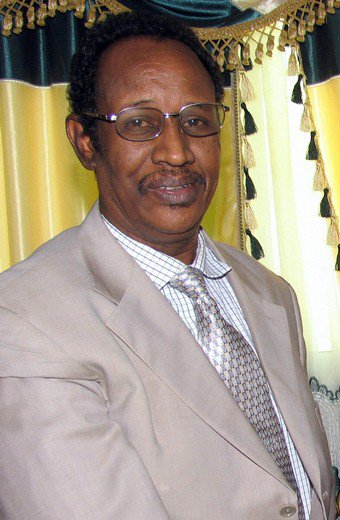

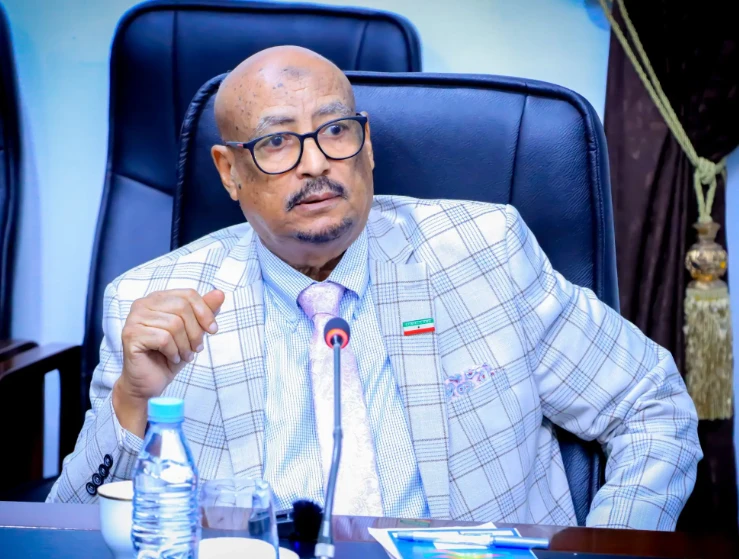
Nominee	Ahmed Mohamed Silanyo	Dahir Riyale Kahin	Faysal Ali Warabe
Party	Kulmiye	UDUB	UCID
Running mate	Abdirahman Saylici	Ahmed Yusuf Yasin	Mohammad Rashid
Popular vote	266,906	178,881	92,459
Percentage	49.59%	33.23%	17.18%
President before election
Dahir Riyale Kahin
UDUB
Elected President
Ahmed Mohamed Silanyo
Kulmiye

Presidential elections were held in Somaliland on 26 June 2010. The elections were originally scheduled for August 2008 and numerous delays, endangered political stability in the country. On 1 July 2010, the Somaliland National Election Commission announced that opposition candidate Ahmed Mohamed Mohamoud had won the elections, defeating incumbent President Dahir Riyale Kahin.

== Background ==
The elections were originally scheduled for 31 August 2008, but the instability in the eastern Sanaag and Sool regions led the Guurti to extend the incumbent's term for a year in early April 2008, setting the election for 15 March 2009. This was heavily criticised by the opposition—in the end, a compromise led to the date of 6 April 2009, which was later changed to one week before that (29 March). On 3 March, it was announced that the elections were postponed by two more months, to be held on 31 May.

On 6 September 2009, the electoral commission announced that the election could not be held on the day planned, 27 September, due to "current political, economic and technical conditions". A new date was not announced. President Dahir Riyale Kahin subsequently asked the Guurti for yet another term extension since it would expire on 29 September, but was denied this. On 28 September however, it was reported that on a second vote, the term extension was granted, provided that the government adheres to a six-point proposal to organise the next elections.

Somaliland politicians then expected the election to be held in January 2010 at the earliest. Later, April 2010 was mentioned, but it soon became clear this date would also be missed. The elections were then expected for June 2010, as the preparations for the elections were underway. The first ballot boxes for the election arrived from Denmark on 19 April, and new voter registration cards will be issued from the second week of May. Somaliland's electoral commission backed a June election on 28 April 2010, stating the voters list had been updated and now contains 1.1 million people.

== Conduct ==
After a two-year delay, voting for the presidential elections finally took place in late June 2010. A team of international observers led by Progressio, a UK-based development agency (formerly known as the Catholic Institute for International Relations) that has long been an advocate for independence movements, described the process as "free and fair", although they noted violence in the disputed eastern Sool region that led to the death of an election official.

The International Republican Institute asserted that "Somaliland’s election was peaceful, without major incident and generally met international standards. Hundreds of thousands of Somalilanders turned out to vote in their fourth election, and although wanting international recognition, did not wait to continue to build their nascent democracy. The international community should credit such democratic progress and the example it sets for others."

== Results ==
The Somaliland National Election Commission announced the results on 1 July 2010, the fiftieth anniversary of independence from Britain. They showed that Ahmed M. Mahamoud Silanyo had won the presidential election with just under 50% of the vote, defeating incumbent president Dahir Riyale Kahin, who received 33%.

Candidate	Running mate	Party	Votes	%
Ahmed Mahamoud Silanyo	Abdirahman Saylici	Peace, Unity, and Development Party	266,906	49.59
Dahir Riyale Kahin	Ahmed Yusuf Yasin	United Peoples' Democratic Party	178,881	33.23
Faysal Ali Warabe	Mohammad Rashid	For Justice and Development	92,459	17.18
Total			538,246	100.00
Total votes			538,246	–
Registered voters/turnout			1,069,914	50.31
Source: NEC, African Elections Database

=== By district ===
Legend
Kulmiye victory	UDUB victory

#	Region	District	KULMIYE		UDUB		UCID		Total votes		Margin	
#	Region	District	Votes	%	Votes	%	Votes	%	Votes	%	Votes	%
1	Awdal	Saylac	3,209	42.0%	4,256	55.6%	184	2.4%	7,649	1.4%	-1,047	-13.7%
2	Awdal	Lughaya	2,074	48.3%	2,080	48.4%	143	3.3%	4,297	0.8%	-6	-0.1%
3	Awdal	Boorame	9,218	16.4%	44,443	79.0%	2,584	4.6%	56,245	10.4%	-35,225	-62.6%
4	Awdal	Baki	3,951	30.1%	8,826	67.1%	370	2.8%	13,147	2.4%	-4,875	-37.1%
5	Maroodi Jeex	Gabiley	38,305	72.3%	12,841	24.2%	1,858	3.5%	53,004	9.8%	25,464	48.0%
6	Maroodi Jeex	Hargeysa	73,884	44.7%	40,919	24.7%	50,616	30.6%	165,419	30.7%	32,965	19.9%
7	Maroodi Jeex	Bali Gubadle	4,984	66.4%	1,813	24.2%	709	9.4%	7,506	1.4%	3,171	42.2%
8	Maroodi Jeex	Sallaxley	999	8.9%	423	3.8%	9,800	87.3%	11,222	2.1%	576	5.1%
9	Saaxil	Berbera	8,115	38.3%	11,046	52.1%	2,048	9.7%	21,209	3.9%	-2,931	-13.8%
10	Saaxil	Sheekh	2,433	30.4%	4,507	56.3%	1,062	13.3%	8,002	1.5%	-2,074	-25.9%
11	Togdheer	Burco	63,554	71.1%	16,824	18.8%	8,999	10.1%	89,377	16.6%	46,730	52.3%
12	Togdheer	Oodweyne	4,940	33.9%	4,480	30.8%	5,146	35.3%	14,566	2.7%	460	3.2%
13	Togdheer	Buuhoodle	7,252	94.1%	309	4.0%	149	1.9%	7,710	1.4%	6,943	90.1%
14	Sool	Caynabo	13,509	80.6%	2,317	13.8%	933	5.6%	16,759	3.1%	11,192	66.8%
15	Sool	Laascaanood	1,848	44.9%	1,717	41.7%	554	13.4%	4,119	0.8%	131	3.2%
16	Sool	Xudun	0	0.0%	0	0.0%	0	0.0%	0	0.0%	0	0.0%
17	Sanaag	Gar'adag	4,131	81.8%	735	14.5%	186	3.7%	5,052	0.9%	3,396	67.2%
18	Sanaag	Ceel Afweyn	9,313	66.3%	2,762	19.7%	1,971	14.0%	14,046	2.6%	6,551	46.6%
19	Sanaag	Ceerigaabo	15,061	39.5%	18,849	49.5%	4,182	11.0%	38,092	7.1%	-3,788	-9.9%
20	Sanaag	Badhan	126	6.9%	734	40.2%	965	52.9%	1,825	0.3%	-608	-33.3%
21	Sanaag	Dhahar	0	0.0%	0	0.0%	0	0.0%	0	0.0%	0	0.0%
Total			266,906	49.5%	179,881	33.4%	92,459	17.15%	538,246	100%	-87,025	-16.14%
Source: NEC

== Aftermath ==
After the results were announced, Kahin congratulated Silanyo and reiterated that he would step down. Silanyo was sworn in on 27 July at a ceremony.
