= Kulmiye Peace, Unity, and Development Party =

Political party in Somaliland

Kulmiye Peace, Unity, and Development Party Xisbiga Kulmiye Nabad, Midnimo iyo Horumarka
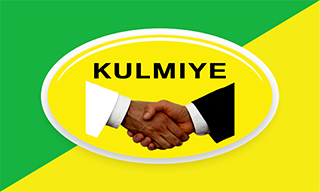
- Chairman: Mohamed Kahin Ahmed
- Speaker of the House: Yasin Haji Mohamoud
- Founder: Ahmed Mohamed Silanyo
- Founded: May 12, 2002; 24 years ago
- Headquarters: Hargeisa
- Ideology: Social liberalism; Moderate progressivism; Islamic democracy
- Political position: Centre to centre-left
- Regional affiliation: Africa Liberal Network (observer)
- Colors: Green Yellow
- House of Representatives: 30 / 82
- Local councillors: 93 / 220

Party flag

Website
- www.kulmiyeparty.org

The Kulmiye Peace, Unity and Development Party (Somali: Xisbiga Kulmiye Nabad, Midnimo iyo Horumarka; Arabic: حزب التضامن), also known as simply Kulmiye (lit. 'Solidarity'), is a political party in Somaliland. The party was founded by Ahmed Mohamed Mohamoud "Silanyo" in May 2002, ahead of the first municipal elections later that year. The party is mainly supported by people from the Habr Je'lo, Habr Awal and Darod clans.

In the presidential elections of 14 April 2003, its candidate Ahmed Mohamed Mohamoud "Silanyo" won 42.1% of the popular vote. He was narrowly defeated by Dahir Riyale Kahin.

In parliamentary elections held on 29 September 2005, the party won 34.1% of the vote and 28 out of 82 seats.

In the 2010 presidential election, Silanyo and his running mate Abdirahman Saylici claimed victory and comfortably defeated Kahin.

In the 2017 presidential election, President Silanyo chose not to seek a second term in office. Muse Bihi Abdi, who became party Chairman in 2015 and his running mate, incumbent Vice President Abdirahman Saylici won with 55% of the vote.

== Party chairmen ==
Picture	Name	Term start	Term end	Date of birth	Notes
	Ahmed Mohamed Mohamoud "Silanyo" أحمد محمد محمود سيلانيو	12 May 2002	31 December 2010	1936	4th President of Somaliland; 27 July 2010 – 13 December 2017; Minister of Finance; 1997 – 1999
	Muse Bihi Abdi موسى بيحي عبدي	31 December 2010	21 August 2023	2 January 1948	5th President of Somaliland; 13 December 2017 – 12 December 2024; Minister of Interior; 1993 – 1995
	Mohamed Kahin Ahmed محمد كاهن أحمد	21 August 2023	Present	1 July 1953	Minister of Interior; 14 December 2017 – 14 December 2024

== Kulmiye presidents of Somaliland ==
#	Name (lifespan)	Portrait	Presidency start date	Presidency end date	Time in office
4	Ahmed Mohamed Mohamoud "Silanyo" أحمد محمد محمود سيلانيو (1936-2024)		27 July 2010	13 December 2017	7 years, 139 days
5	Muse Bihi Abdi موسى بيحي عبدي (born 1948)		13 December 2017	12 December 2024	8 years, 344 days

== Election results ==
=== Presidential elections ===
Election	Party candidate	Votes	%	Result
2003	Ahmed Mohamed Mohamoud "Silanyo"	205,515	42.07%	Lost ✗
2010	Ahmed Mohamed Mohamoud "Silanyo"	266,906	49.59%	Elected ✓
2017	Muse Bihi Abdi	305,909	55.1%	Elected ✓
2024	Muse Bihi Abdi	225,219	34.81%	Lost ✗

=== Parliamentary elections ===
Election	Votes	%	Seats	+/–	Position
2005	228,328	34.06%	28 / 82	New	▲2nd
2021	257,020	36.92%	30 / 82	▲2	2nd
2027	TBD	TBD	TBD		

=== Local elections ===
Election	Votes	%	Seats	+/–	Position
2002	83,158	18.90%	71 / 379	▲71	▲2nd
2012	244,795	30.19%	99 / 323	▲28	▲1st
2021	268,815	39%	93 / 220	▼6	1st
2027	TBD	TBD	TBD	TBD	TBD

== See also ==
- United Peoples' Democratic Party
- For Justice and Development
- Waddani
