= Vice President of Somaliland =

Deputy head of state of Somaliland

Vice President of the Republic of Somaliland
- Madaxweyne Ku Xigeenka Jamhuuriyadda Soomaaliland نائب رئيس جمهورية أرض الصومال
- National Emblem of Somaliland

- Flag of Somaliland

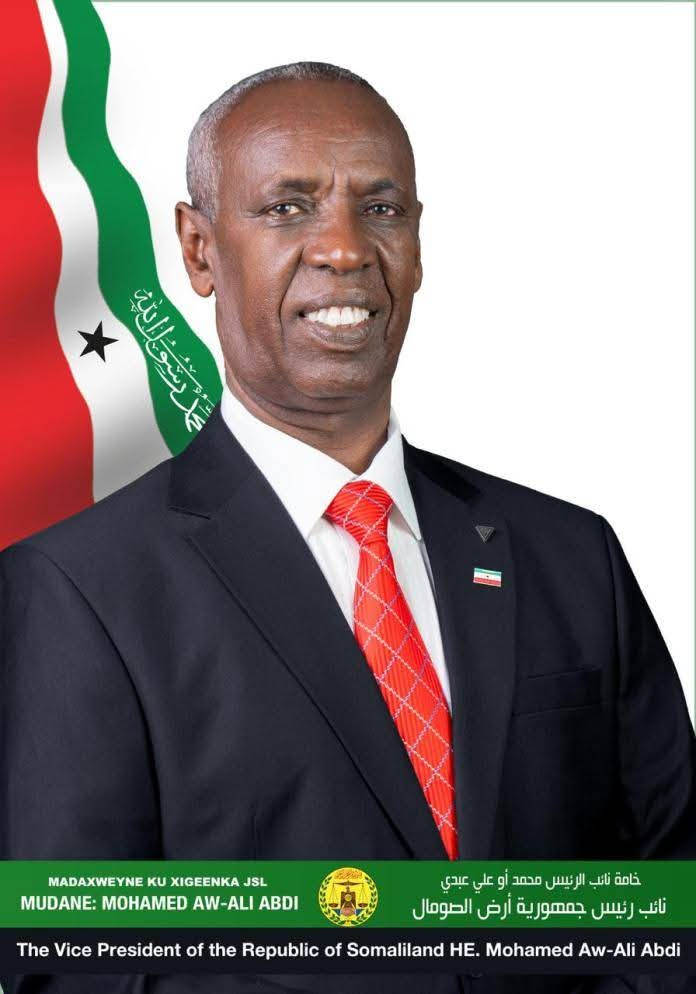
- Incumbent; Mohamed Aw-Ali Abdi since 13 December 2024
- Style: His Excellency; Mr. Vice President
- Member of: Cabinet of Somaliland
- Seat: Hargeisa (1991–present)
- Appointer: Direct election President of Somaliland
- Term length: 5 years, renewable once
- Constituting instrument: Constitution of the Republic of Somaliland
- Formation: 28 May 1991
- First holder: Hassan Isse Jama
- Website: madaxtooyadajsl.com/category/english-news/ (in English)

The vice president of Somaliland (Somali: Madaxweyne ku xigeenka Somaliland) is the deputy head of state of Somaliland and the second highest official next to the president. The vice president is the constitutional successor of the president of Somaliland in case of a vacancy.

== List of vice presidents of Somaliland ==
Political parties

Somali National Movement (SNM)
United Peoples' Democratic Party (UDUB)
Kulmiye Peace, Unity, and Development Party
Waddani
Independent

Symbols

^{†} Died in office

No.	Portrait	Office Holder	Elected	Term of office			Political party	Notes
No.	Portrait	Office Holder	Elected	Took office	Left office	Time in office	Political party	Notes
1		Hassan Isse Jama	Selected	7 June 1991	16 May 1993	1 year, 343 days	SNM	
2		Abdirahman Aw Ali Farrah 'Tolwaa' عبدالرحمن أو علي فارح	Selected	16 May 1993	16 February 1997	3 years, 276 days	Independent	
3		Dahir Riyale Kahin ظاهر ريالي كاهن	Selected	16 February 1997	3 May 2002	5 years, 76 days	Independent	
		Dahir Riyale Kahin ظاهر ريالي كاهن	Selected	16 February 1997	3 May 2002	5 years, 76 days	UDUB	Succeeded as President of Somaliland
4		Ahmed Yusuf Yasin أحمد يوسف ياسين	Selected; 2003	3 May 2002	27 July 2010	8 years, 85 days	UDUB	
5		Abdirahman Saylici عبد الرحمن زيلعي	2010; 2017	27 July 2010	13 December 2024	14 years, 139 days	Kulmiye	
6		Mohamed Aw-Ali Abdi	2024	13 December 2024	Incumbent	1 year, 269 days	Waddani	

== See also ==
- Somaliland
  - Politics of Somaliland
  - President of Somaliland
- Lists of office-holders
