= 2003 Somaliland presidential election =

- 14 April 2003
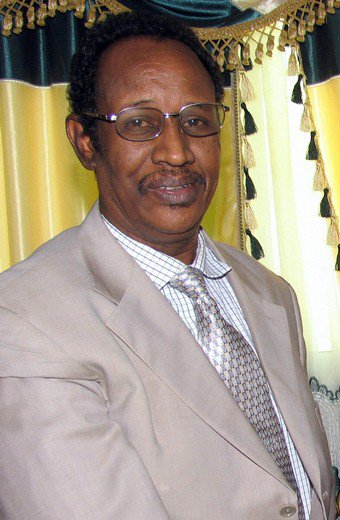

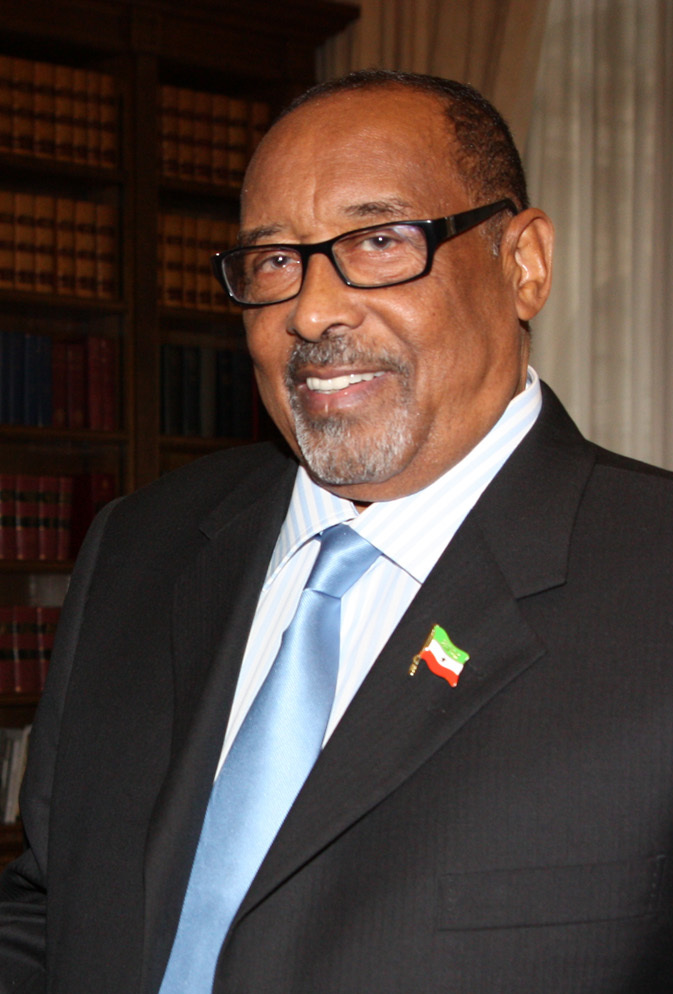

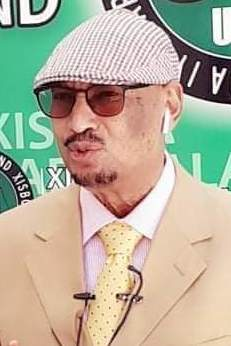
Nominee	Dahir Riyale; Kahin	Ahmed Mohamed Mohamoud	Faysal Ali Warabe
Party	UDUB	Kulmiye	UCID
Running mate	Ahmed Yusuf Yasin	Abdirahman Saylici	Mohammad Rashid
Popular vote	205,595	205,515	77,433
Percentage	42.08%	42.07%	15.85%
- Results by region
President before election
Dahir Riyale Kahin
UDUB
Elected President
Dahir Riyale Kahin
UDUB

Presidential elections were held in Somaliland on 14 April 2003. The result was a victory for incumbent President Dahir Riyale Kahin, who won by a margin of just 0.01%. The outcome was initially rejected by the main opposition, which led to violence and a subsequent ban on public protests for a ten-day period starting on 22 April. Nevertheless, the International Crisis Group labeled the election a democratic "milestone" for the breakaway state. On 11 May the Somaliland Supreme Court endorsed Kahin's victory. He was sworn in on 16 May.

== Background ==
Having come into existence in 1991, in the early 2000s the unrecognised Republic of Somaliland began to transition from a state-run, tribal government to a democratic nation. The country was mostly made up of three clan families — the Isaaq (the largest), the Dir (which includes the Gadabuursi clan), and the Darod. The elections were seen as a crucial part of the transition from a clan based power sharing system to a constitutional government based in multi-party democracy.

=== District elections ===
The district council elections in December 2002 not only served to elect the local council members, but also determined which three political associations would gain enough popular support to be able to nominate presidential candidates. The elections also acted as a test for the newly founded Somaliland Electoral Commission (SEC). The SEC had been established in December 2001 through a series of Electoral Laws composed of 66 articles, setting the rules, regulations, and expected conduct for democratic elections moving forward. To help the SEC with the elections, the European Commission sent technical consultants, funded voter education and trained election workers and NGOs to assist with the local elections, despite Somaliland's lack of international recognition.

The district council elections were largely considered a success, despite some problems. Authorities in Puntland, another autonomous region of Somalia that disputes some territorial boundaries with Somaliland, threatened the election. Because of security concerns, 74 polling stations out of 800 were closed In Eastern Saang and Sool. Most of the problems in the election could be attributed to the newly founded SEC, rather than security concerns. Though reports of double voting and ballot stuffing were present and there were problems due to an undereducated and mostly illiterate voting population, international observers from Denmark, Sweden, Kenya, South Africa and Britain confirmed that the elections were well conducted and successful, noting the high turnout of female voters and the organization of the electoral officials.

The United Peoples' Democratic Party (UDUB) gained 40.8% of the overall vote in the district elections, followed by The Peace Unity and Development Party (Kulmiye) which gained 18.9%, and The Justice and Welfare Party (UCID) which gained 11.2%. Members elected outside of these political parties were forced to change political affiliation. Sool (where many polling stations closed for security concerns) was the only one of the six regions in Somaliland where UDUB did not win a plurality of the vote. UDUB's success can be attributed to its incumbency, superior financial resources and its advantageous clan ties. It was also considered the more conservative, stable choice.

=== Election preparations ===
Learning from the previous experience in the district elections, the number of polling places increased from 800 to 900 for the presidential elections. The SEC improved and increased training for staff and party agents and cross-assigned election officers to ensure electoral officials were not presiding over their own communities where they could be influenced by their clans. Since a huge portion of the population was still nomadic and illiterate, voter education was crucial. The SEC organized acting groups that traveled around with loudspeakers mounted on cars informing people about the upcoming elections and voting procedures. On election day polling stations had posters with written and illustrative information about the candidates and voter protocol.

The British Government had been more likely than other foreign powers to subtly treat Somaliland as an independent state. However, fearing that its assistance in the presidential election would be construed as support for Somaliland's international recognition, the European Commission did not assist the SEC, as it had in the local district elections.

== Candidates ==
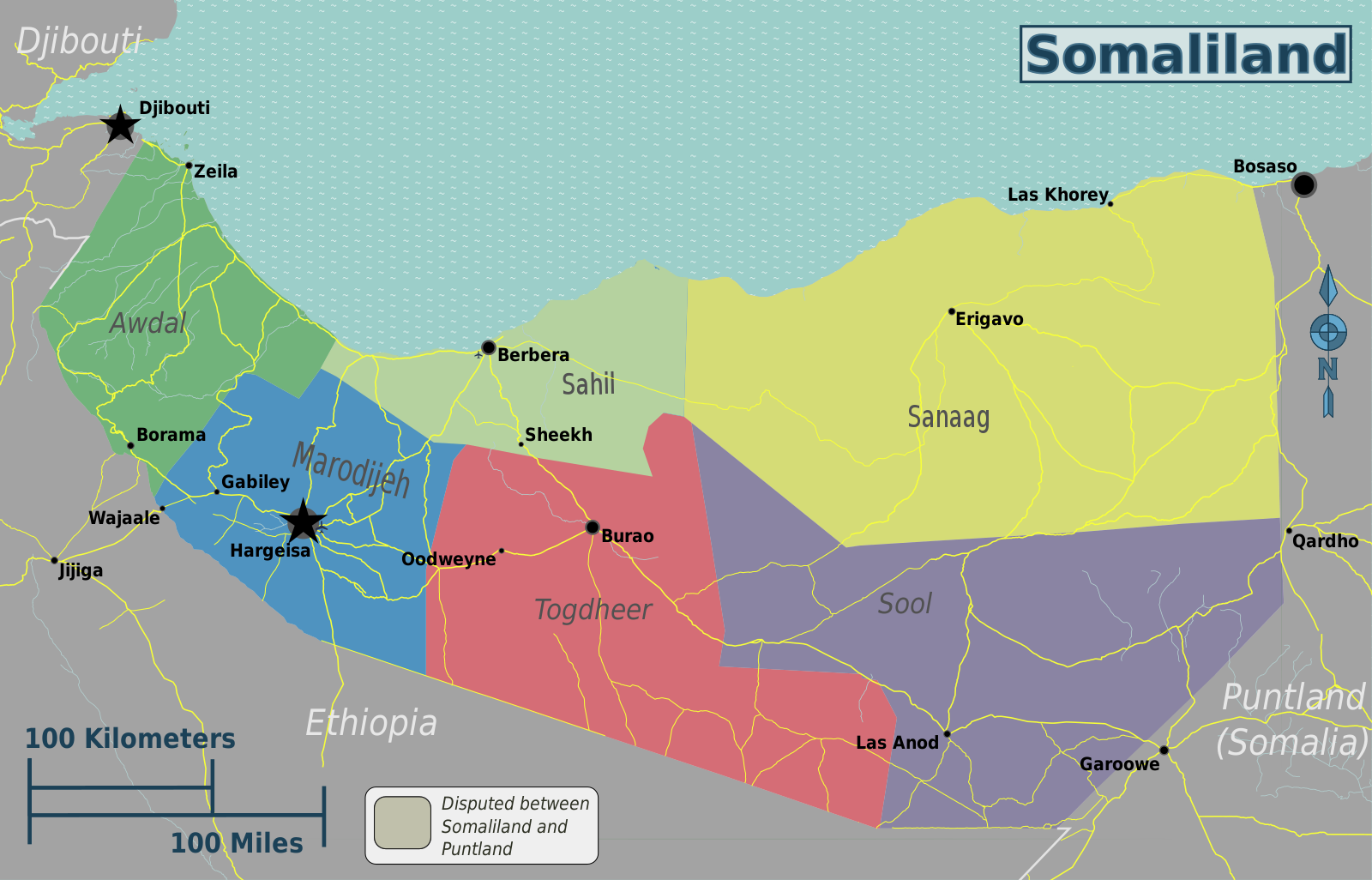
Regions of Somaliland including the disputed regions of Eastern Saang and Sool.

Three candidates ran for president. Dahir Riyale Kahin was the incumbent President from UDUB, who become president after the unexpected death of Somaliland's first President, Egal. His peaceful takeover was a major success for Somaliland because Kahin was not a member of the majority Isaaq Clan, but the Gadabursi Clan. The acceptance of a non-Isaaq ruler was a sign of political maturity and improved Somaliland's status abroad.

Riyale's Main opposition was Ahmed Mohamed Mohamoud Silanyo (Kulmiye). Silanyo was a former chairman of the Somali National Movement Liberation Struggle (SNM). Faysal Ali Waraabe ran as the UCID candidate. UCID had narrower base of support meaning the election was essentially between Kahin and Silanyo.

== Campaign ==
The candidates all shared similar campaign platforms. Firstly, independence and international recognition for Somaliland. The majority of the people of Somaliland have developed a sense of identity distinct from the rest of Somalis based on their different clans ties and their different colonial History. The rest of the platform promised economic growth, peace and stability. UDUB's campaign slogan simplified this to "Peace and Milk."

UDUB, because of its incumbency was the government party and benefited from government resources sometimes unfairly. UDUB campaign propaganda equated UDUB with peace, continuity and stability and Kulmiye with war. UDUB, despite its incumbency and stability, was painted by Kulmiye as holdovers from the former Barre Government in Somalia—a military regime that ruled Somalia for 20 years till the rise of the SNM in the late 1980s. Kulmiye propaganda equated Kulmiye with liberation and change and UDUB with oppression. They also promised a "cleaner and leaner" administration and more participation for women.

UDUB used public funds and assets, including the use of ministry staff, the government radio, and government vehicles to get out the vote in UDUB areas. All three of the parties handed out cash to manipulate the process. But because bribes went through the ministries, it almost never reached the voters making it highly unlikely this influenced election. All of this was in direct violation of the electoral conduct laws.

== Conduct ==
Voting occurred as planned on 14 April 2003. Voting was reportedly orderly and well mannered. The election was considered a success and International observers confirmed that the election was free and fair, despite some the predictable problems of a first-time presidential election. Although the problems from the district elections like illiteracy, ballot stuffing, and double voting were still present, more controls were put in place. Some of the controls may be responsible for the lower voter turnout in some regions.

International observers from countries including the U.S., Canada, Sweden, the U.K., Ethiopia, and South Africa came to observe the election mostly as members of NGOs. The Observers gave favorable reports but noted some variation in the management of different polling stations and a lack of voter age restriction enforcement. The elections were described as "among the freest and most transparent democratic exercises ever staged in the Horn of Africa." The elections served as a signal to the international community that Somaliland should be respected and acknowledged and were a point of pride for the men and women of Somaliland. Despite the success of its democratic elections, Somaliland has not yet received international recognition.

118 polling stations were closed in the same regions (East Saang and Sool) and for the same reasons as in the district elections. The most major electoral issue occurred in the Sool region where a conflict caused the death of an election official.

== Results ==
Voter turnout was lower than expected and only increased 10% from the district elections.

On 18 April 2002 the SEC announced that the results would be announced the following day. Most people, supporters and opposition alike, believed that Kulmiye had won the election. Silanyo even declared victory and the Somaliland Times reported that he had won. However, the celebration for Kulmiye supporters was short lived. On April 19, the SEC announced that UDUB had won by just 80 votes. Kulmiye supporters and party officials were furious and believed that the election was rigged. Small protests erupted in areas that were Kulmiye strongholds and the government invoked emergency laws. The human rights organization, African Rights, wrote a report that strongly criticized the government reaction and the police intimidation and violence used against Kulmiye supporters. While party activists and the political elite were agitated, the general public remained calm. Four days later Kulmiye challenged the result and their complaint was taken to the Supreme Court.

Candidate	Running mate	Party	Votes	%
Dahir Riyale Kahin	Ahmed Yusuf Yasin	United Peoples' Democratic Party	205,595	42.08
Ahmed M. Mahamoud Silanyo	Abdirahman Saylici	Peace, Unity, and Development Party	205,515	42.07
Faysal Ali Warabe	Mohammad Rashid	For Justice and Development	77,433	15.85
Total			488,543	100.00
Valid votes			488,543	97.98
Invalid/blank votes			10,096	2.02
Total votes			498,639	100.00
Source: African Elections Database

== Aftermath ==
Anticipating Kulmiye's complaint to the Supreme Court, UDUB alleged that the SEC had improperly annulled ballots despite initially agreeing with the SEC's decision to disqualify ballots on procedural grounds. The SEC called UDUB's complaint "baseless."

Kulmiye on the other hand, while first alleging mistabulation on the part of the SEC, instead alleged that a specific ballot box from the pro-Kulmiye region of Balle Alanle had been improperly omitted from the vote count. The box had been mishandled after a security incident involving UDUB supporters attempting to tamper with the vote. It had been taken to Bur'o and the SEC had been unable to trace it until after the announcement of the preliminary results. The SEC left it up to the court to decide the validity of the votes in the box. The box held about 700 votes the majority of which could be assumed votes for Silanyo. The Supreme Court refused to open the box and announced on May 11 that Kahin had won by a margin of 214 rather than 80 votes. No further explanation was given.

Kulmiye's chairman challenged the Court because of the change in the result and the lack of explanation. Kulmiye claimed the court was incompetent, a common complaint about the Somaliland Judiciary, and lacked impartiality. Kulmiye refused to recognize UDUB and Kulmiye and UCID officials were absent from Kahin's swearing in on May 16. Silyano appealed to his supporters to remain calm but despite reports of some intimidation and mistreatment of Kulmiye supporters, most of the public was largely uninvolved and unmoved. There were no mass rallies or protests. The public largely considered the problems following the election a matter for politicians.

Despite the urging of his supporters, Silyano refused to form an opposing government and, on 8 June 2003, Kulmiye conceded the election and abided by the courts decision "despite strong grievances of injustice in the election," ensuring a successful first democratic presidential election in Somaliland.

The dramatic events of the presidential election meant the 2005 parliamentary elections were even more important. Until the 2005 parliamentary elections, the UDUB government would function as a de facto one party state.
