= Abdirahman Mohamed Abdullahi =

President of Somaliland since 2024

His Excellency Abdirahman Mohamed Abdullahi
- Cabdiraxmaan Maxamed Cabdillaahi
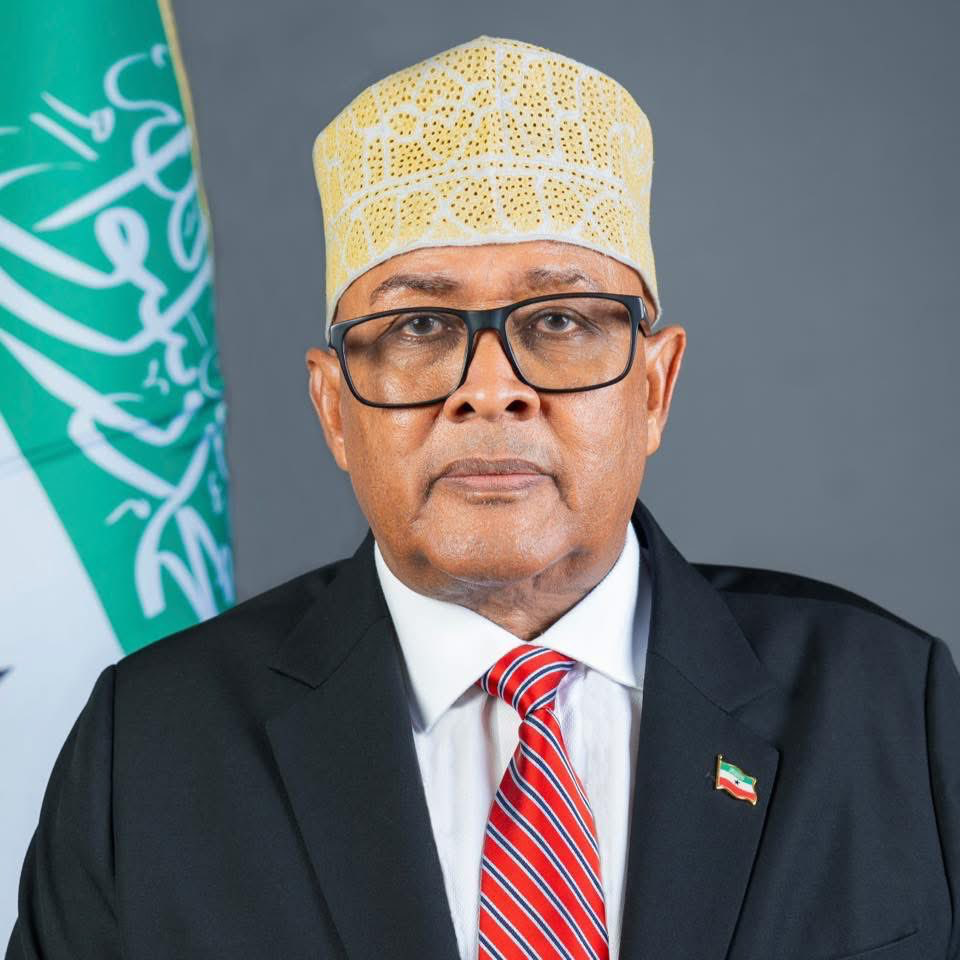
- Official portrait, 2024

6th President of Somaliland
- Incumbent
- Assumed office 13 December 2024
- Vice President: Mohamed Aw-Ali Abdi
- Preceded by: Muse Bihi Abdi

4th Speaker of the Somaliland House of Representatives
- In office November 2005 – 2 August 2017
- Preceded by: Ahmed Mohamed Adan
- Succeeded by: Bashe Mohamed Farah

Chairman of Waddani
- In office October 2012 – 16 November 2021
- Preceded by: Position established
- Succeeded by: Hersi Ali Haji Hassan

Personal details
- Born: 24 April 1956 (age 70) Hargeisa, British Somaliland (present-day Somaliland) (Note: Claimed by Somaliland, which is only recognised by Israel)
- Citizenship: Somaliland; Finland
- Party: Waddani (since 2012)
- Other political affiliations: Justice and Welfare Party (until 2010)
- Education: SOS Sheikh Secondary School; American University (MBA)

Abdirahman Mohamed Abdullahi (Note: Somali: Cabdiraxmaan Maxamed Cabdillaahi, pronounced [ʕabdiraħmaːn maħamed ʕabdilːaːhi].) (born 24 April 1956), colloquially known as Irro, (Note: Somali: Cirro, pronounced [ʕirːo].) is a Somalilander politician and diplomat who has served as the incumbent and sixth President of Somaliland since 12 December 2024.

Abdirahman served as speaker of the Somaliland House of Representatives during most of the first elected parliament. He was announced as the presidential nominee in the 2024 Somaliland presidential election for the Waddani Party. He won the election and took office that year.

During his term, Israel became the first country to recognize Somaliland.

== Career ==
=== Early career ===
Professionally, Abdirahman worked at the Settlement Development Agency (Dan-wadaagaha) in different parts of Somalia. From 1981, he took on a position in the foreign service of the Somali Democratic Republic. Abdirahman also served in the Somali Embassy as the first consular in Moscow, which covered the entire Soviet Union. In 1991, he was re-appointed as Somalia's acting Ambassador to the Soviet Union. In this capacity, Abdirahman assisted the many Somali expatriates who had left Somalia following outbreak of the civil war. He later relocated to Finland in 1995 to join his family, who had moved there a few years prior, and subsequently received Finnish citizenship.

=== UCID Party ===
In 2005, Abdirahman was elected in the 2005 Somaliland parliamentary election to represent the Justice and Welfare Party (UCID) in Sahil.

The UCID political party was the first opposition party formally formed in Somaliland after the ruling United Peoples' Democratic Party (UDUB), while other politicians generally focused their opposition against the region's incumbent Egal administration (AHN). UCID also supported the referendum which put the foundation for the multi-party system, a process which many politicians have opposed and saw favouring Egal (AHN).

=== 2005 Somaliland parliamentary election ===
Somaliland held elections to an 82-member House of Representatives on 29 September 2005. It was the first multi-party parliamentary election conducted in Somaliland since 1991, when the civil war began.

=== 2017 Somaliland presidential election ===
The 2017 Somaliland presidential election was the third direct presidential election since 2003, held nominally on 13 November 2017. The result was a victory for ruling Kulmiye party candidate Muse Bihi Abdi, who received 55% of the vote. Abdirahman received 41% of the vote.

=== 2024 Somaliland presidential election ===
Abdirahman was elected President of Somaliland in the 2024 Somaliland presidential election as the candidate of the Waddani Party. He won nearly 64% of the vote, while incumbent president Muse Bihi Abdi received 35%. He was inaugurated on 12 December 2024.

== Presidency (2024–present) ==
=== Foreign policy ===
During his term, Israel became the first country to recognize Somaliland. Abdirahman stated that Somaliland would join the Abraham Accords. In January 2026, he hosted Israeli foreign minister Gideon Sa'ar during the latter's visit to Somaliland. Following Israel's recognition, Abdirahman continued to host high-level meetings with Israeli officials and people closely related to the U.S. government. At the 56th World Economic Forum in Davos in January 2026, Abdirahman met with Israeli President Isaac Herzog and Eric Trump, with Herzog posting on X (formerly) Twitter that he was pleased about Israel's recognition of Somaliland and that he had discussed ways to deepen cooperation between both countries.

An adviser to Abdirahman stated that Trump expressed interest in Somaliland and "the opportunities it offers", with Somaliland reportedly expressing its openness to investment, such as in the port of Berbera and its potential as a "logistical hub for trade and energy infrastructure." After Israel's recognition, various scholars and politicians in Ethiopia urged the Ethiopian government to recognize Somaliland, which they said it is considering to do, further stating that it is in the best of interest of Ethiopia's ambitions to a sea exit to the Red Sea.

Other international positions from Abdirahman since assuming the presidency and recognition from Israel have been in consistent support for the U.S. foreign policies, including the 2026 United States intervention in Venezuela and the capture of president Nicolás Maduro.

Abdirahman also rejected allegations of resettlement of Palestinians from the Gaza Strip in Somaliland, accusing Somali President Hassan Sheikh Mohamud of attempting to undermine Somaliland's relationship with Israel, also denying that Israel had requested permission to open a military base in Somaliland in exchange for recognition, which Abdirahman said was untrue. In February 2025, Abdirahman had rejected a similar allegation that the U.S. had requested Somaliland to accept Palestinian refugees as part of the Trump Gaza Strip takeover proposal.

Abdirahman stated after Israel's recognition that Somaliland does not want war, but that it is ready to defend itself from Somalia and its allies following threats from the Somali government and groups like the Houthis, whose leader, Abdul-Malik al-Houthi, assured that the Houthis would attack Israeli bases in Somaliland. He also said that he sent personal letters to the leaders of Turkey, Egypt, and Saudi Arabia, urging them to recognize Somaliland.

=== Social issues ===
Somaliland exercises a strict interpretation of law, with a swift application of punishments like execution for different crimes, including murder. In one of these examples, Abdirahman signed the death warrants of two men who killed two soldiers in separate incidents in Hargeisa and Gabiley. After a conviction by a military court and request of the victims' families to execute the killers, Abdirahman ordered the execution by firing squad at the Madheera Central Prison.

== Notes ==
Political offices
Preceded by Ahmed Muhammad Aden	Speaker of the Somaliland House of Representatives; 2005–2017	Succeeded by Bashe Mohamed Farah
Preceded by Muse Bihi Abdi	President of Somaliland; 2024–present	Incumbent
