= Dahir Riyale Kahin =

3rd president of Somaliland (2002–2010)

- ظاهر ريالي كاهن
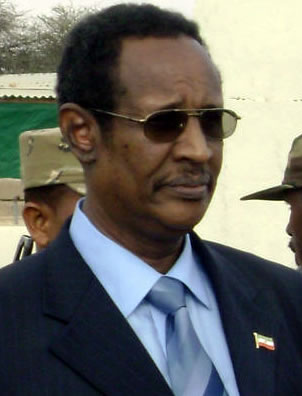
- Kahin in 2009

3rd President of Somaliland
- In office 3 May 2002 – 27 July 2010
- Vice President: Ahmed Yusuf Yasin
- Preceded by: Muhammad Haji Ibrahim Egal
- Succeeded by: Ahmed Mohamed Mohamoud

3rd Vice President of Somaliland
- In office 16 May 1997 – 3 May 2002
- President: Muhammad Haji Ibrahim Egal
- Preceded by: Abdirahman Aw Ali Farrah
- Succeeded by: Ahmed Yusuf Yasin

Personal details
- Born: 12 March 1952 (age 74) Quljeed, British Somaliland
- Citizenship: Somalilander
- Party: United Peoples' Democratic Party
- Spouse: Huda Barkhad

Dahir Riyale Kahin (Somali: Daahir Riyaale Kaahin, Arabic: ظاهر ريالي كاهن; born 12 March 1952) is a Somaliland politician who was the President of Somaliland from 2002 to 2010. He previously served as the Vice President of Somaliland from 1997 to 2002.

== Personal life ==
Kahin was born in the town of Quljeed, situated in the northwestern Awdal region of Somaliland. He hails from the Jibreel Younis sub-clan of the Gadabuursi clan. He was educated in Amoud, and was later trained in Mogadishu.

== Career ==
=== Early career ===
Kahin's previous posts included a diplomatic position at the Somali Embassy in Djibouti.

In the last years of the Siad Barre government, during the 1980s, Kahin was the highest-ranking National Security Service (NSS) officer in Berbera. He was stationed in Las Anod in 1981 to 1982.

In the early 1990s, Kahin served as Governor of Awdal.

From 1997 to 2002, Kahin served as the Vice President of Somaliland.

=== President of Somaliland ===
On 3 May 2002, Kahin became the third President of Somaliland, after the death of the self-declared republic's President Muhammad Haji Ibrahim Egal. Kahin later won the elections on 14 April 2003, representing the Ururka Dimuqraadiga Umada Bahawday (UDUB), or United Democratic People's Party. He was sworn into office on 16 May, the day after Egal's funeral.

In 2007, a delegation led by President Kahin was present at the 2007 Commonwealth Heads of Government Meeting in Kampala, Uganda.

In 2008, Kahin established by decree new regions and districts, which drew criticism. Regions and districts in Somaliland are not just an instrument for the organisation of local government, they are also used as electoral districts. Kahin's move was considered by several to have motives rooted in electoral and clan-politics. Moreover, as these new regions and districts were never geographically delimitated, they argued that he saddled the region with a legacy that hampers the efficient organisation of local government to this day.

Throughout his tenure as President of Somaliland, Kahim sought to maintain peace and tranquility in the region. His administration contributed to various state-building and institutional development initiatives. In terms of democratization, his government also successfully organized local council elections, parliamentary elections, and two presidential elections. Additionally, Kahin is noted for having peacefully transferred power to his successor in office, President Ahmed Mohamed Mohamoud.

Political offices
Preceded by Abdirahman Aw Ali Farrah	Vice President of Somaliland; 1997–2002	Succeeded by Ahmed Yusuf Yasin
Preceded by Muhammad Haji Ibrahim Egal	President of Somaliland; 2002–2010	Succeeded by Ahmed Mahamoud Silanyo
