= United Peoples' Democratic Party =

Political party in Somaliland

United Peoples' Democratic Party Ururka Dimuqraadiga Ummadda Bahawday
- Founder: Muhammad Haji Ibrahim Egal
- Founded: 10 July 2001
- Dissolved: December 2011/ December 2012
- Headquarters: Hargeisa
- Ideology: Nationalism; Islamic democracy

Party flag

The United Peoples' Democratic Party (Somali: Ururka Dimuqraadiga Ummadda Bahawday), shortened UDUB, was one of the three political parties in Somaliland. It was founded by president Egal On 10 July 2001 in the preparation of the elections, which were originally scheduled for December 2001, but then postponed. It dissolved in December 2011 with its members joining other political parties. Two of Somaliland's first 3 presidents were from this party. The party was usually supported by some sub-clans of the Dir.

At the presidential elections, April 14, 2003, its candidate Dahir Riyale Kahin won 42.1% of the popular vote and was elected.

According to the final results of the 2005 parliamentary election, UDUB won 39.0% of the vote and 33 out of 82 seats, while the two opposition parties UCID and Kulmiye, won the rest of the seats.

== History of leaders ==
Picture	Name	Term start	Term end	Date of birth	Date of death	Notes
	Muhammad Haji Ibrahim Egal محمد حاجي إبراهيم عقال	May 16, 1993	May 3, 2002	August 15, 1928	May 3, 2002	2nd President of Somaliland; May 16, 1993 - May 3, 2002 (Died in office)
	Dahir Riyale Kahin طاهر ريالي كاهن	3 May 2002	27 July 2010	12 March 1952		3rd President of Somaliland; May 3, 2002 - 27 July 2010; 4th Vice President of Somaliland; May 16, 1997 - May 3, 2002

== Electoral history ==
=== Presidential elections ===
Election	Party candidate	Votes	%	Result
2003	Dahir Riyale Kahin	205,595	42.08%	Elected ✓
2010	Dahir Riyale Kahin	178,881	33.23%	Lost ✗

=== Parliament of Somaliland elections ===
Election	Votes	%	Seats	+/–	Position
2005	261,449	39.0%	33 / 82	▲33	▲1st

=== Local elections ===
Election	Votes	%	Seats	+/–	Position
2002	179,389	40.76%	154 / 379	▲154	▲1st

== See also ==
- List of political parties in Somaliland
