= Muse Bihi Abdi =

President of Somaliland from 2017 to 2024

- Muuse Biixi Cabdi موسى بيحي عبدي
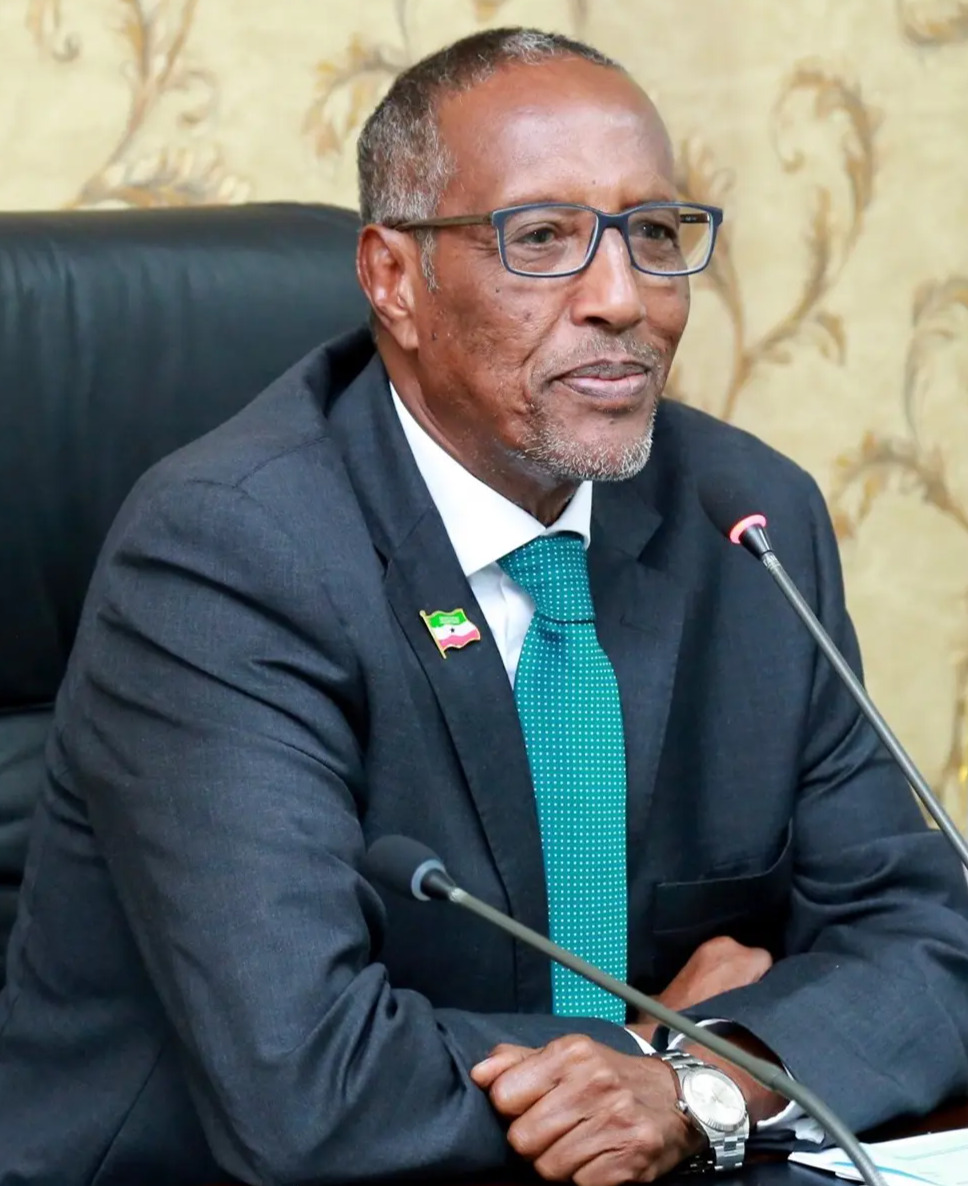
- Muse Bihi in 2022

5th President of Somaliland
- In office 13 December 2017 – 13 December 2024
- Vice President: Abdirahman Saylici
- Preceded by: Ahmed Mohamed Mohamoud
- Succeeded by: Abdirahman Mohamed Abdullahi

Chairman of Peace, Unity, and Development Party
- In office 31 December 2010 – 21 August 2023
- Preceded by: Ahmed Mohamed Mohamoud
- Succeeded by: Mohamed Kahin Ahmed

Minister of Interior
- In office 1993–1995
- President: Muhammad Haji Ibrahim Egal
- Preceded by: Suleiman Mohamoud Adan
- Succeeded by: Ahmed Jaambiir Suldan

Personal details
- Born: 16 June 1948 (age 78) Hargeisa, British Somaliland
- Party: Peace, Unity, and Development Party
- Children: 7
- Education: University of Hargeisa

Military service
- Allegiance: Somali Democratic Republic (1970–1985); SNM (1985–1991); Somaliland (1991-present)
- Branch/service: Somali Air Force
- Years of service: 1970–1991
- Battles/wars: SNM

Musa Bihi Abdi (Somali: Muuse Biixi Cabdi, Arabic: موسى بيحي عبدي; born 16 June 1948) is a Somalilander politician and former military officer who served as the 5th President of Somaliland from 2017 to 2024.

During the 1970s, he served as a pilot in the Somali Air Force under the Siad Barre administration. In 2005, Bihi was appointed the chairman of the ruling Kulmiye party in Somaliland. In November 2015, Bihi was selected as the party's Presidential Candidate at the 5th annual central committee convention.

On 21 November 2017 Muse was announced the winner of the 2017 presidential election, and officially became the President of Somaliland on 13 December 2017. He lost his reelection bid to Abdirahman Mohamed Abdullahi in the 2024 presidential election.

== Early life ==
Muse was born in the outskirts of Hargeisa in 1948, then part of the British Somaliland protectorate. He attended Amoud Secondary School, which he graduated from in 1970.

== Military career ==
Muse joined the Somali Air Force in the early 70's and trained as an officer in the Soviet Union until 1973, where he graduated with a bachelor's degree from the Academy of Pilots in Dushanbe, Tajik SSR (present-day Tajikistan). Upon the completion of the training he was stationed in air bases in Baledogle, Baidoa as well as the air force's main base in Mogadishu.

From 1981 to 1985 Muse received further military training in the United States, including at the Wright-Patterson Air Force Base near Dayton, Ohio from 1981 to 1982, as well as Fort Lee in Virginia from 1983 to 1985.

In 1985, he defected from the Somali Air Force and joined the rebel Somali National Movement (SNM) that eventually helped to successfully oust the Siad Barre's regime during the Somaliland War of Independence in 1991.

From 1985 to 1988, Bihi took part in conducting intensive guerrilla war operations conducted by the SNM during the war against the Barre's regime. Until 1990, Bihi served as rebel commander before joining politics and serving as home affairs minister under the late President Muhammad Haji Ibrahim Egal in 1994.

== Political career ==
=== Somali Democratic Republic ===
From 1973 to 1985 Muse held high ranking positions in the government of the Somali Democratic Republic, including the head of the training department of the Somali Air Force as well as the military attaché of the Somali embassy in Washington.

=== Egal administration ===
After the declaration of Independence of Somaliland in 1991, Col. Muse played a vital role in the reconciliation process between the northern Somali clans in Burao, Berbera, Sheekh and Borama.

In 1993, Muse served as Minister of Interior and National Security in late President Muhammad Haji Ibrahim Egal's government.

=== Silanyo administration ===
In 2010, Muse became the chairman of Somaliland's Kulmiye Party, after serving as the vice chairman of the party from 2008. In 2015, he was elected by the Party Congress as the Kulmiye presidential candidate in the forthcoming 2017 presidential election.

=== 2017 presidential election ===
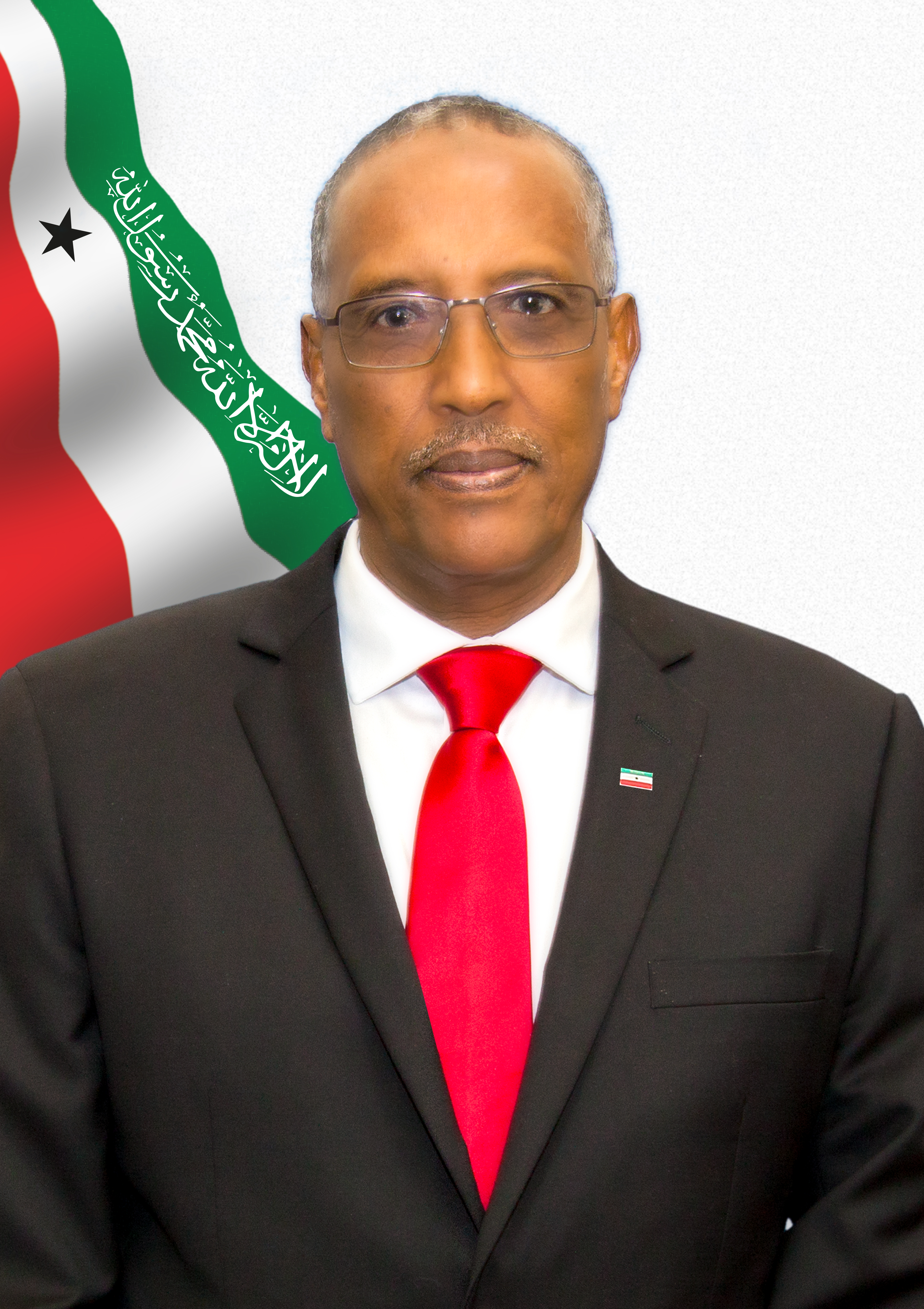
Official presidential portrait.

The 2017 Somaliland presidential elections were held on 13 November 2017. On 21 November Muse was announced as the winner of the election, becoming President-elect of Somaliland.

== Presidency ==
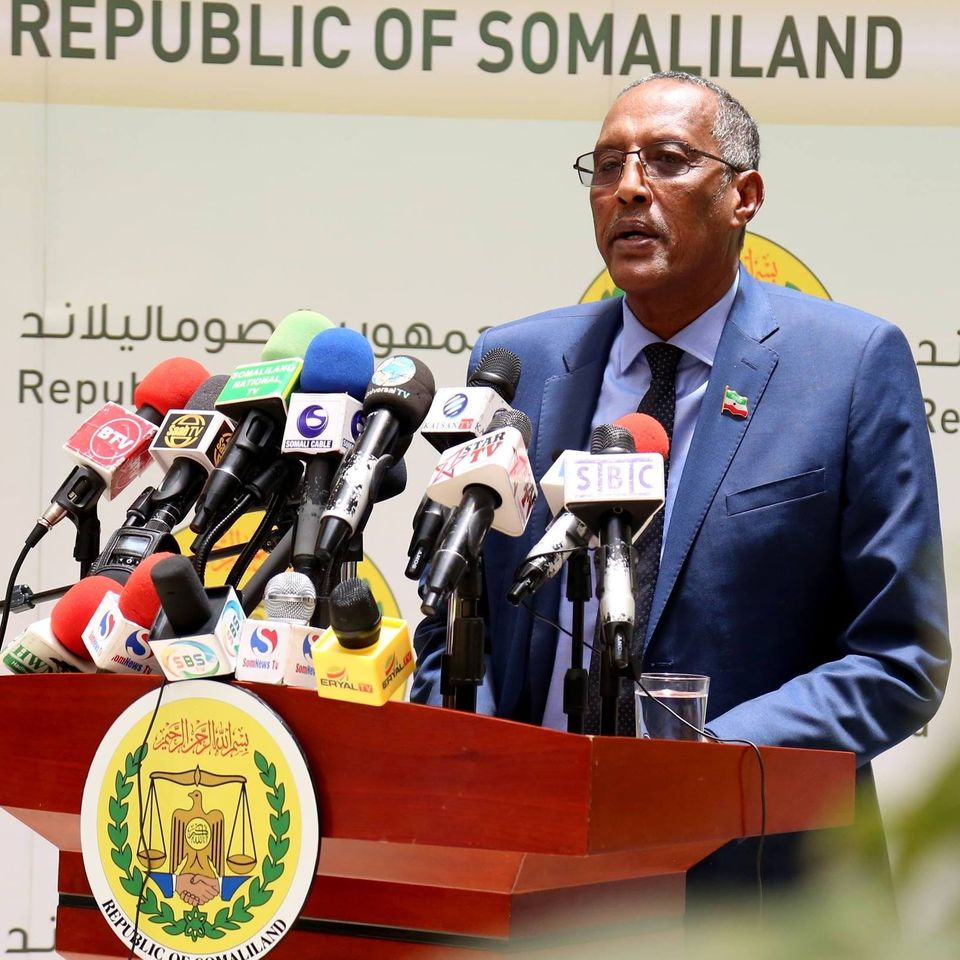
5th President of Somaliland.

Muse Bihi Abdi was officially sworn in as the 5th President of the Republic of Somaliland on 13 December 2017 in the capital Hargeisa with dignitaries from Ethiopia, Djibouti, the European Union and the United Kingdom in attendance.

In the 2024 Somaliland presidential election, Abdi lost his reelection bid to Abdirahman Mohamed Abdullahi, receiving 35% of the vote to Abdullahi's 64%.

== Personal life ==
Muse has two wives and seven children, three sons and four daughters.
