= President of Somaliland =

Head of state and of government of Somaliland

President of the Republic of Somaliland
- Madaxweynaha Jamhuuriyadda Soomaaliland (Somali)
- Presidential seal

- Flag of the president of Somaliland

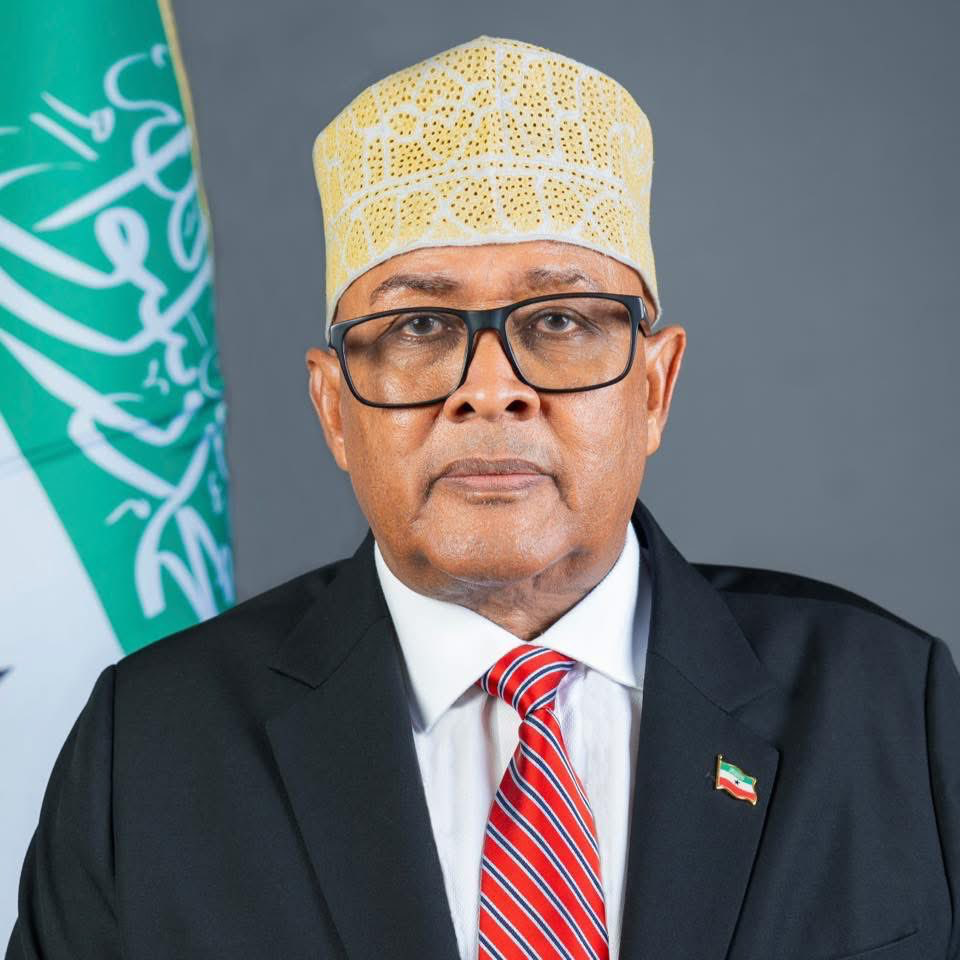
- Incumbent; Abdirahman Mohamed Abdullahi since 13 December 2024
- Style: His Excellency; Mr. President
- Type: Head of state; Head of government; Commander-in-chief
- Member of: Cabinet of Somaliland
- Residence: Presidential Palace
- Seat: Hargeisa
- Appointer: Direct election
- Term length: 5 years, renewable once
- Constituting instrument: Constitution of Somaliland
- Formation: 28 May 1991; 35 years ago
- First holder: Abdirahman Ahmed Ali Tuur
- Deputy: Vice President of Somaliland
- Website: Official website

The president of the Republic of Somaliland (Somali: Madaxweynaha Jamhuuriyadda Soomaaliland; Arabic: رئيس جمهورية صوماليلاند, romanized: Rayiys jumhuriat Soomaliland) is the head of state and head of government of Somaliland. The president is also commander-in-chief of the Somaliland Armed Forces. The president represents the Government of Somaliland.

The first president of Somaliland was Abdirahman Ahmed Ali Tuur. The current office-holder is the 6th president Abdirahman Mohamed Abdullahi, who took office on 12 December 2024. The President can serve a maximum of two five-year terms.

The Republic of Somaliland regards itself as the successor state to the former British Somaliland Protectorate, which was an independent country for a few days in 1960 as the State of Somaliland.

== History ==
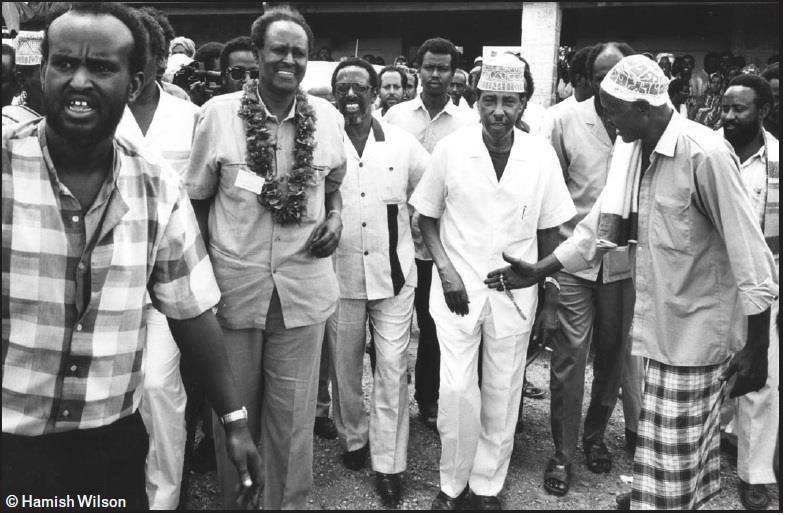
The outgoing president, Abdirahman Ahmed Ali Tuur, leaves the hall alongside newly elected president, Muhammad Haji Ibrahim Egal. Tuur is being congratulated by an elder man on his decision to accept the outcome of the election and stand down peacefully after several days intense debate and negotiation.

The first president of Somaliland was Abdirahman Ahmed Ali Tuur, one of the leaders of the Somali National Movement (SNM), who took office on 7 June 1991, weeks after Somaliland was declared a republic. Since then the office has been held by four further people: Muhammad Haji Ibrahim Egal, Dahir Riyale Kahin, Ahmed Mohamed Mohamoud, and Muse Bihi Abdi.

== Eligibility ==
By Article 82 of the Constitution of Somaliland, a person shall be eligible for the office of President or Vice President if (a) he is a citizen of Somaliland by birth, and, notwithstanding residence as a refugee in another country, must not hold any other citizenship; (b) he must be a Muslim, and must behave in accordance with Islamic religion; (c) he must be at least 40 years of age; and (d) he fulfills other criteria set out in this Article.

== Death in office ==
One Somaliland president has died in office:

- Muhammad Haji Ibrahim Egal, who died on 3 May 2002 aged 73.

== Latest election ==
Candidate	Running mate	Party	Votes	%
Abdirahman Mohamed Abdullahi Irro	Mohamed Aw-Ali Abdi	Waddani	407,908	63.95
Muse Bihi Abdi	Mohamoud Hassan Saajin	Kulmiye	225,219	35.31
Faysal Ali Warabe	Abdirashid Duale Diriye	For Justice and Development	4,699	0.74
Total			637,826	100.00
Valid votes			637,826	98.45
Invalid/blank votes			10,037	1.55
Total votes			647,863	100.00
Registered voters/turnout			1,227,048	52.80
Source: HO, Registered

== See also ==
- Somaliland
  - Politics of Somaliland
  - Vice President of Somaliland
- Lists of office-holders
