= Justice and Welfare Party =

Former political party in Somaliland

Justice and Welfare Party Ururka Caddaalada iyo Daryeelka
- Abbreviation: UCID
- Leader: Faysal Ali Warabe
- Founder: Faysal Ali Warabe
- Founded: 2001
- Dissolved: December 2024
- Succeeded by: Kaah Alliance for Equality and Development
- Headquarters: Hargeisa
- Ideology: Social democracy; Somalilander nationalism
- Political position: Centre-left
- International affiliation: Socialist International (observer)
- House of Representatives: 21 / 82
- Local councillors: 48 / 220

Party flag

Website
- www.xisbigaucid.com

The Justice and Welfare Party (Somali: Ururka Caddaalada iyo Daryeelka, UCID; Arabic: حزب العدالة والتنمية), sometimes translated as the Justice and Welfare Association, and also known as For Justice and Development, was the oldest political party in Somaliland. The party tended to be supported by people from the Cidagale and Garxajis and some sub-clans of the Isaaq.

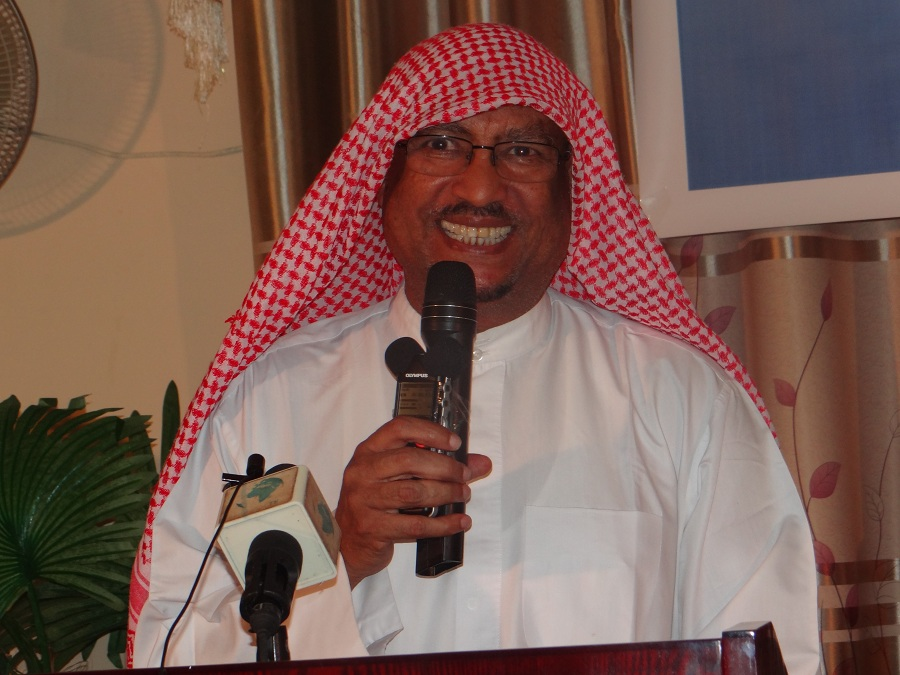
Faysal Ali Warabe, the founder and Chairman of the For Justice and Development (UCID) political party.

UCID was founded in 2001 by Somaliland politician Faysal Ali Warabe, with its program being inspired by that of the Finnish Social Democratic Party. Waraabe also served as its Chairman. The party had been described as the only one at a national level that adhered to a specific political ideology.

Based in Hargeisa, the political party came in third place during the 2003 Somaliland presidential election, receiving 16% of the votes.

In the parliamentary elections held on 29 September 2005, the party won 26.9% of the vote and 21 out of 82 seats.

In the 2024 Somaliland national political party elections, the party came in 7th place. As a result of this it lost its official status as only 3 political parties are allowed to exist and contest regular elections in Somaliland. It was replaced by the Kaah party.

== Election results ==
=== Presidential elections ===
Election	Party candidate	Votes	%	Result
2003	Faisal Ali Warabe	77,433	15.85%	Lost ✗
2010	Faisal Ali Warabe	92,459	17.18%	Lost ✗
2017	Faisal Ali Warabe	23,141	4.17%	Lost ✗
2024	Faisal Ali Warabe	4,699	0.74%	Lost ✗

=== Parliamentary elections ===
Election	Votes	%	Seats	+/–	Position
2005	180,545	26.93%	21 / 82	New	▲3rd
2021	179,937	25.85%	21 / 82	0	3rd

=== Local elections ===
Election	Votes	%	Seats	+/–	Position
2002	49,444	11.24%	43 / 379	▲43	▲3rd
2012	105,105	12.96%	40 / 323	▼3	3rd
2021	159,801	23.18%	48 / 220	▲8	3rd

== See also ==
- Somaliland
- List of political parties in Somaliland
