= 2026 in Somaliland =

- Decades: 2000s; 2010s; 2020s
- See also: History of Somaliland; List of years in Somaliland

Events in the year 2026 in Somaliland.

== Incumbents ==
- President: Abdirahman Mohamed Abdullahi
- Vice President: Mohamed Aw-Ali Abdi
- Speaker of the House: Yasin Haji Mohamoud
- Chairman of Elders: Suleiman Mohamoud Adan
- Chief Justice: Adan Haji Ali
- Minister of Foreign Affairs: Abdirahman Dahir Adam

== Events ==
- 6 January – Israeli foreign minister Gideon Sa'ar visits Somaliland following Israel's decision to recognize the territory as an independent state.
- 25 February –
  - Somaliland appoints Mohamed Omar Hagi Mohamoud as its first ambassador to Israel.
  - 2026 Somaliland municipal elections
- 26 April – Israel appoints its first ambassador to Somaliland.

== Holidays ==
- 1 January – New Year's Day
- 21 March – Eid al-Fitr
- 1 May – Labour Day
- 18 May – Somaliland Declaration of Independence
- 27 – 28 May – Eid al-Adha
- 17 June – Islamic New Year
- 26 June – Independence Day
- 26 June – Ashura
- 26 August – The Prophet's Birthday

== See also ==
- Al-Shabaab (militant group)
- 2026 in Somalia
