= 2022 in Somaliland =

- Decades: 2000s; 2010s; 2020s
- See also: History of Somaliland; List of years in Somaliland

Events in the year 2022 in Somaliland.

== Incumbents ==
- President: Muse Bihi Abdi
- Vice President: Abdirahman Saylici
- Speaker of the House: Abdirisak Khalif
- Chairman of Elders: Suleiman Mohamoud Adan
- Chief Justice: Adan Haji Ali
- Minister of Foreign Affairs: Essa Kayd

== Events ==
Ongoing – Somali Civil War (2009–present); COVID-19 pandemic in Somaliland

=== January ===
- January–February – The mayor of Borama estimated that at least 10,000 refugees from the Tigray War had crossed over the border from Ethiopia to the city.
- 6 January – Presidential candidate Abdirahman Mohamed Abdullahi and chairman Hirsi Ali Haji Hassan visited Burao to campaign for the Waddani party and against the leadership of President Abdi. The rally was attended by a "huge reception" according to Abdullahi.
- 7 January – The Minister for Communication and Technology Hon Abdiweli Sheikh Abdillahi Sufi Jibril conducted talks with representatives from the Somaliland Online Media Association (SOMA) to discuss the ongoing progress on the Social Media Code of Conduct bill.
- 10 January – The Cheetah Conservation Fund (CCF) and Ministry of Environment and Climate Change broke ground on the construction of the 800ha CCF Somaliland Cheetah Rescue and Conservation Centre (CRCC). The construction is said to take place in phases over the coming year. When complete, the CRCC will provide a permanent home for cubs rescued from the illegal pet trade or human-wildlife conflict situations and provide Somaliland with a tourist destination.
- 14 January – The National Authority for Drought Preparedness and Emergency Responses (NADFOR) declared a national Drought Alert after a months-long study by the government concluded that 810,000 families were now at risk for food and water insecurity.
- 16 January – The Supreme Court reaffirmed the legality of the original Law 14 of 2011, reaffirming the nation is representative democracy over a direct one.
- 18 January – Around two dozen British MPs convened to discuss the recognition of Somaliland's independence in a motion introduced by Conservative MP Gavin Williamson, close ally of President Abdi.
- 22 January – Mass celebrations took place across the nation with Somalilanders waving the national and British flags to celebrate a push by MPs in the United Kingdom to recognize Somaliland as a nation.
- 25 January – A delegation from the European Union and the United Kingdom met with MPs from the House of Representatives to discuss future bills the House was planning, as well as the nation's prevailing politics. The delegation said they were impressed by the House's ability to resolve "seemingly insurmountable obstacles" regarding having women in government, civic engagement in politics, and other conflicts.
- 26 January – The Waddani and UCID opposition parties held talks with each other and international partners to discuss furthering democracy and development within the nation. The upcoming 13 November presidential elections were also "deeply discussed".
- 28 January – In a statement released by the President of Ethiopia Sahle-Work Zewde, the Ethiopian Representation Office in Hargeisa was officially promoted to Embassy-status. The move was organized on a three-day trip Zewde made to the nation on 19 January to discuss "issues of mutual interest" between him and President Abdi.
- 29 January – President Abdi approved a new seven-member political associations registration committee. The committee was appointed to resolve multiple party schedule disputes before the upcoming elections on 13 November.
- 31 January – Taiwan gifted 150,000 doses of its domestically developed Medigen COVID-19 vaccine as part of the nations renewed vaccine diplomacy push.

=== February ===
- 1 February – President Abdi offered the United States military use of the Berbera seaport and airfield overlooking strategic maritime routes in exchange for steps toward recognizing the region as a sovereign country.
- 3 February – Environmental Minister Shukri Ismail Haji announces plans to open a national park "where the cheetahs will be able to roam".
- 8 February
  - The House of Representatives approved 425 million Somaliland Shillings to be released to help combat drought in the more harshly affected regions of the nation. A statement was also issued calling for international assistance to help those affected by the drought.
  - An agreement is reached between the nation's three telecom and internet giants Somtel, Telesom, and Somcable to establish high-speed underground fiber-optic services to serve the nation as a whole.
- 9–13 February – FM Kayd conducted a five-day tour of Taiwan at the Presidential Office Building in Taipei, meeting with President Tsai Ing-wen. One of the main goals of his visit was to extol the potential for Taiwanese companies to take advantage of Somaliland's abundant natural resources. The visit was highly condemned by China.
- 13 February – President Abdi held a "solidarity" banquet for all MPs of the nation's House of Representatives. At the banquet, discussions were held on multiple issues which saw possible alliance form between some political parties.
- 16 February – President Abdi held a meeting with two UN delegations at the Presidential Palace. The meeting discussed building further bilateral relations with the UN and plans on how to combat the ongoing drought in the nation.
- 21 February – Taiwan's envoy to Somaliland, Allen C. Lou (羅震華), gave a $500,000 USD ($13.9 million TWD) donation to VP Saylici to combat severe drought within the nation. Taiwan also announces plans of sending 300 tons of rice to help with the ongoing food shortage.
- 26 February – Welsh MP Alun Cairns discussed the recognition of Somaliland independence to the United Nations (UN) and possible funding for the region.

=== March ===
- March – Somaliland was affected by a historic multi-season drought, with 14 million people severely food insecure across the Horn of Africa.
- 14 March – President Abdi traveled to the United States to speak in Washington D.C., where he admitted negotiations with Somalia had failed and that he would be continue efforts towards international recognition.
- 15 March – Sheikh Adan Sunne, a controversial religious scholar who went missing days ago from Somaliland was found in Jilib, having defected with his family and joining Al-Shabaab (militant group).
- 17 March – US senators Jim Risch (R-Idaho), Chris Van Hollen (D-Maryland), and Mike Rounds (R-South Dakota), introduced a bill titled the Somaliland Partnership Act, which called for closer U.S. engagement with the officially unrecognized nation.
- 18 March – Freelance online journalists Abdisalan Ahmed Awad, Ali Mahdi Jibril, and Saab TV reporter Shafic Mohamed Ibrahim were allegedly dragged from their car and beaten by five intelligence officers in Hargeisa. The attack was especially focused on Abdisalan who recently wrote critically about President Abdi on Facebook.
- 21 March – US officials released statements against the recognition of the independence of Somaliland, but agreed upon closer ties with the self-proclaimed nation.
- 29 March – Former Foreign Minister Edna Adan Ismail was elected president of the Unrepresented Nations and Peoples Organization (UNPO).

=== April ===
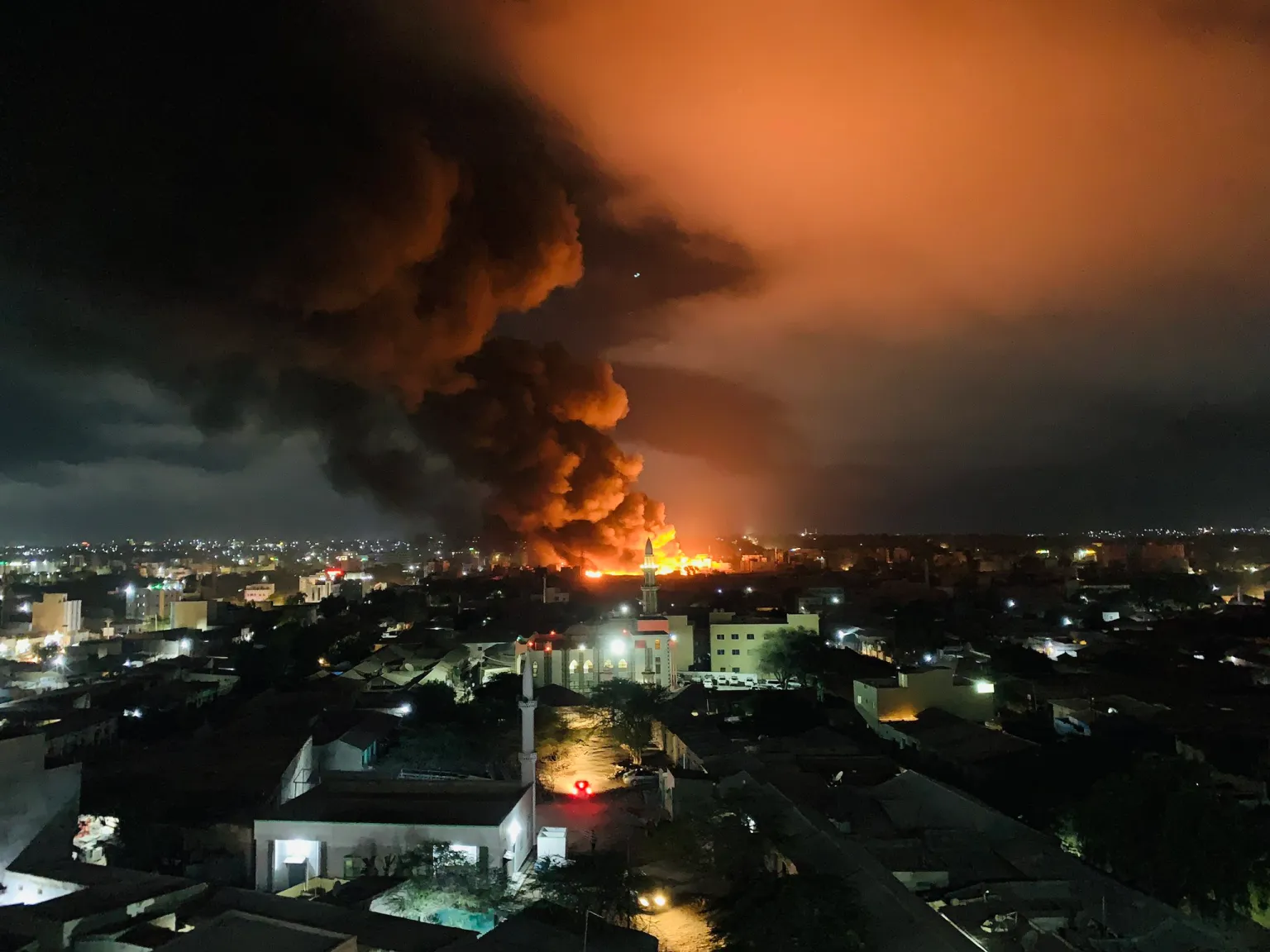
The 2022 Waheen Market fire on the night of 1 April.

- 1 April – 2022 Waheen Market fire: A large fire ignited in the major Waheen Market in the capitol Hargeisa which destroyed an estimated 2,000 shops and stalls and injured 28 people.
- 3 April – Intelligence officers in Hargeisa arrested freelance online journalist Abdisalan Ahmed Abdisalan shortly after he broke his fast for Ramadan at a local restaurant, allegedly for speaking out about his March 18 attack.
- 4 April – 2022 Waheen Market fire: Somalia offered to send $11.7 million to Hargeisa to help the families of those who lost their lives and property in the Waheen Market fire. There was debate among politicians and the families that needed the money if they should accept money from the country they were trying to separate from.
- 5 April
  - 2022 Waheen Market fire: The US city Minneapolis' Somali community and 40 organizers came together to raise awareness and launch fundraisers for people affected by the Waheen Market fire on 1 April, according to organizer Abdirahman Kahin.
  - San Francisco 49ers cornerback Ambry Thomas traveled across the nation with NPO Mercy-USA to give back to impoverished communities during Ramadan.
- 6 April – 2022 Waheen Market fire: Somaliland officials launched an international appeal for $2 billion to urgently deliver humanitarian and livelihood support, particularly towards the estimated 5,000 family businesses destroyed in the fire. 2 billion was chosen as the amount as that was the estimated loss caused by the fire.
- 11 April – The Committee to Protect Journalists (CPJ) demanded the unconditional release of freelance online journalist Abdisalan Ahmed Awad, after his arrest on April 3, and hold the intelligence officers who harassed and assaulted him and two other journalists on 18 March responsible.
- 13 April – A group of at least nine journalists were arrested by police officers after reporting on a prison fight between the inmates and guards in Hargeisa. In the evening, Horn Cable TV offices, which was one of the stations that aired the breaking news, were raided by police officers, who arrested six more journalists for reporting on "unconfirmed news" and for "exaggerating the incident," according to the head of Somaliland's Custodial Corps Ahmed Awale Yusuf. The committee to Protect Journalists (CPJ) announced they were working towards the journalists "unconditional release".
- 20 April
  - Somaliland police released all but three journalists; Mohamed Abdi Ilig Mohamed (MM Somali TV), Abdirahman Ali Khalif (Gobonimo TV), and Abdijabar Mohamed Hussein (Horn Cable TV), who are transferred to a central prison.
  - 2022 Waheen Market fire: Qatar's Fund for Development, in cooperation with the Qatar Emiri Air Force, sent 45 tons of food aid parcels to help alleviate families affected by harsh drought conditions and the Waheen Market fire.
- 27 April – 2022 Waheen Market fire: Taiwan's Ministry of Foreign Affairs donated USD $500,000 to help the victims of the Hargeisa Market fire on 1 April.
- 28 April – 2022 Waheen Market fire: The Canadian Alliance to Rebuild Hargeisa Market, members of Canada's Somaliland community, met with MPs in Ottawa to provide $10 million in aid toward rebuilding efforts, and to match funds raised by local community groups across Canada.
- 30 April – 2022 Waheen Market fire: The Taiwanese government and two Taiwanese NGOs donated US$550,000 (NT $16.91 million) and a container of humanitarian supplies to help those affected by the Waheen Market fire on 1 April. The envoy, headed by Allen Lou (羅震華), handed the money and container of aid to Somaliland authorities.

=== May ===
- 3 May – A senior army officer was arrested for allegedly shooting dead the young bride Najma Abdullahi, who was currently serving as a Secretary to the director of the Ministry of Agriculture. He may face execution for his crime according to a police officer working with the BBC.
- 6 May – Somaliland was connected to the Pakistan & East Africa Connecting Europe (PEACE) submarine cable system in Berbera, which promised to substantially reduce network latency in the nation by adopting a shortest-direct-route connection.
- 9 May – Reporters Mohamed Abdi Mohamed (MM Somali TV), Abdirahman Ali Khalif (Gobonnimo TV), and Abdijabar Mohamed Hussein (Horn Cable TV), who had been detained since 13 April, were charged with "subversive propaganda" and spreading "false, exaggerated, and tendentious information liable to disturb public order". This decision is criticized by Reporters without borders (RSF) and the secretary general of the National Union of Somali Journalists (NUSOJ).
- 13 May – The United States announced it will not promote "the secessionist ideology being pushed by Somaliland" and will continue to promote their Single Somalia Policy, despite attempts from President Abdi to seek recognition on March 14. Closer ties are also agreed upon with officials.
- 18 May – Representative of Somaliland to Canada Loula Isman and Secretary of Finance for the Waddani Party Ahmed Hersi visited Edmonton, Canada to celebrate the 31st anniversary of the nation's independence with Canadian Somalilanders.
- 21 May – Djibouti national and vocal critic of his nation's president Aare Saleebaan Owleed was detained in the Gabiley District by security forces without comment on the reason for his arrest. Owleed calls on the government and people of Somaliland to not extradite him back to Djibouti in fear of grave punishment.
- 23 May
  - An agreement was signed with Taiwan regarding energy and mineral resource cooperation, which provided "a legal foundation for joint resource exploration and drilling activities," according to Taiwan's office in Somaliland. The agreement was signed by Economic Affairs Minister Wang Mei-hua (王美花) and Energy and Minerals Minister Abdilahi Farah Abdi in Taipei.
  - Hargeisa Regional Court sentenced two journalists (who have been detained since 13 April) Mohamed Abdi Ilig of MM Somali TV and Abdijabar Mohamed Hussein of Horn Cable TV up to 16 months in prison for reporting "subversive or anti-national propaganda". This decision was highly criticized by the CPJ, especially after reports by the Somali Journalists Syndicate (SJS) announced that Mohamed was seriously ill and that his condition had only worsened while in jail.
- 24 May – A Memorandum of Understanding is signed with the Postal Corporation of Kenya (PCK) by the Kenyan Cabinet Secretary for Information and Communications, Innovation, and Youth Affairs Joseph Mucheru and Deputy Ambassador to Kenya Sharmake Gele at the PCK headquarters in Nairobi, Kenya. The agreement will explore cooperation in international mail processing and delivery, as well as in electronic data interchange (EDI).
- 25 May
  - Four members of the Political Associations and Parties Registration Committee recently approved by the Somaliland House of Representatives were sworn in by Chairman of the Supreme Court Adan Haji Ali Ahmed, with President Abdi in attendance.
  - A meeting was held in Hargeisa between President Abdi representing the ruling Kulmiye party, with representatives from the opposition Waddani and Justice and Welfare (UCID) parties. The meeting was called to discuss 5 points of concern about the upcoming November 13 presidential elections, but no agreements were made with the Kulmiye party and the meeting ended in a stalemate.

=== June ===
- June – The ongoing drought within the nation grew more severe with the summer months which made way for massive outbreaks of common and preventable diseases such as measles and cholera, which previously had not been seen within the nation for an extended amount of time. There were an estimated 6,000 cases of measles in the nation and thousands of cases of child malnourishment.
- 2 June – President Abdi, along with Deputy Minister of Foreign Affairs Abdinasir Omar Jama and the Director General of the Presidency of Somaliland Mohamed Ali Bille, met with European Union (EU) Ambassador Tiina Intelmann and Swedish Ambassadors Per Lindgärde and Maria Groeneveld in the Somaliland Presidential Palace. The meeting was organized to discuss the upcoming presidential elections and the ongoing drought within the nation and how the EU could potentially help.
- 5 June – Waddani opposition party leader and presidential candidate Abdirahman Mohamed Abdullahi (Irro) told supporters at a restaurant in Hargeisa to join him in protest of President Abdi, who he accused of being responsible for the resignation of members of the Electoral Commission for failing to hold the 13 November elections.
- 9 June
  - The protests called by opposition party leader Abdullahi on 5 June began in Hargeisa, blocking roads in some areas. Live rounds were reportedly fired into the crowd to disperse the protests by security forces, causing an unspecified number of injuries. Security forces also arrested several protesters including an unnamed local opposition figure.
  - A revised Somaliland Partnership Act, introduced to the US senate on 17 March, passes. The legislation required the Department of State to report to Congress on engagement with Somaliland, and to conduct a feasibility study regarding the establishment of a partnership between the two nations.
- 10 June
  - Protests by the opposition parties Waddani and UCID against the management of the upcoming presidential elections in Hargeisa ended. Video of the protests from the day before showed national security forces spraying tear gas and kicking protesters, while the protesters were seen shooting at the police riot cars as they arrived at the scene. Many injuries, mainly gunshot wounds, occurred on both sides but no deaths were reported. The Waddani party officials taken into police custody after the protests included Abdullahi Mohamed Dahir "Ukusse" (former minister), Ahmed Omar Abdullahi (deputy chairman), Mohamed Yussuf Waabeeye (deputy chairman), Mohamed Farah (Interior Affairs Secretary), and at least a dozen more regional officers. The only member of the UCID party taken into custody was Yussuf Keyse, Secretary of Information.
  - The protests from the day before is officially condemned by the governments of the EU, United Kingdom, Sweden, Denmark, Finland, Netherlands, and Norway.
- 11 June
  - Ethiopia's attempt to acquire the Berbera port since 2018 ended after the nation "failed to meet the conditions needs to acquire the stakes before the deadline," according to Finance Minister Saad Ali Shire. Ethiopia reportedly lost 19% of its stake in the port because of its failure to meet this deadline.
  - The House of Representatives received nominations for the new seven-member National Electoral Commission (NEC) from the President's office.
- 12 June – President Abdi, along with multiple ministers and speakers of parliament Suleiman Mohamoud Mohamed of the Guurti and Hon and Abdirizak Khalif Ahmed of the House of Representatives, traveled by air to Erigavo to attend the closing ceremony of the grand conference of an important clan in the region. While there, Abdi also cut the ribbon for developmental projects implemented in the region including the Mit fishing jetty, Erigavo airstrip, and the 300-kilometer-long road connecting the region to the rest of the country.
- 13 June – President Abdi spoke towards crowds in the Erigavo District, expressing sorrow over the 9 June protests in Hargeisa, explaining he did not let the opposition parties hold the peaceful protests they wanted after they "wrote a letter informing us that they were being held hostage" and were being harassed, which "just was not true", according to Abdi.
- 14 June – Kenya expressed their "regrets" towards Somalia after inviting a Somaliland official to a diplomatic luncheon hosted by President Uhuru Kenyatta where the Somalia ambassador to Kenya Mohamoud Ahmed Nur was also a guest. Nur regarded the presence of the Somaliland official at the meeting and the presence of the Somaliland flag as "inappropriate" and walked out. A statement later released by the national government said they were "outraged" by the ambassador's actions.
- 21 June – In a partnership with International NGO SPARK; the Islamic Development Bank (IsDB) and Islamic Solidarity Fund for Development (ISFD) launched a support program for companies in Somalia and Somaliland affected by COVID-19.
- 26 June
  - Somaliland celebrated its 62nd anniversary of independence from the British. President Abdi in a speech celebrating the day, also mentioned his views that newly elected Somalia President Mohamud is "the right candidate" to break the stalemate of Somaliland independence talks from Somalia.
  - New Somalia Prime Minister Hamza Abdi Barre announced plans to continue forward with Somalia-Somaliland separation talks as soon as "trust [is] built".
- 27 June – MSG Group of Companies, through its subsidiary Horn Holding Group ltd (HHG), signed an agreement with Bedeschi SPA Italy to begin phase 1 of the construction of a full cement plant in Berbera. Phase 1 will take about 18 months and will have a production capacity of 0.7 metric tons per year (Mt/yr). The full plant will be completed after 3 years, with a final production capacity of 1.2Mt/yr of cement and 1.0Mt/yr of clinker, making exporting possible. This is believed to put Somaliland "in the maps of a cement producing nation".
- 29 June – The Minister of Religion & Awqaf announced that Somaliland would not participate in the Hajj this year after accusing the successive governments of Somalia of interfering and obstructing the affairs of Hajj, and claiming Somaliland did not receive the share of its pilgrims from the Federal Government this year.

=== July ===
- 5 July – President Abdi held talks with opposition party leaders after the fallout over the recent election polls, in which Abdi was accused by his rivals of attempting to delay the upcoming elections this year. The talks, which continued for the next two days, led to the release of 12 politicians from Mandera Prison near Hargeisa.
- 8 July – A new attraction designed by Rashid Ali Architects is unveiled in the Courtyard Pavilion in Hargeisa. The attraction consisted of a pink-concrete pavilion with a seating area around the middle "miniature botanical garden".
- 11 July
  - Four–time United Kingdom Olympic gold medalist Mo Farah revealed in a BBC documentary that his birth name was Hussein Abdi Kahin, and that he was born in Somaliland and trafficked out of the country to the UK by a "strange woman" when he was only eight or nine years old to "look after younger children". The London Metropolitan Police shortly after opened an investigation into the matter.
  - The Minister of Defense Abdiqani Mohamud Ateye called The Times of Israel's recent report that he, along with a delegation of Somaliland officials, had recent talks with Israeli officials to try to create a diplomatic relation between the two nations a "clear lie".
- 14 July – The United States House of Representatives approved an amendment to the May 2022 NDAA Act, which permitted the US government to "further explore cooperation channels" within Somaliland. The Ministry of Foreign Affairs on Twitter thanked the US for amending their bill, stating "The Republic of Somaliland appreciates the action".
- 19 July – Information Minister Saleban Yusuf Ali Kore suspended the operations of the British Broadcasting Corporation (BBC) after accusing them of "undermining the credibility of the Somaliland state" and for "fail[ing] to recognise Somaliland as a democratic country that has stood on its feet for 30 years". Kore added the ban would go into effect immediately.
- 23 July
  - Police in Hargeisa raided the BBC Media Action office in the city and detained five staff members, according to Somali media defenders. They were shortly released from custody with the apology statement from the chairperson of the Human Rights Center in Somaliland Yasmin Omar Mohamoud, calling the detainment "unlawful," and that the nation is "sorry for what happened".
  - The 15th Hargeisa International Book Fair took place. The festival's country partner this year was Senegal, and the theme was "Solidarity" with the mission to bring the continent together through "culture, arts, and creativity".
- 25 July
  - The Somali Journalists Syndicate (SJS) and the Somali Media Association (SOMA) condemned the BBC Media Action office raid that took place on 23 July and also called on authorities to halt their threats and harassment against BBC staff and journalists, and for the nation to unconditionally allow the BBC to resume operations in the region.
  - Waddani party presidential candidate Abdirahman Mohamed Abdullahi held a press conference in Hargeisa where he spoke about the general situation of the nation, and that if President Abdi continued to try to postpone the upcoming presidential election, the Waddani party would continue to hold rallies until changes were made.
- 25 July–3 August – A delegation of six high-ranking government officials visited Namibia for their first time this week as the guests of the Cheetah Conservation Fund (CCF) to discuss the potential link between wildlife conservation and tourism within the nation.
- 26 July – The British Office in Hargeisa released their yearly International Programme Fund (IPF), in which financial rewards would be gifted to the nation if there was proof that the government had taken steps towards meeting Britain's goals for the nation, in which "partnerships to support women and girls" and "media freedom" were the aim.

=== August ===
- 2 August – A military delegation from Ethiopia led by the head of the Ethiopian National Defense Force (ENDF) Lieutenant General Birhanu Bekele, arrived in Hargeisa. According to the ENDF, cooperation between the two nations and security and safety, especially against Al-Shabaab, was "discussed in detail with the Somaliland President, the Chief of Staff of the armed forces, and the Director of the National Security".
- 8 August – PM Barre of Somalia released a 41-page action plan for his tenure in office which included continuing independence talks with Somaliland. Barre did state though that the unity of the Somali country is essential and must be maintained.
- 11 August (partially 12 August)
  - Five people were killed and more than 100 injured in widespread protests in the cities of Hargeisa, Burao, and Erigavo after negotiations between the government and opposition parties broke down, with the latter accusing President Abdi and his officials of purposely finding ways to delay the upcoming 13 November election. According to the nation's Deputy Police Commander Abdi Hassan Mire, the protesters were armed with "knives, catapults, clubs," and guns, as well as carried placards which said "Hold the election on 13th November 2022" and chanted anti-government slogans.
  - A statement condemning the "excessive use of force" used by authorities to extinguish the anti-government protests was signed by the EU, UK, and US, which also called for "all sides in Somaliland to engage in constructive dialogue in order to reach consensus on a roadmap for elections".
  - Internet in the nation reportedly received "significant disruptions across multiple providers," according to internet monitoring organization NetBlocks in wake on the protests, hampering up-to-date reporting of the protests as they unfolded.
- 13 August
  - President Abdi addressed the nation on national TV about the protests that were held the day before. He announced that 5 people had been killed in the protests, and claimed that the protests were ultimately organized by the leaders of Wadani and UCID parties after "learning from" the recent Sri Lanka protests in which "protesters forced their leaders out of office".
  - President Mohamud of Somalia in a short video published by the president's office, called on the nation's political parties to resolve their differences through dialogue rather than through violent protests.
- 14 August
  - Chairman of the opposition Waddani party Hirsi Ali Haji Hassan announced the protests, which killed five and injured 100 on mainly 11 August, "will continue [again] and we will not stop". He added the reason for the break in protests on 12 and 13 August was "to visit the wounded, find out about the arrested, and attend the funeral of the buried". According to the BBC, attempts to mediate the conflict between the ruling and opposition parties have largely failed.
  - The Waddani and UCID opposition parties jointly appointed a committee consisting of nine members, four of whom were members of the House of Representatives, to investigate the recent violent protests and any crimes they may have been committed during them.
- 15 August – A trial was held at a regional court for several demonstrators, including Horyaal 24 TV reporters Ahmed-Zaki and Abdinasir, who were arrested during the 11 August protests for their participation in the event.
- 17 August
  - The CPJ demands the unconditional release of Horyaal 24 TV reporter Ahmed-Zaki Ibrahim Mohamood and his cameraman Abdinasir Abdi Nour from Mandera Prison after they were arrested during the 11 August protests and sent to prison after being put on a reportedly unfair trial on 15 August.
  - The Ghana Institute of Management and Public Administration (GIMPA) announced a new training program targeting senior officials from the nation to "enhance their knowledge in civil service practice". According to Professor Samuel Kwaku Bonsu of the institute, the program deal had been in the works since 2020.
- 18 August – The Somaliland Strategic Advisory Group (SL-SAG) announced their concern for the current political situation in the nation, followed by releasing three recommendations aimed toward the nation's political parties, stakeholders, and citizens to work together to "protect peace and stability".
- 22 August – A delegation consisting of seven members from the Civil Service Institute (CSI) traveled to Ghana on a "familiarization visit" to the nation's parliament to strengthen ties between the CSI and its Ghana counterpart, and to organize more collaboration between the two nations going forward.
- 24 August – Another day of protests took place in Erigavo, where demonstrators took to the streets to demand that the presidential elections should take place on time on 13 November. Streets were reportedly blocked as some burned tires and other objects in the roadways before police arrived.
- 25 August – The US Biden Administration released its new African Stagey Plan, which similar to the Obama administration, focuses primarily on sub-saharan africa rather than the continent as a whole, leaving out any mention of Somaliland despite growing Somaliland–US relations.
- 25–31 August – Worsening drought conditions were reported via Radio Ergo in the Togdheer, Sanag, and Sool regions of the country, with calls for additional water, livestock fodder, and food being requested.
- 29 August – Minister of Foreign Affairs Essa Kayd suspended the Director-General Mohamed Abdullahi Duale from his official duties, accusing Duale of insubordination and derelecting his duties in a strongly worded letter pending presidential approval.

=== September ===
24 September – The National Electoral Commission announced that the presidential election initially scheduled for November 13, 2022 has been postponed to July 2023.

=== October ===
1 October – The upper house of the parliament of Somaliland, known as the Guurti voted on October 1, 2022 to postpose the election by two years instead of the nine months previously recommended by the National Electoral Commission, effectively scheduling the election for November 2024.

== Deaths ==
- 18 August – Mohamed Ibrahim Warsame "Hadrawi", 79, author and poet.

== See also ==
- COVID-19 pandemic in Africa
- Al-Shabaab (militant group)
- 2022 in Somalia
- 2022 in East Africa
