= 2020 in Somaliland =

- Decades: 2000s; 2010s; 2020s
- See also: History of Somaliland; List of years in Somaliland

Events of 2020 in Somaliland.

== Incumbents ==
- President: Muse Bihi Abdi
- Vice President: Abdirahman Saylici
- Speaker of the House: Bashe Mohamed Farah
- Chairman of Elders: Suleiman Mohamoud Adan
- Chief Justice: Adan Haji Ali
- Chief of Staff of Armed Forces: Nuh Ismail Tani
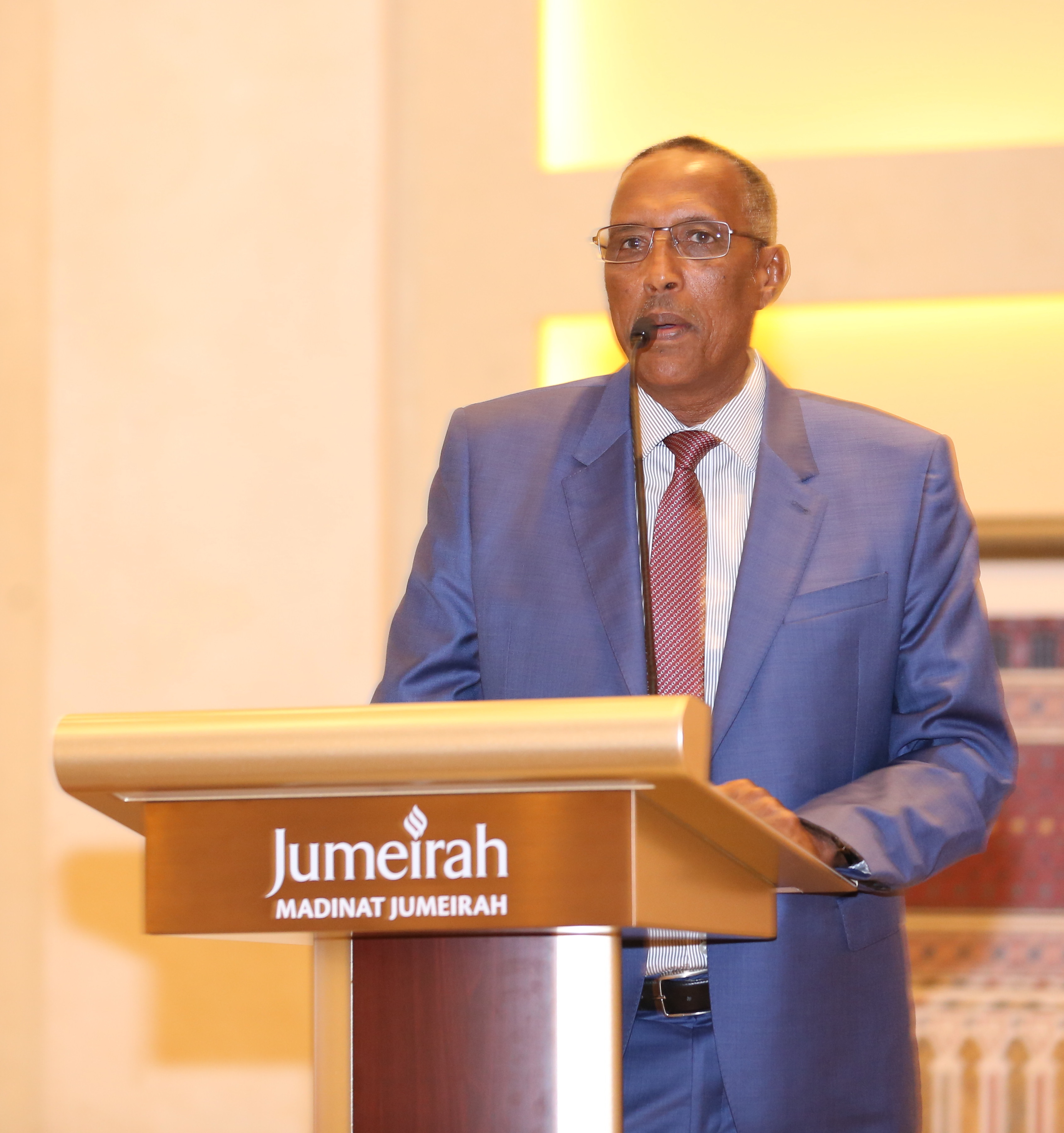
Muse Bihi Abdi

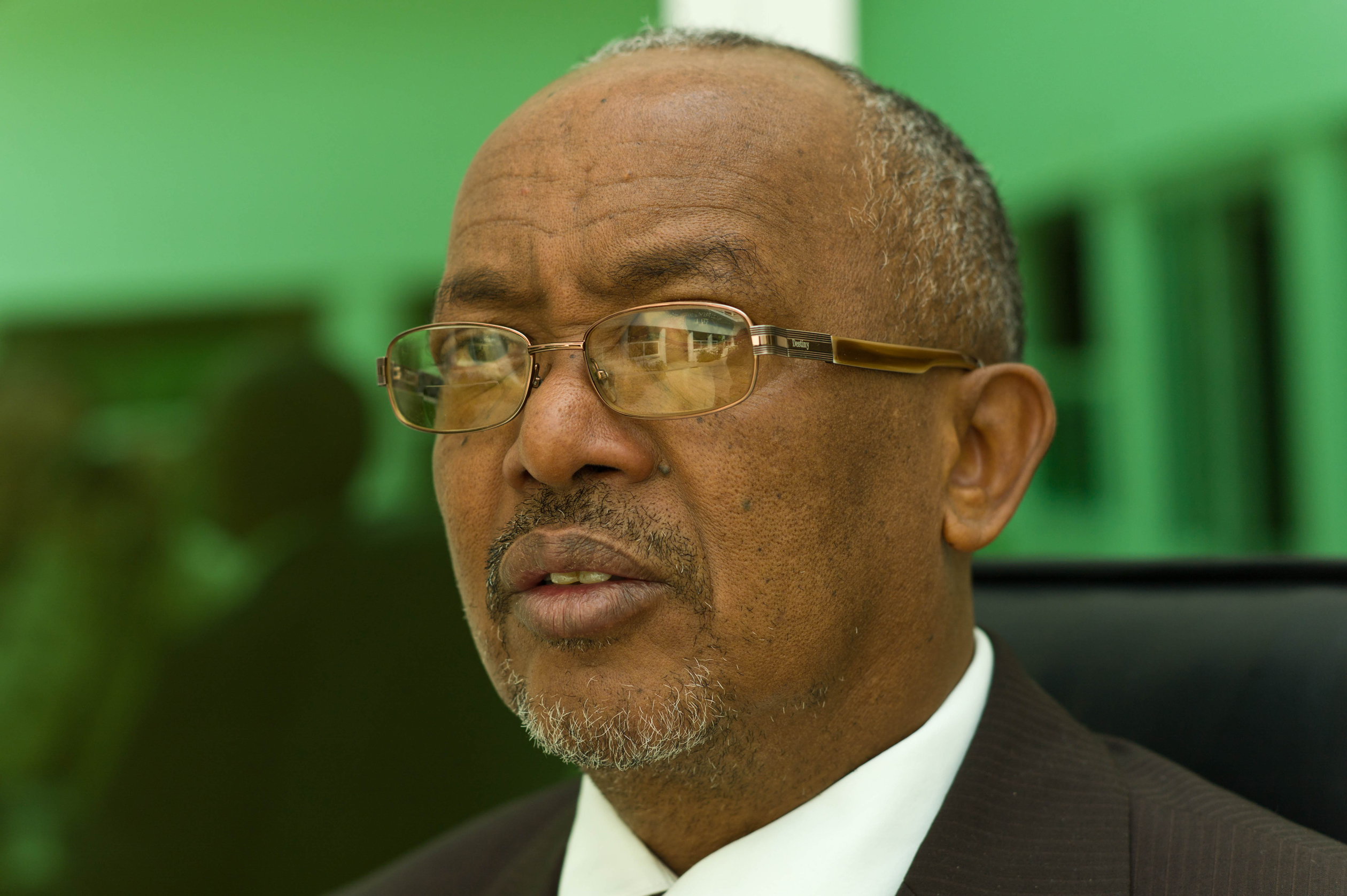
Abdirahman Saylici

== Events ==
=== January ===
- January 2
  - Minister of Endowment and Religious Affairs announced the nation-level committee of Anti-FGM.
- January 5
  - Culvert facilities that worth US$ 983,000 for construction of Burao -Erigavo Road arrive at Berbera Port.
- January 30
  - European Union and Ministry of Planning sign €7.5 Million deal for Berbera Urban Development Project.

=== February ===
- February 2
  - A commemoration ceremony of the 26th Anniversary of Somaliland Armed Forces held in national army command complex of Hargeisa.
- February 8
  - Chairman of Chamber of Commerce and Minister of Commerce has traveled and welcomed in Netherlands.
- February 18
  - President of Somaliland addressed the annual nation state at joint session of Parliament of Somaliland in Hargeisa.

=== March ===
- March 2
  - Chairman of Sool Regional Court killed in an explosion attached to his car in Las Anod.
- March 10
  - Two children died after a house fire at Mohamoud Haibe district in Hargeisa.
  - Yasin Haji Mohamoud foreign minister of Somaliland visited Uganda to boost bilateral relations.
- March 14
  - House of Representatives is introduced for Sex and Rape Act to debate and discuss.
  - House of Elders is introduced for House of Representatives Elections Act to debate and discuss.
- March 17
  - COVID-19 in Somaliland – President Bihi announces on closing schools across the country and banning all public gatherings, including sports events and festivals for 4 Weeks, effective midnight (EAT) on March 19. He also mentioned the suspend of flights from eight countries including China, Somalia, Kenya, Italy, Iran, France, South Korea and Spain.
- March 25
  - COVID-19 in Somaliland – Somaliland's Committee of Preparation and Prevention of the Coronavirus announced that land borders with Ethiopia, Djibouti and Somalia are closed for 3 weeks, and the only things that can cross the borders is necessary goods including Food, Fuel and Medicines.
- March 31
  - COVID-19 in Somaliland – The first two cases of coronavirus in Somaliland are confirmed.

=== April ===
- April 1
  - COVID-19 in Somaliland – Muse Bihi orders the state Attorney General starting from Wednesday to release 574 inmates through Somaliland territories in a presidential decree due to coronavirus fears.

=== November ===
- November 14
  - A mine explosion in Balidhiig, Togdheer region, hits a school bus, killing one person and injuring two.

=== December ===
- December 15
  - Somalia cuts diplomatic ties with Kenya after president Muse Bihi Abdi visits the country.

== Deaths ==
=== January ===
- January 6
  - Adan Ahmed Warsame – politician (born 1948)
- January 10
  - Ahmed Keyse Dualeh – politician and diplomat (born 1922)

=== April ===
- April 2
  - Abdirizak Mohamed Toor – politician
  - Yasin Ali Abdi – politician

== See also ==
- 2020 in East Africa
- COVID-19 pandemic in Africa
