= 2021 in Somaliland =

- Decades: 2000s; 2010s; 2020s
- See also: History of Somaliland; List of years in Somaliland

Events in the year 2021 in Somaliland.

== Incumbents ==
- President: Muse Bihi Abdi
- Vice President: Abdirahman Saylici
- Speaker of the House: Bashe Mohamed Farah
- Chairman of Elders: Suleiman Mohamoud Adan
- Chief Justice: Adan Haji Ali
- Minister of Foreign Affairs: Essa Kayd
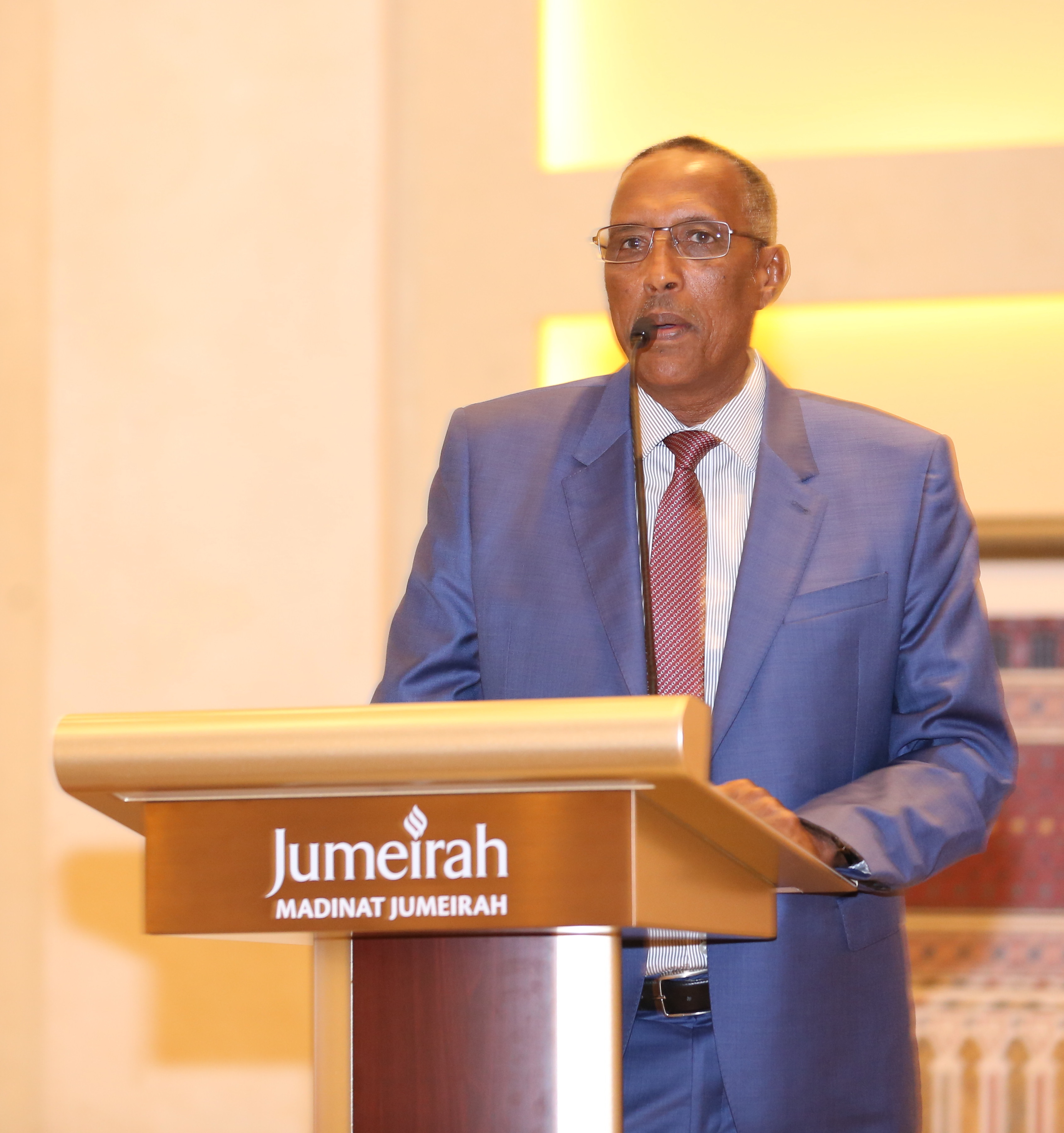
Muse Bihi Abdi

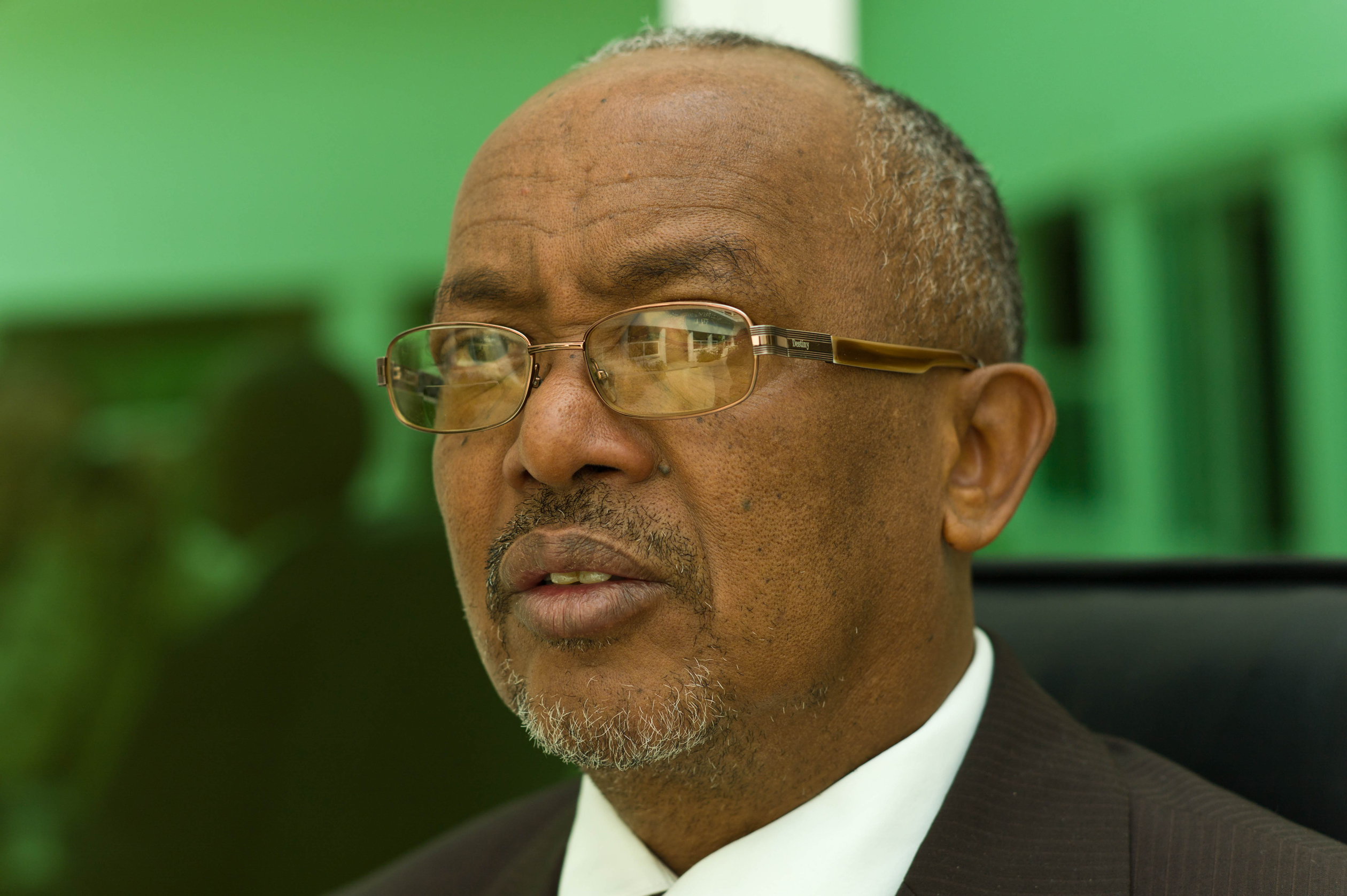
Abdirahman Saylici

== Events ==
Ongoing – COVID-19 pandemic in Somaliland

=== February ===
- February 12 – Mahamed Abdiqadir, the 8th Grand Sultan of the Isaaq Sultanate passes away in Hargeisa. His death is mourned by the United Kingdom.
- February 24 – Taiwan donates $2 million to support the organization of the upcoming pro-democracy and electoral elections in May, according to Abdikadir Jirdeh, a senior member of the Waddani party, in a speech.
- February 27 – Somaliland authorities release Ethiopian Mohamed Muse Gamteesa after being stuck in prison for 20 years due to technicalities. He was arrested back in 2001 for a murder case.

=== March ===
- March 13 – The United Arab Emirates (UAE) sends envoy Abdulla Alnaqbi to Hargeisa to become the first UAE representative to Somaliland. "Somaliland and the United Arab Emirates share strategic partnership, friendship, and common values. H.E. Abdulla's nomination will cement and take this partnership to the next level," according to a statement made by President Abdi on Twitter. This comes as UAE-Somali relations recently become strained.

=== April ===
- April 15 – Somaliland Ministry of Foreign Affairs says it is "gravely concerned" about the "oppressive" and "tyrannical" move by "our neighboring country" Somalia's President Mohamed signing a Special Electoral Law which extends his term as president for two more years. Officials call for the United Nations (UN) and other stakeholders to directly engage in finding a solution for Somalia's troubled elections and fighting terrorism.
- April 29 – President Abdi blames Somali President Mohamed for "promoting" the hostilities leading up to the 2021 Mogadishu mutiny, and the governments "refusal to listen to the people".

=== May ===
- May
  - Five opposition candidates are arrested in the run-up to the vote. In some parts of the country, journalists are harassed and arrested, and media houses shut down.
  - Taiwan’s democratic development fund donates $2 million to make the elections in Somaliland happen.
- May 18 – The streets of Hargeisa are crowded with thousands of people taking to the streets to celebrate the 30 year independence of the country.
- May 31
  - The 2021 Somaliland parliamentary election takes place with more than a million people voting. The Justice and Welfare Party (UCID) added its 21 seats to the 31 seats secured by Somaliland National Party (Waddani), to oust the ruling Peace, Unity, and Development Party (Kulmiye).
  - The 2021 Somaliland municipal elections also take place, with Kulmiye winning with 93 of the 220 seats, but losing six seats to Waddani, which gained eleven seats, now holding 79.

=== June ===
- June 7 – The now-ruling Kulmiye party opposes the alliance between the Waddani and UCID opposition parties. This comes after the two parties proposed to "team up" to elect the Speaker of the House and various mayors in the region.
- June 8 – The United Nations Human Rights Council alleges Somali recruits were trained in Eritrea to fight in the Tigray War. This would constitute as illegally participating in a foreign war. It is not clear if this includes fighters from Somaliland, but is entirely possible.
- June 24 – Berbera Port opens a new terminal which increases the ports annual capacity of 150,000 containers to 500,000 containers. The terminal also broadens a trade corridor between Somaliland and Ethiopia, which also has a large Somali community, and sent a high-level delegation to the opening.
- June 25 – DP World invests at least $442 million in Somaliland to try to fund further extending of the recently upgraded Berbera Port. This includes extending the new quay from 400 to 1000 meters, installing a further Ship-to-shore (STS) gantry cranes from 3 to 10, enabling the port to handle up to 2 million TEU's a year and multiple large container vessels at the same time.

=== July ===
- July 18 – At an event in Hargeisa, a new alliance announced ex-UCID party members will run for the first and second speakers respectively in a new arrangement by the Kulmiye party.

=== August ===
- August – Journalist Abdilmalik Muse Oldon is arrested over Facebook comments about Abaarso School of Science and Technology and Barwaaqo University reportally promoting Christianity.
- August 3 – Parliament elects new Speaker of the House Abdirizak Khalif from the Waddani party, in a 42 to 39 vote against Yasin Faraton from the Kulmiye party. The election is preceded by the oath taking of the recently elected MP's from 31 May.
- August 29 – Somaliland and Puntland welcome 300 Yemenis fleeing war as violence escalates in the Arabian Peninsula, according to the UN.

=== September ===
- September 1 – President Abdi comes under pressure to pardon journalist Abdilmalik Muse Oldon after he is sent to Mandera Prison without trial for comments on Facebook he made in August. Somaliland's Minister of Religious Affairs Sheikh Khalil commented that "President Muse Bihi Abdi vowed to protect the Islamic religion and take its interests to heart, and that Oldon case resides with the supreme court".
- September 2 – The Kenyan Ministry of Foreign Affairs sends a team of four officers to Hargeisa, representing Kenyan interests in the nation and to discuss the possible opening of a liaison office.
- September 7 – Kenya officially opens a liaison office within Somaliland.
- September 13 – A large spike in murders targeting civilians takes place in Las Anod, "and no one was arrested for a single murder," according to a local cleric in the town. Key figures including Muslim clerics, journalists, politicians, elders, business people, and activists have all been targets. Mayor Abdirahman Ali Ismail said investigations are ongoing and that culprits would be subjected to "the full force of the law".
- September 14 – Police and wildlife authorities arrest a man attempting to board a plane who was attempting to illegally smuggle over 200 lizards to Egypt. "It is illegal to export Somaliland's wildlife because they [can] become extinct," according to communication officer Gelle Hassan. It is currently unclear the motive behind the attempted smuggling.

=== October ===
- Since October 2 – The United Nations Humanitarian Agency (OCHA) estimates that 7,250 people have been evicted from Las Anod because of "security threat" claims. The OCHA investigations indicate that the families were more likely evicted because of business rivalries between northerners and southerners. OCHA further stated that 24 families had been relocated to villages in the Buhoodle District, and another 400 families were just informed to leave Erigavo by 21 October without food, water, and medicine. This is strongly refuted by President Abdi.
- October 5 – The UN says it is aware of more evictions taking place by the Somaliland government in Las Anod and urges for the respect of human rights.
- October 6 – In a statement by Somaliland's Ministry of Foreign Affairs, Somalia is told to "keep off from our internal affairs," after contacting Somaliland in response to the OCHA Las Anod eviction investigation.
- October 18 – President Abdi publicly disagrees with the OCHA's findings over the Las Anod's eviction investigation, standing by Las Anod's claim that the people evicted were "security threats," going as far to say that OCHA was being "hypocritical and dishonest".
- October 19 – US Senior Policy Analyst Joshua Meservey publishes a paper advocating for the recognition of Somaliland.
- October 24 – Las Anod police arrest Abdifatah Mohamed Abdi, a reporter with Holhol Media, for reporting critically on the administration of Sool and Las Anod.

=== November ===
- Early November – Controversial Holhol Media reporter Abdifatah Mohamed Abdi is released from jail.
- November 16 – Abdirahman Mohamed Abdullahi, leader of the Waddani opposition party, calls for the reevaluation of the nations ties with Taiwan, and calls for closer ties with China. "It is necessary for Somaliland's recognition to find a government that is a member of the United Nations Security Council with veto power," Abdullahi said in a statement.
- November 18 – The United Kingdom announces that it will not recognize Somaliland as an independent state unless Somaliland, Somalia, and other African nations deliberate first.
- November 28 – Ethiopia's Somali Region President Mustafa Mohammed Omar arrives in Hargeisa at the presidential palace to discuss with President Abdi about a number of issues including security and the Tigray War, in which Somaliland is currently unaligned. According to the FBC, President Abdi expressed support for the Ethiopian government's military campaign, while former Somaliland ambassador and Head of Trade Hassan Yasin says the opposite.

=== December ===
- December 12 – A bill allowing for the registration of new political parties ahead of an upcoming presidential election, tabled by information minister Saleban Ali Koore, is opposed by the opposition parties Waddani and UCID party officials.
- December 13 – A rare brawl breaks out in parliament between rival politicians with the announcement that President Abdi's administration will continue with the registration of new political parties within the currently three party nation.
- December 15 – A delegation of US congressional staff, mostly members of the Foreign Relations Committee meet at the Presidential Palace in Hargeisa to discuss "profoundly... US-Somaliland relationships, stability, development, vibrant democracies, and elections," according to post by President Abdi on Twitter.
- December 26 – Police in Las Anod arrest Abdifatah Mohamed Abdi again, as well as Sakaria Ahmed Muhumed, chairperson of the Somaliland Journalists Association (SOLJA), a local press rights group.
- December 30 – Police in Las Anod arrested another two other journalists—Hamse Abdi Ahmed, a freelancer, and Abdikhadar Farah Abshir, a Universal TV reporter.
- December 31 – The Committee to Protect Journalists calls on Somaliland authorities to unconditionally release the three journalists detained for reporting critically on the administration of the Sool region.

== Deaths ==
- February 12 – Mahamed Abdiqadir, Grand Sultan of Isaaq.

== See also ==
- COVID-19 pandemic in Africa
- Al-Shabaab (militant group)
- 2021 in Somalia
- 2021 in East Africa
