= 2027 in Somaliland =

- Decades: 2000s; 2010s; 2020s
- See also: History of Somaliland; List of years in Somaliland

Events in the year 2027 in Somaliland.

== Events ==
=== Planned or predicted ===
- 2027 Somaliland parliamentary election
