= 2025 in Somaliland =

- Decades: 2000s; 2010s; 2020s
- See also: History of Somaliland; List of years in Somaliland

Events in the year 2025 in Somaliland.

== Incumbents ==
- President: Abdirahman Mohamed Abdullahi
- Vice President: Mohamed Aw-Ali Abdi
- Speaker of the House: Yasin Haji Mohamoud
- Chairman of Elders: Suleiman Mohamoud Adan
- Chief Justice: Adan Haji Ali
- Minister of Foreign Affairs: Abdirahman Dahir Adam

== Events ==
- 14 April – The United States is offered a naval base in Berbera.
- 14 August – Ten cheetah cubs held by poachers to be traded illegally overseas are rescued in Salahlay District.
- 26 December – Israel becomes the first country to formally recognize Somaliland as an independent nation.

== Holidays ==
- 1 January – New Year's Day
- 31 March – Eid al-Fitr
- 1 May – Labour Day
- 18 May – Somaliland Declaration of Independence
- 7 – 8 June – Eid al-Adha
- 26 June – Independence Day
- 27 June – Islamic New Year
- 7 July – Ashura
- 5 September – The Prophet's Birthday

== See also ==
- Al-Shabaab (militant group)
- 2025 in Somalia
