= 2023 in Somaliland =

- Decades: 2000s; 2010s; 2020s
- See also: History of Somaliland; List of years in Somaliland

Events in the year 2023 in Somaliland.

== Incumbents ==
- President: Muse Bihi Abdi
- Vice President: Abdirahman Saylici
- Speaker of the House: Abdirisak Khalif
- Chairman of Elders: Suleiman Mohamoud Adan
- Chief Justice: Adan Haji Ali
- Minister of Foreign Affairs: Essa Kayd

== Events ==
Ongoing – Somali Civil War (2009–present); COVID-19 pandemic in Somaliland

=== January ===
- 2 January – Protests continue for a fifth day in Las Anod, Somaliland, with protesters demanding that the city be governed by Puntland instead of by Somaliland. Twenty people are killed in clashes between protestors and security forces.
- 6 February – At least 34 people are killed after clashes occur in Laascaanood, Sool.

== See also ==
- COVID-19 pandemic in Africa
- Al-Shabaab (militant group)
- 2023 in Somalia
- 2023 in East Africa
