= 2017 Somaliland presidential election =

- 13 November 2017
- Turnout: 80.32%
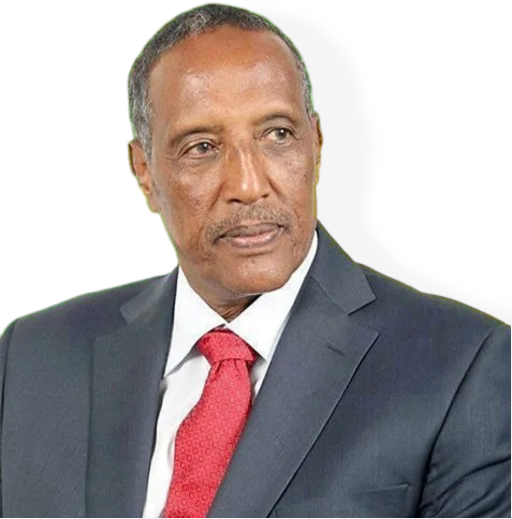

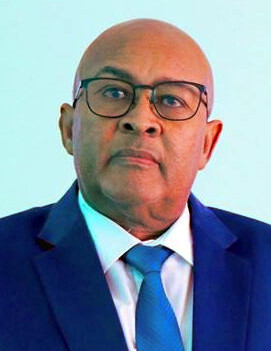
Nominee	Muse Bihi Abdi	Abdirahman Mohamed Abdullahi
Party	Kulmiye	Waddani
Running mate	Abdirahman Saylici	Mohamed Aw-Ali Abdi
Popular vote	305,909	226,092
Percentage	55.10%	40.73%
President before election
Ahmed Mohamed Mohamoud
Kulmiye
Elected President
Muse Bihi Abdi
Kulmiye

Presidential elections were held in Somaliland on 13 November 2017, the third direct presidential election since 2003. General elections had been scheduled to be held in Somaliland on 27 March 2017 to elect both the President and House of Representatives, but were initially postponed by six months due to the drought condition in the region. The elections to elect the President and Vice President were eventually held separately on 13 November. Incumbent President Ahmed Mohamed Mohamoud of the Peace, Unity, and Development Party (Kulmiye) did not run for a second term.

The result was a victory for ruling Kulmiye party candidate Muse Bihi Abdi, who received 55% of the vote.

== Background ==
Parliamentary elections were due originally to be held in Somaliland in September 2010, and were eventually scheduled for 26 June 2015 alongside the presidential elections, but due to the unpreparedness of the National Elections Committee the Guurti extended the incumbent's term for a period of 21 months in early September 2015.

== Candidates ==
In November 2015 Kulmiye party chairman Muse Bihi Abdi was selected as the presidential candidate for the ruling Peace, Unity, and Development Party. Former long-time House Speaker Abdirahman Mohamed Abdullahi, also known as Irro, was chosen as the candidate for the Waddani Party.

The candidate for the Justice and Development was Faysal Ali Warabe, who had unsuccessfully contested the two previous presidential elections. Warabe became the party's candidate after a long legal and political challenge between Warabe and the party's original presidential candidate Jamal Ali Hussein; Hussein later joined Kulmiye. Warabe's running mate was Abdi Ahmed Musa Abyan.

== Conduct ==
Sixty international observers from over 27 countries were deployed across Somaliland to observe the elections. Seventeen of the 21 districts in Somaliland were visited by observers, with 335 of the 1,624 polling stations attended. The report by the Development Planning Unit of University College London concluded that "Throughout the election period, Somalilanders demonstrated their support for the rule of law and constitutional process, voting peacefully and in significant numbers and the mission applauds this ongoing commitment to peaceful participation in an impressively open electoral system."

== Results ==
On 21 November the NEC announced that Muse Bihi Abdi of the ruling Kulmiye party received 55% of the vote to emerge as the winner. His closest contender was Abdirahman Irro of the Waddani party who received 41% with Faysal Ali Warabe finishing last with 4%.

Candidate	Running mate	Party	Votes	%
Muse Bihi Abdi	Abdirahman Saylici	Peace, Unity, and Development Party	305,909	55.10
Abdirahman Mohamed Abdullahi	Mohamed Aw-Ali Abdi	Waddani	226,092	40.73
Faysal Ali Warabe	Abdi Ahmed Musa Abyan	For Justice and Development	23,141	4.17
Total			555,142	100.00
Valid votes			555,142	98.15
Invalid/blank votes			10,475	1.85
Total votes			565,617	100.00
Registered voters/turnout			704,198	80.32
Source: SLNEC

=== By region ===
Region	Bihi		Abdullahi		Warabe		Invalid votes	Total	Registered voters	Turnout
Region	Votes	%	Votes	%	Votes	%	Invalid votes	Total	Registered voters	Turnout
Awdal	38,454	48.05	40,959	51.18	617	0.77	1,406	81,436	102,571	79.39
Marodi-jeex	130,334	61.12	63,127	29.60	19,795	9.28	3,974	217,230	249,229	87.16
Sanaag	26,732	47.69	28,777	51.33	550	0.98	1,422	57,481	80,443	71.46
Saaxil	31,183	64.77	16,399	34.06	563	1.17	390	48,535	60,817	79.80
Sool	21,707	54.93	17,426	44.10	383	0.97	782	40,298	63,698	63.26
Togdheer	57,499	48.67	59,404	50.28	1,233	1.04	2,501	120,637	147,440	81.82
Total	305,909	55.10	226,092	40.73	23,141	4.17	10,475	565,617	704,198	80.32
Source: SLNEC

=== By district ===
Legend
Kulmiye victory	Waddani victory

#	Region	District	KULMIYE		Waddani		UCID		Total votes		Margin	
#	Region	District	Votes	%	Votes	%	Votes	%	Votes	%	Votes	%
1	Awdal	Zeila	6,099	63.8%	3,398	35.5%	66	0.7%	9,563	1.5%	2,701	28.2%
2	Awdal	Lughaya	6,413	84.2%	1,137	14.9%	65	0.9%	7,615	1.2%	5,276	69.3%
3	Awdal	Boorame	20,817	40.0%	30,833	59.2%	424	0.8%	52,074	8.0%	-10,016	-19.2%
4	Awdal	Baki	5,125	47.6%	5,591	51.9%	62	0.6%	10,778	1.7%	-466	-4.3%
5	Maroodi-Jeex	Gabiley	37,840	92.5%	2,731	6.7%	339	0.8%	40,910	6.3%	35,109	85.8%
6	Maroodi-Jeex	Hargeysa	86,024	55.4%	54,013	34.8%	15,342	9.9%	155,379	24.0%	32,011	20.6%
7	Maroodi-Jeex	Bali-gubedle	5,109	58.9%	3,474	40.0%	96	1.1%	8,679	1.3%	1,635	18.8%
8	Maroodi-Jeex	Salaxley	1,361	16.4%	2,909	35.1%	4,018	48.5%	8,288	1.3%	-1,548	-18.7%
9	Saaxil	Berbara	25,179	68.8%	10,927	29.9%	485	1.3%	36,591	5.6%	14,252	38.9%
10	Saaxil	Sheekh	6,004	52.0%	5,472	47.4%	78	0.7%	11,554	1.8%	532	4.6%
11	Togdheer	Burco	51,626	54.2%	42,643	44.8%	973	1.0%	95,242	14.7%	8,983	9.4%
12	Togdheer	Oodweyne	1,767	10.0%	15,792	89.0%	186	1.0%	17,745	2.7%	-14,025	-79.0%
13	Togdheer	Buuhoodle	4,106	79.7%	969	18.8%	74	1.4%	5,149	0.8%	3,137	60.9%
14	Sool	Caynabo	14,573	72.0%	5,494	27.1%	179	0.9%	20,246	3.1%	9,079	44.8%
15	Sool	Laascaanood	5,060	35.9%	8,865	62.9%	158	1.1%	14,083	2.2%	-3,805	-27.0%
16	Sool	Xudun	781	27.2%	2,069	72.0%	23	0.8%	2,873	0.4%	-1,288	-44.8%
17	Sool	Taleex	1,293	55.9%	998	43.1%	23	1.0%	2,314	0.4%	295	12.7%
18	Sanaag	Gar'adag	7,331	82.6%	1,396	15.7%	145	1.6%	8,872	1.4%	5,935	66.9%
19	Sanaag	Ceel-afweyn	8,179	66.0%	4,064	32.8%	149	1.2%	12,392	1.9%	4,115	33.2%
20	Sanaag	Ceerigaabo	10,599	32.1%	22,207	67.2%	243	0.7%	33,049	5.1%	-11,608	-35.1%
21	Sanaag	Badhan	623	35.7%	1,110	63.6%	13	0.7%	1,746	0.3%	-487	-27.9%
22	Sanaag	Dhahar	0	0.0%	0	0.0%	0	0.0%	0	0.0%	0	0.0%
	Total		305,909	55.1%	226,092	40.7%	23,141	4.2%	555,142	85.7%	79,817	14.4%
Source: SLNEC

== Aftermath ==
Abdi was inaugurated as president on 13 December 2017 in Hargeisa.
