= Jamal Ali Hussein =

- Jamaal Cali Xuseen
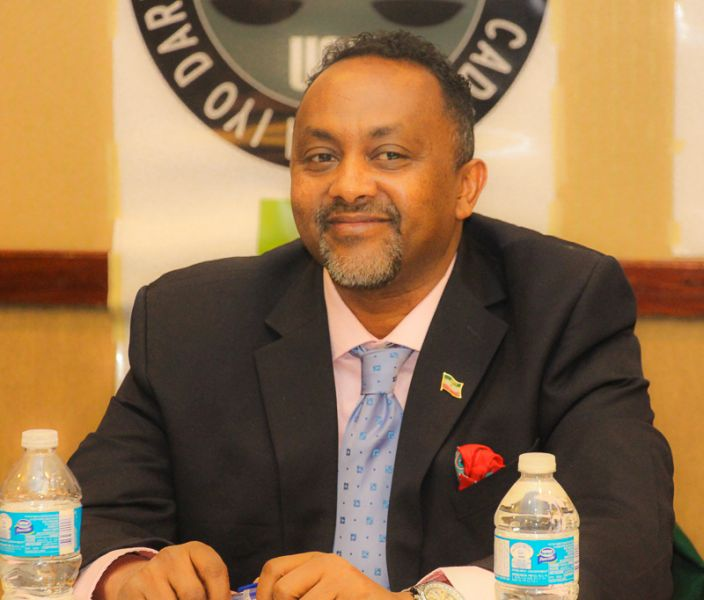
- Born: 1965 (age 60–61); Hargeisa
- Occupations: Banker, politician

Jamal Ali Hussein (Somali: Jamaal Cali Xuseen) is a former presidential candidate for the Somaliland political party UCID.

== Biography ==
=== Education ===
In 1965, Jamal was born in Hargeisa, in the Somali Democratic Republic, as the son of General Ali Hussein. He began his elementary education in Sheikh, but moved due to his father's job transfers, and lived in Beledweyne, Galkayo, Garoowe, Dusmareb, and Mogadishu. He finished his secondary education in Hargeisa, attending Faraa Umar Secondary School, Sheikh Ibrahim Sheikh Madar Secondary School, and Sheikh High School. He played tennis in the 1980s. He won the men's singles title at the national inter-regional tournament in Somalia three years in a row. In 1982, when he was a senior in high school, he took part in a student stone-throwing protest that began as a demonstration against the unjust imprisonment carried out by the then-Siad Barre regime.

Jamal was admitted to Harvard University in the United States. During his second year, he won a fellowship awarded to one student from a developing country. He also participated in university competitions and was elected treasurer of the African American Student Association.

Jamal majored in accounting and business administration at the School of Public Administration (SIDAM) in Mogadishu and earned a Bachelor of Science (BSc) degree with honors. At the age of 21, he was hired as an accounting instructor at SIDAM.

=== Early career ===
From 1989 to 1991, Jamal was in charge of investments at State Street Bank in the United States. From 1991 to 1995, he worked at PricewaterhouseCoopers, an international auditing firm.

He majored in tax and business law at Bentley University in the United States, earned a degree in accounting in 1994, and got a Certified Public Accountant in Massachusetts.

=== Citibank ===
He subsequently joined Citibank and worked in many countries, including the United States, the United Kingdom, Indonesia, Poland, Saudi Arabia, Kenya, Mexico, Ivory Coast, The Bahamas, Ireland, Trinidad and Tobago and Turkey. In October 2010, he was appointed Managing Director and CEO of Citibank Tanzania.

=== Presidential candidate of Somaliland ===
In June 2011, he flew from Tanzania to Hargeisa, where he was welcomed by youth organizations in Somaliland and others. The purpose of this visit was to accept an invitation from young intellectuals. In late 2011, he joined the United Peoples' Democratic Party (UDUB). It was reported that he did so in order to run for president. He arrived in Hargeisa in December. In January 2012, he was selected as the presidential candidate by the UDUB leadership. However, this did not reflect the consensus of the UDUB, and when former President Dahir Riyale Kahin voiced his opposition, the UDUB split into two factions.

In July 2012, Jamal left the UDUB and joined the Justice and Welfare Party (UCID). In November 2016, within the opposition UCID, he and party leader Faysal Ali Warabe were competing for the UCID's presidential nomination. He criticized the government's response, noting that while a rally for his faction scheduled to take place at a hotel had been banned, Faysal's meeting had not been. He held his rally outdoors under a tree.

In February 2017, Jamal led a faction of the UCID in joining the ruling Kulmiye Party. He stated, "My personal goal of leading the country is not that important," and called on people to support the candidate of the Kulmiye Party Muse Bihi Abdi. In November 2017, Muse Bihi Abdi became president of Somaliland. While some say Jamal's support was the key to the election victory, the president did not appoint him to the cabinet.

=== After that ===
Since the 2017 presidential election campaign, he has avoided speaking about politics except sometimes posting messages on social media. He has mainly resided in Hargeisa and worked for the Somaliland Ministry of Finance. One reason for his silence on political matters is suspected his consideration for President Muse Bihi Abdi, who belongs to a related clan.

He then earned a Master of Fine Arts (MFA) degree with a concentration in nonfiction writing from Southern New Hampshire University in the United States.

In September 2024, Jamal successfully defended his doctoral dissertation at the School of Advanced International Studies (SAIS) at Johns Hopkins University in the United States and was awarded his Ph.D.

== Works ==
- Jamal Ali Hussein (2011). Diiwaanka Qosolka [The Book of Laughter] (in Somali). Bashe Publications. p. 367. ISBN 978-0954767433.
