= 2024 in Somaliland =

- Decades: 2000s; 2010s; 2020s
- See also: History of Somaliland; List of years in Somaliland

Events in the year 2024 in Somaliland.

== Incumbents ==
- President:
  - Muse Bihi Abdi
  - Abdirahman Mohamed Abdullahi (from 12 December 2024)
- Vice President:
  - Abdirahman Saylici
  - Mohamed Aw-Ali Abdi (from 12 December 2024)
- Speaker of the House: Yasin Haji Mohamoud
- Chairman of Elders: Suleiman Mohamoud Adan
- Chief Justice: Adan Haji Ali
- Minister of Foreign Affairs: Essa Kayd

== Events ==
- January 1: Ethiopia announces an agreement with Somaliland to use 20 kilometers of coastline, including the port of Berbera, in exchange for eventual recognition of the Somaliland Declaration of Independence, which would make it the first UN member state to do so.
- August 28: At least nine people are killed in fighting between SSC-Khatumo forces and Somaliland soldiers near the town of Goof, close to Erigavo in the southeastern part of the Sanaag region.
- October 31-1 November: 2024 Buhodle clashes: Somaliland forces backed by SSB civil militia clash with SSC-Khatumo forces, leaving several dead.
- November 13: 2024 Somaliland presidential election: Incumbent president Muse Bihi Abdi loses reelection to Abdirahman Mohamed Abdullahi by a landslide.
- December 12: Abdirahman Mohamed Abdullahi is inaugurated as president.
- December 14–15: Battle of Erigavo: SSC-Khatumo launches a coordinated assault on Somaliland positions within Erigavo, which is repelled, with Somaliland forces maintaining control of the city.

== Deaths ==
- November 15: Ahmed Mohamed Mohamoud, 86, politician, president (2010–2017), minister of finance (1997–1999) and MP (1993–1996).

== See also ==
- 2024 in Somalia
- Al-Shabaab (militant group)
- COVID-19 pandemic in Africa
