= Waheen Market fire =

Somaliland Market Fire

2022 Waheen Market fire
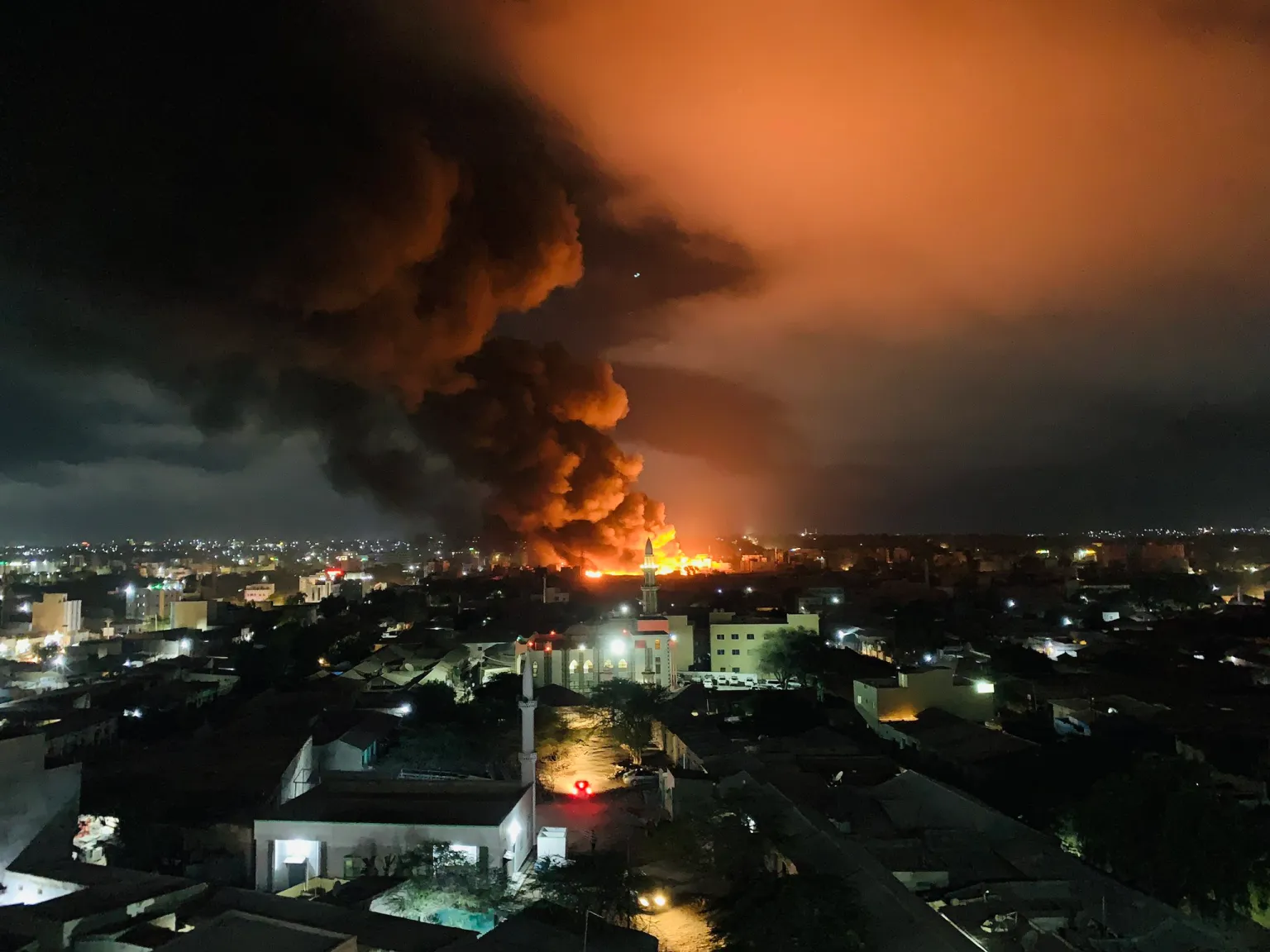
- The market fire on the night of 1 April.
- Date: 1 April 2022
- Time: 8:10 PM, 1 April – Dawn, 2 April
- Location: Waheen Market, Hargeisa, Somaliland; 9.5631725°N 44.0699626°E
- Also known as: Waheem, Waaheen, and Waaheem Market Fire
- Cause: Possible electrical malfunction
- Deaths: 0
- Injuries: 28
- Property damage: 2 Billion USD, >1 Trillion SLS

The 2022 Waheen Market fire was a fire that took place in Hargeisa in the self-proclaimed nation of Somaliland on 1 April 2022. While there were no deaths, damages from the fire amounted to around USD2 billion, or 60% of Somaliland's GDP.

== Lead up ==
Somaliland, along with the whole of the Horn of Africa, had been suffering from one of the worst droughts in decades, with Somaliland recording its driest season in 40 years. This led to an already sensitive food situation in the nation, as well as a lack of other commodities. On top of the inflation that began following the 2022 Russian Invasion of Ukraine, this disaster was especially devastating to the communities that relied on the market.

== Fire ==
The market fire began on the evening of 1 April at around 8:10 PM and was largely extinguished by the dawn of 2 April. The fire started possibly due to an electrical fault in an old warehouse in the market according to eyewitnesses, where the fire was quickly picked up by winds helping it to spread across the market. The fire took around 20 hours to extinguish, but even after this, small plumes of smoke were still prevalent across the market. Due to this, the clean-up operation would begin early 5 April, after allowing time for the traders to try to retrieve any property that survived.

While there were no deaths associated with the fire, 28 people were injured. The majority of those injured had gone into the fire attempting to salvage goods from their burning stalls.

== Response ==
The site of the Waheen Market fire was visited most notably by Dahabshiil CEO Abdirashid Duale, Hargeisa's Mayor Abdikarim Ahmed Mooge, and Somaliland President Muse Bihi Abdi, both on 2 April. The Somaliland government released $1 million shortly after the fire was extinguished to help with emergency response, and set up a five-member committee to lead the rescue operation and efforts to assist those affected.

According to Mayor Mooge, the fire could have been brought under control before causing such extensive damage, but the city's firefighters were hampered by access problems. With no proper streets and only narrow pathways crowded by locked stalls and traders trying to salvage their goods, there was no easy way to get the firetrucks to where the blaze was. The fire brigade in Hargeisa was also very small, only consisting of 28 firetrucks with only 24 being used in the fire because of the access problems mentioned, according to Somaliland's fire and rescue chief Ahmed Mohamed Hassan. "The town has never witnessed such a massive calamity," Mayor Mooge told reporters at the scene.

== Impact ==
The fire destroyed an area of about 99,000 m² (about 24 acres), destroying an estimated 2,000 to 5,000 businesses, affecting some 17,000 traders directly, including many migrant workers from Somalia, Kenya, and other parts of East Africa. Some historic buildings displaying Ottoman architecture were also destroyed in the blaze. The damages totaled an estimated USD1.5 billion to $2 billion, or 60% of the nations GDP. The market, also being an important trading hub with financial links to other parts of the world including the Middle East, China, Asia, and Europe, will likely cause long term economic damage to the nation as well.

== International support ==
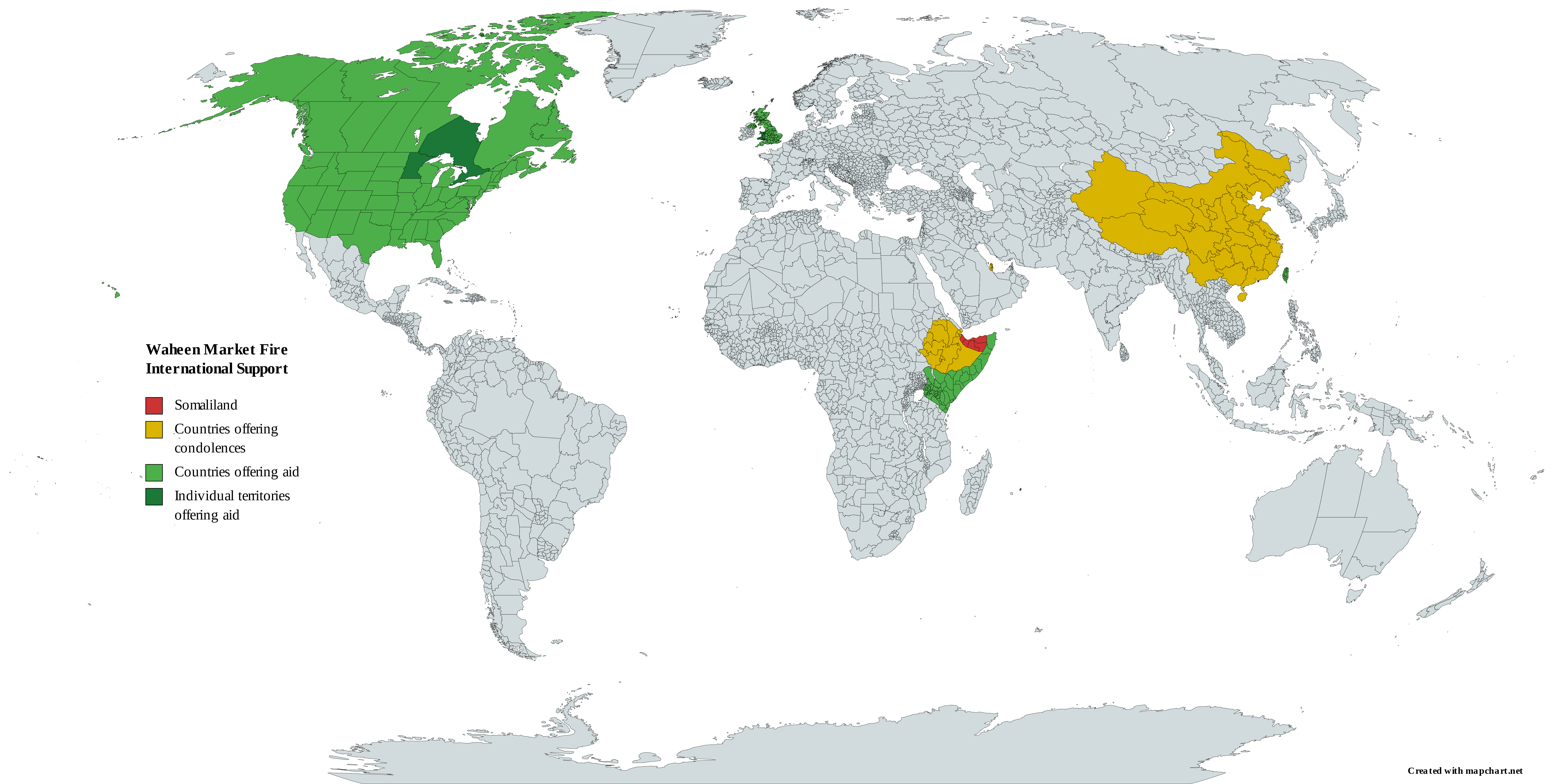
International support for Somaliland after the market fire, by country.

On 3 April, Somaliland officials launched an international appeal for USD2 billion to urgently deliver humanitarian support to the families and businesses affected by the fire. $2 billion was chosen as the amount as that was the estimated loss caused by the fire. In response to this call, multiple countries and cities from around the world showed their support by raising money and donating humanitarian aid.

=== Somalia ===
Somalia, being the internationally recognised government over the region by most countries, offered to send $11.7 million to Hargeisa to help those who were affected by the fire. This caused debate among politicians and the affected families if they should accept money from the country Somaliland as a whole was trying to distance itself from. President of Somalia Mohamed Abdullahi Mohamed also said he spoke on the phone with President Abdi to discuss the extent of the devastation caused by the fire. The Somali Prime Minister Mohamed Hussein Roble and Somali opposition party leaders also offered their condolences to Somaliland.

=== Canada ===
Members of The Canadian Alliance to Rebuild Hargeisa Market, set up not long after the fire by members of Canada's Somaliland community, meet with Members of parliament in Ottawa to provide $10 million in aid toward rebuilding efforts, and to match funds raised by local community groups across Canada. Canadian based relief organization Relieve Humanity International (RHI) also called on Canadians across the country to provide their support and raise awareness for those affected by the fire.

=== China ===
The Chinese government originally wished to send their diplomat to Somalia Fei Shengchao to Hargeisa to discuss how China could potentially help mitigate the disaster, but further plans potentially saw lawmakers, opposition leaders, and university students attending the envoy as well. The government of Somaliland ultimately called off the diplomatic visit as they suspected that the ultimate motivation was to sabotage the growing Somaliland–Taiwan relations.

=== Taiwan ===
Taiwan donated twice with aid and funding exceeding USD1 million. Taiwan first donated on 27 April, when Taiwan's Ministry of Foreign Affairs donated USD500,000 to help relieve victims of the fire. On 30 April, the Taiwanese government and two Taiwanese NGOs donated another USD550,000 (NT $16.91 million) and containers of humanitarian supplies to those affected by the fire. The monetary and aid package was delivered to Somaliland authorities by an envoy headed by Allen Lou (羅震華).

=== United Kingdom ===
United Kingdom Prime Minister Boris Johnson addressed the fire and voiced his sympathy in a message on Twitter, saying also that the "UK will do what we can to support Somaliland's rebuilding effort". UK Foreign Secretary Liz Truss also offered her condolences on Twitter, also saying that the "UK is working with the authorities and international partners to seek to provide support". The main Somaliland-UK GoFundMe raised more than £10,800. Communities, particularly in Wales, also came together to raise more than £5,500 in donations on GoFundMe. Another event in Sheffield raised money by holding a Iftar dinner with local councillors, MPs, and Somaliland community members on 3 May. Their GoFundMe raised just over £900.

=== United States ===
On the morning of 2 April, United States Ambassador to Somalia Larry Andre spoke with President Abdi on the phone, saying he was "relieved no one was seriously hurt". The United States House Committee on Foreign Affairs also offered their condolences to Somaliland, wishing "those injured [a quick] recover[y]". On 5 April, The Somali community in Minneapolis and 40 organizers came together to raise awareness and launch fundraisers including a GoFundMe for the people affected by the fire, according to organizer Abdirahman Kahin. The GoFundMe raised more than USD16,700.

=== Other nations ===
Kenya, specifically Kenya's main opposition leader Raila Odinga and the Ministry of Foreign Affairs, offered their condolences to Somaliland, with some Somalilander communities in Nairobi organizing a fundraiser towards reconstruction efforts. The European Union was the only other union to offer to aid Somaliland.

Former President of Kosovo Behgjet Pacolli said he was "saddened to see the destruction caused by the fire" and called on the international community to assist in the reconstruction efforts. Ethiopian Prime Minister Abiy Ahmed responded to the fire by saying said he was "shocked and saddened" by the fire that had caused "incalculable losses". Ethiopia sent later in the day on 2 April a delegation including the Minister of Finance Ahmed Shide to the Somaliland presidential palace. United Nations, Djibouti, Qatar, and even Somali registered terrorist organization Al-Shabaab offered their condolences.

== See also ==
- 2022 in Somaliland
- Waheen Market
