= Sheikh Ibrahim Sheikh Yusuf Sheikh Madar =

Somali religious and political leader

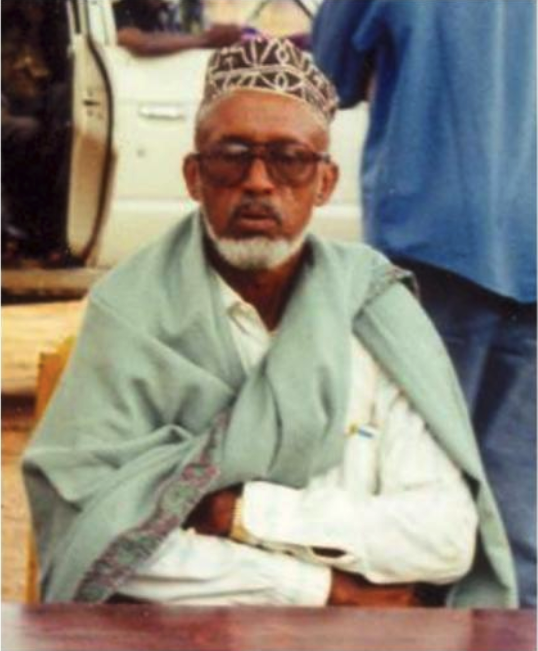

1st Speaker of the Somaliland House of Elders
- In office 1993 – 23 July 2004
- Preceded by: Post established
- Succeeded by: Suleiman Mohamoud Adan

Personal details
- Born: 1925
- Died: 23 July 2004

Sheikh Ibrahim Sheikh Yusuf Sheikh Madar (Somali: Sheekh Ibraahim Sheekh Yuusuf Sheekh Madar; 1925 – 23 July 2004) was a Somali religious and political leader who played a key role in the early political organization of Somaliland.

He was the son of Sheikh Yusuf Sheikh Madar and the grandson of the 19th-century religious leader Sheikh Madar. He belonged to the Sa'ad Musa sub-division of the Habr Awal Isaaq clan. In Somali naming tradition, Sheikh is an honorific title, not a surname; Ibrahim is his given name, Yusuf his father’s name, and Madar his grandfather’s name, showing that all three generations held the title Sheikh.

== Early leadership ==
Amid the turmoil and fighting of late 1988, he was again chosen as chair of the national council of elders (Guurti), which played a mediating role among the communities of northwestern Somalia during the final stages of the civil war.

During the 1992 conflict between the Habar Yoonis and Isa Musa clans, Sheikh Ibrahim Sheikh Yusuf Sheikh Madar chaired a 31-member reconciliation committee formed after talks in Djibouti to end the fighting and stabilize Hargeisa and Berbera. Despite repeated mediation visits by the Guurti under his leadership, the fighting continued through most of 1992, illustrating both the limits and the emerging authority of Somaliland’s elder-based peace process.

== Role in peacebuilding ==
During the 1993 Borama Conference, which laid the foundation for the modern Somaliland government, Madar acted as a convener of the national Guurti (Council of Elders). He led preparatory efforts to organize logistics and representation for the conference and was involved in outreach to neighbouring regions to mobilize participation.

== Establishment of the House of Elders ==
Following the establishment of Somaliland’s bicameral parliament, he became the first Speaker of the House of Elders (Guurti) in 1993, a position he held until his death in 2004.

In February 1994, he chaired a reconciliation meeting between government representatives and the Guurti to address renewed tensions following earlier conflicts. In March 1994, he reportedly considered recalling the full National Guurti of 150 elders for another all-clan conference to consolidate peace efforts.

In the aftermath of the April 2003 presidential election, amid a highly contested result and rising political frictions, the Guurti—led by its President, Ibrahim Yusuf Sheikh Madar—intervened to mediate between the parties and calm the situation.

On 6 October 2003, a memorial ceremony was held in Hargeisa for Annalena Tonelli, who had been killed in Borama the previous day. Sheikh Ibrahim Sheikh Yusuf Sheikh Madar attended the ceremony as Speaker of the House of Elders.

== Illness and death ==
For health reasons, Madar remained in the United Kingdom in his final years, receiving treatment and rehabilitation at a hospital in London. He died on 23 July 2004. His funeral was attended by senior political and religious figures, including the President of Somaliland, party leaders, cabinet ministers, members of parliament, scholars, and thousands of ordinary citizens. After his death, the House of Elders convened an emergency session and decided that its First Deputy Speaker, Sheikh Ahmed Sheikh Nuh, would serve as acting Speaker until a new Speaker was elected.

== Legacy ==
Madar’s leadership of the Guurti is remembered as a formative period for Somaliland’s system of elder-based mediation and consensus politics. Somali-language commentary has described his tenure as a model of balance and restraint that influenced later parliamentary leaders.

A secondary school in Hargeisa bears his name: Sh. Ibrahim Sh. Yousuf Secondary School.

Political offices
Preceded by Post established	Speaker of the House of Elders; 1993–2004	Succeeded by Suleiman Mohamoud Adan
