= Fadumo Saeed Ibrahim =

Somaliland politician, born 1961

- Faadumo Siciid Ibraahim
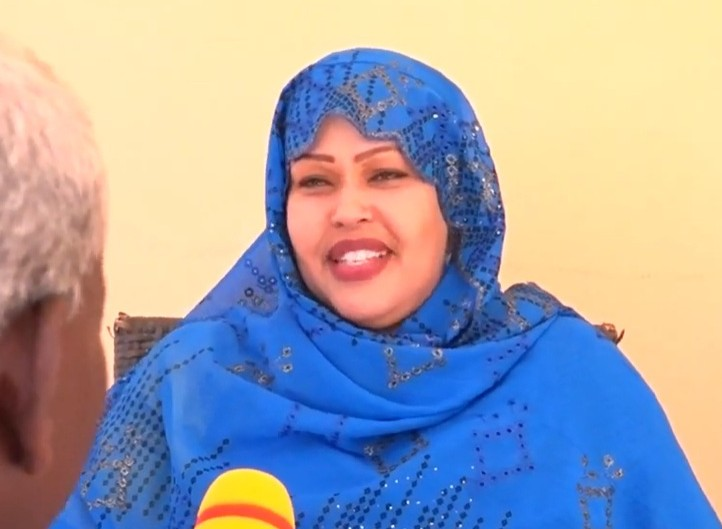

Foreign Affairs Advisor to the House of Elders
- Incumbent
- Assumed office February 2021

Secretary of Foreign Affairs of the Waddani Party
- In office 2018 – October 14, 2019

Secretary of Finance of the UCID Party
- In office By February 2013 – 2014

Personal details
- Born: 1961 (age 64–65) Oodweyne, Somaliland
- Party: UCID (until 2014); Waddani (2014–2019); Independent (2019–present)
- Spouse: Dr. Idris Ibrahim Abdi (m. 1979; died 2012)
- Parent: Cadar Abdillahi Abdi (mother)
- Occupation: Politician, activist

Fadumo Saeed Ibrahim (Somali: Faadumo Siciid Ibraahim), also known as Marwo Fadumo, is a Somaliland politician and activist. She has served in senior leadership and advisory roles across major political parties and institutions in Somaliland. Her career includes serving as the chairperson of the Organization for Development and Humanitarian Affairs (ODHA), the Secretary of Finance for the Justice and Welfare Party (UCID), and the Secretary of Foreign Affairs for the Waddani party. She later served as a senior foreign affairs advisor to the House of Elders (Guurti), becoming the first woman to manage foreign policy for the parliamentary chamber.

== Biography ==
=== Early life and education ===
In 1961, Fadumo was born in the rural area of Oodweyne. Her mother is Cadar Abdillahi Abdi and her father lived in the United Kingdom at the time. Her mother normally lived in Berbera but had traveled to the Oodweyne District for health reasons before Fadumo's birth. Fadumo was the oldest of five children and had two brothers and two sisters. Fadumo spent her first two years in Berbera before temporarily moving to Aden, Yemen.

Around 1963 or 1964, Fadumo moved to the Newport, Wales of the United Kingdom with her parents. Growing up in Wales during the 1960s, Fadumo lived within a very small Somali diaspora. At the time, the local Somali population primarily consisted of merchant seamen, with only a few established families, including her own, residing in the area.

She attended kindergarten and primary school there. She completed her high school education in the late 1970s. Upon completing her high school education, Fadumo was presented with a choice between attending a university preparatory college or continuing her studies for two additional years to obtain a professional teaching qualification. She chose the latter, focusing on gaining practical educational credentials.

In 1979, immediately after completing her educational training in the United Kingdom, Fadumo traveled to Mogadishu, Somalia, where she married Dr. Idris Ibrahim Abdi. Her husband later (2003) served as the Minister of Livestock of Somaliland.

=== Somali civil war ===
During the Somali civil war, it began from late 1980's, Fadumo fled to Cardiff, Wales of the United Kingdom, and supported the Somaliland independence movement from Wales, particularly within the diaspora communities of Cardiff and Newport. She assisted BBC Wales in producing documentary films, including one titled "A Country at War with its People," which highlighted the conflict and facilitated family reunions for refugees.

During her time in the United Kingdom, Fadumo collaborated with the British Home Office. At their request, she established the Wales Refugee Council to support refugees in the region. She also worked with the Race Equality Council during this period.

=== Return to Somaliland ===
Fadumo returned to Somaliland in 1991.

Following her return to Somaliland in 1991, Fadumo engaged in regional development and social advocacy. In 1998, she transitioned into a career with international non-governmental and intergovernmental organizations. She initially worked with the Swiss Group and subsequently joined Save the Children.

Fadumo later joined the United Nations (UN). Throughout her tenure with these international organizations, her work focused on human rights advocacy, institutional capacity building, and community development. Among her notable initiatives, she managed human rights programs and led training programs designed to support and professionalize local women and police forces. She also supervised the establishment of nighttime security and monitoring systems at the Mandera Prison.

In 2005, Fadumo acted as a facilitator for an official fact-finding mission sent by the African Union (AU) to Somaliland. During the mission, she guided the delegation to mass grave sites in Hargeisa, such as Malko-Durduro—reported as one of the sites of the Isaaq genocide, to show them physical evidence of past massacres, which deeply influenced the delegation's subsequent report on Somaliland's unique political situation.

In late 2011, Fadumo served as the chairperson of Organization for Development and Humanitarian Affairs (ODHA). Through her work, she supported the establishment of the Berbera Maritime and Fisheries Academy and a center for homeless children in Hargeisa. She also promoted athletics by organizing running events for young people in Somaliland and taking some of them to Djibouti.

In February 2013, Fadumo worked as the Secretary of Finance for the UCID political party.

In December 2013, Fadumo traveled toward the Gabiley region. During the journey, government police forces stopped her and a UCID party presidential candidate at the Ababla checkpoint and forced them to return. This incident occurred during a period of political tension regarding voter registration and freedom of movement for opposition parties in Somaliland.

=== Waddani party ===
In December 2014, Fadumo officially joined the Waddani opposition political party after resigning from her position as the Secretary of Finance for the UCID political party. Upon her return to Hargeisa from a two-month overseas trip to Turkey and Kuwait, she publicly criticized the government's foreign policy and spoke out against the detention of journalists in Somaliland.

In May 2015, Fadumo attended a political event in London organized by the UK women's wing of the Waddani opposition political party. Following her stay in the United Kingdom, she traveled to North America to participate in events celebrating Somaliland's Independence Day on May 18 with the Somaliland diaspora community.

In May 2017, Fadumo attended a political event in Hargeisa to welcome a group of female supporters from the Sahil region who left the ruling Kulmiye party to join the Waddani opposition political party. During her speech, she emphasized that voters needed to support Waddani to protect the economic future of their children and criticized the government's management of Berbera.

In August 2017, Fadumo was appointed to a newly established political committee within the Waddani opposition political party. Abdirahman Mohamed Abdullahi (Irro), the party chairman and presidential candidate, selected her as a member of the Committee on Policy and Foreign Affairs. This committee was one of nine groups created to organize the party's campaigns for the upcoming national election.

In January 2018, Fadumo reported that the district commissioner of Ibrahim Koodbuur in Hargeisa had threatened her with arrest. She stated that the district administration had improperly handled issues related to her house. The district commissioner publicly denied her allegations.

In August 2018, Fadumo served as the Secretary of Human Rights for the Waddani opposition political party. During a political debate in Hargeisa, she spoke about the challenges of the democratic system in Somaliland. She argued that the current electoral system requires too much money, which forces candidates to either be very wealthy or rely on their clans for financial support.

In October 2019, Fadumo resigned from her position as the Secretary of Foreign Affairs for the Waddani opposition political party and left the party completely. She stated that the party had failed to fulfill its role as an effective opposition and cited internal conflicts with other party officials regarding the selection of the party's general secretary.

=== Special Adviser for the House of Elders ===
Following her resignation from the Waddani party in late 2019, Fadumo maintained an independent political stance.

In February 2021, Fadumo was appointed as the Special Adviser on Foreign Affairs for the House of Elders of Somaliland. Her appointment was approved by the First Deputy Speaker of the House of Elders, Siciid Jama Ali. She is the first woman appointed to manage foreign policy for the house.

She advocated for women's political participation and called for unified networks to support female candidates across party lines ahead of the 2021 elections. She emphasized that women and youth should cooperate as a cohesive unit for the country's development.

In March 2022, Fadumo traveled to Belgium as part of a parliamentary delegation from Somaliland. At the time, she served as the foreign affairs advisor to the Guurti, the upper house of the parliament. The delegation received an invitation from the European Parliament in Brussels to attend meetings with European officials.

In November 2022, Fadumo faced organized harassment and criticism on social media. The attacks began after she made a public speech about national identity. In her speech, she argued that citizens of Somaliland should be called Somalilanders rather than Somalis to highlight the clear distinction between Somaliland and Somalia.
