= Muse Haji Abdi Duale =

Somaliland politician and Speaker of the House of Elders of Somaliland since 12 July 2026

Muse Haji Abdi Duale موسى حاجي عبدي دوعاله

3rd Speaker of the Somaliland House of Elders
- Incumbent
- Assumed office 12 July 2026
- President: Abdirahman Mohamed Abdullahi (Irro)
- Preceded by: Suleiman Mohamoud Adan

Muse Haji Abdi Duale (Somali: Muuse Xaaji Cabdi Ducaale) is a Somaliland politician and traditional elder who has served as Speaker of the House of Elders, the upper house of the Somaliland parliament, since 12 July 2026. He succeeded Suleiman Mohamoud Adan (Saleebaan Gaal), who resigned after nearly 22 years in office. Duale is a cousin of Dahabshiil founder Mohamed Said Duale.

== Election as Chairman ==
On 12 July 2026, long-serving Guurti Chairman Suleiman Mohamoud Adan resigned during an extraordinary session of the House of Elders. Suleiman, then 92, cited advanced age and declining physical strength, telling members that although his mind remained sharp, his “steps had slowed”. Lawmakers accepted his resignation and moved to elect a successor.

Three candidates initially put themselves forward: Duale, Sahal Iidle Dirir, and Sultan Ismail Sultan Abdirahman, who later withdrew. The election was held the same day, with 73 members voting by show of hands in favour of Duale, while eight voted for Sahal Iidle Dirir.

== Tenure ==
Following his election, President Abdirahman Mohamed Abdullahi (“Irro”) received Duale and the outgoing chairman, Suleiman Mohamoud Adan, at the presidential office. President Irro congratulated Duale on earning the confidence of the House and expressed hope that he would strengthen the Guurti's role in safeguarding peace, stability, national unity, and Somaliland's democratic process.

In late July 2026, Duale received the National Peace Committee, led by Chairman Abdilqadir Haji Ismail Jirde, at his office. The meeting was also attended by the first and second deputy chairmen and the secretary-general of the House of Elders. Discussions focused on strengthening the peace process, fostering cooperation between the House of Elders and the Peace Committee, and enhancing public awareness regarding peace and national development. The Peace Committee emphasised the Guurti's role in matters of peace, religion, and culture. Duale has also engaged parliamentary staff and called for renewed commitment to the House's work.

== See also ==
- House of Elders (Somaliland)
- Suleiman Mohamoud Adan
- Politics of Somaliland
