= 1997 Somaliland presidential election =

National election

- 23 February 1997

315 electors 158 votes needed to win
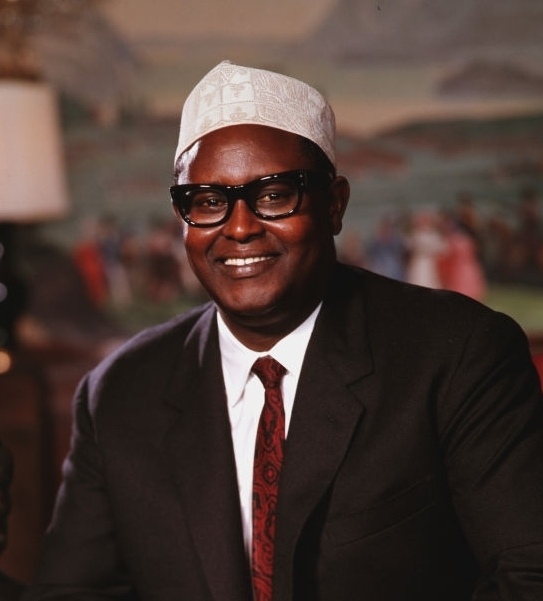

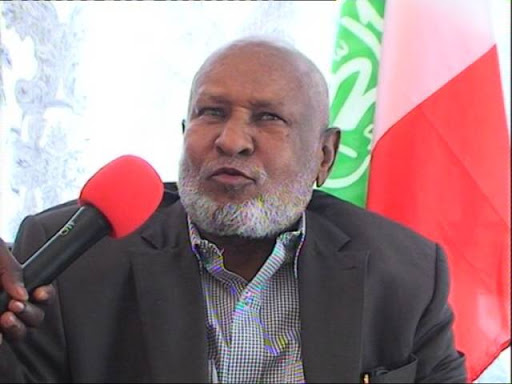
Candidate	Muhammad Haji Ibrahim Egal	Suleiman Mohamoud Adan
Party	Independent	Independent
Electoral vote	223	90
Percentage	70.79%	28.57%
President before election
Muhammad Haji Ibrahim Egal
Independent
Elected President
Muhammad Haji Ibrahim Egal
Independent

Presidential elections were held in Somaliland on 23 February 1997, the third indirect presidential election since the country declared its independence from Somalia in 1991. The elections took place towards the end of the Hargeisa Conference, held between October 1996 and February 1997. The election resulted in incumbent President Muhammad Haji Ibrahim Egal being reelected to a four-year term by an electoral college of elders who made up the national guurti(council of elders). Egal's closest competitor was Minister of Finance Suleiman Mohamoud Adan, who was also formerly in the cabinet of inaugural President Abdirahman Ahmed Ali Tuur.

== Background ==
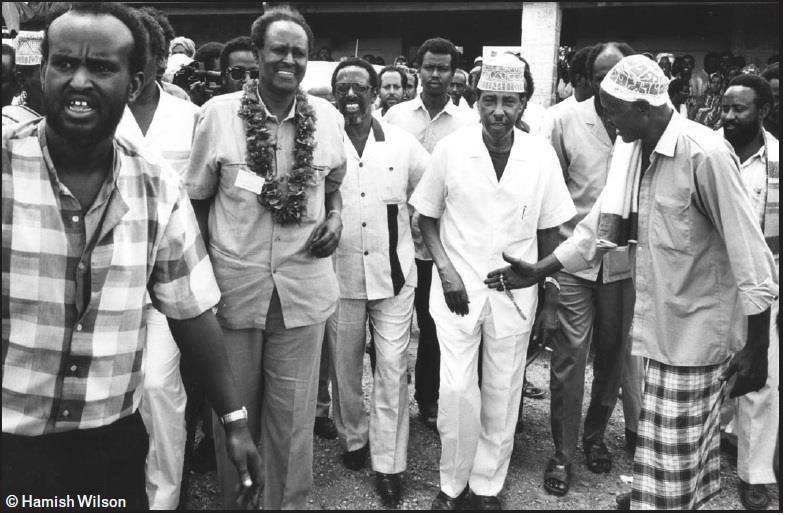
After the 1993 election, the outgoing president, Abdirahman Ahmed Ali Tuur, leaves the hall alongside newly elected president, Muhammad Haji Ibrahim Egal. Tuur is being congratulated by an elder man on his decision to accept the outcome of the election and stand down peacefully after several days intense debate and negotiation.

Shortly after declaring its independence from Somalia in mid-1991, SNM Chairman Abdirahman Ahmed Ali Tuur was elected Somaliland's first provisional president by clan elders. He held the position until 16 May 1993, when clan elders elected Mohamed Haji Ibrahim Egal to serve a two-year term as president of the country's first post-war civilian government. In May 1995, Egal's term was extended for another 18 months. New elections were held on 23 February 1997.

== Results ==
Candidate	Party	Votes	%
Muhammad Haji Ibrahim Egal	Independent	223	70.79
Suleiman Mohamoud Adan	Independent	90	28.57
Mohamed Hashi	Independent	2	0.63
Total		315	100.00
Source: African Elections

== Aftermath ==
President Egal remained in office until his death in May 2002. He was succeeded in office by his vice president, Dahir Riyale Kahin, who would go on to win the first direct presidential elections in 2003.
