= Sayid Hussein Feisal Ali Warabe =

Finnish-Somali man who joined ISIS and was killed

- Born: 1991
- Died: December 2017 (aged 25–26)
- Other name: Abu Shuayb as-Somali
- Citizenship: Finland
- Children: 2
- Father: Faysal Ali Warabe

Sayid Hussein Feisal Ali Warabe (1991 – December 2017) was a Finnish Muslim of Somali descent who left Finland for Syria to join then the Islamic State of Iraq and the Levant. He was reported to have been killed in December 2017.

== Life and death ==
Sayid had Finnish citizenship and lived in Espoo. He left Finland in early 2013 to become a jihadi fighter. First he traveled to Somaliland, then tried to go to Yemen, but he was stopped because his passport was near its expiration date. His father bought him a plane ticket back to Finland and warned the Finnish authorities not to renew his son's passport, but they did anyway. Three months later, Sayid left for Syria via Turkey, taking his Finnish wife with him.

Sayid joined ISIL, and he and his wife's two children were born in Syria. He appeared in an ISIL propaganda video in August 2014, urging Finnish Muslims to join, using the nom de guerre Abu Shuayb as-Somali. His cousin, the son of his maternal uncle, also left Leppävaara for Syria. His cousin, who also appeared in an ISIL propaganda video, was killed in June 2014.

In an interview with YLE in 2014, Sayid's father, Somaliland politician Faysal Ali Warabe, said his son's decision to become a jihadist had shocked and disappointed him and that he blamed himself for having been an absent father during his son's early years. He urged Muslim parents to monitor what their children were doing at the mosque and online.

In January 2018, Warabe reported that his daughter-in-law had contacted him over WhatsApp told him Sayid had been killed in an airstrike on December 29, 2017. He said his son had been trying to leave Syria and return to Finland with his wife and children at the time he was killed, having realized it was a “mistake” to join ISIL.

== See also ==
- Ifthekar Jaman, one of the first British men to travel to Syria and fight for ISIL
- Zafirr Golamaully, an ISIL blogger from Mauritius
- University of Medical Sciences and Technology terrorist cell, a group of British-Sudanese students and recent graduates who joined ISIL
- Ugbad and Rahma Sadiq, two Somali-Norwegian sisters who joined ISIL
