= Waheen Market =

Major Market in Somaliland

- سوق واهيَن (Arabic); Suuqa Waaheen (Somali)
- Location within Somaliland
- 9.5631725°N 44.0699626°E
- Type: Bazaar, Marketplace
- Location: Hargeisa, Somaliland

Site notes
- Architectural styles: Islamic architecture, Ottoman architecture

Waheen Market (Arabic: سوق واهين, Somali: Suuqa Waaheen), also sometimes referred to as Waheem, Waaheen, or Waaheem Market, is a major market in Hargeisa in the self-proclaimed nation of Somaliland.

== Overview ==
Waheen Market has been referred to as the lifeblood, and "economic centre of Hargeisa" by the city's mayor Abdikarim Ahmed Mooge. The market is also the largest in Somaliland, and was one of the largest in the Horn of Africa, being an important trading hub with financial links to other parts of the world including the Middle East, China, Asia, and Europe. Waheen Market primarily served Somalilanders, Somalis, Ethiopians, and Kenyans though. The market is also made up of a fair share of migrant workers from Somalia, Kenya, and other parts of East Africa, with the majority of the workers in the market being women.

Before the fire in April 2022, the market consisted of an estimated 2,000 market stalls and was the workplace of over 12,000 Somalilanders. Fresh fruit and meat stands, grocery stores, tea shops, restaurants, tailor shops, beauty service stores, and tech support stores were among the stalls you could find in the market, some being multistory.

== History ==
Not much is known about when Waheen Market was founded or who founded it, but Ottoman architecture and buildings dating back to the 19th century are prevalent.

=== April 2022 Fire ===
On the evening of 1 April 2022, a massive fire broke out in the market, destroying an estimated 2,000 to 5,000 stalls and affecting some 17,000 traders directly. The fire reduced a good part of the market to rubble, destroying an estimated 99,000 m² (about 24 acres) of land. with damage estimates up to around USD $2 billion.

== See also ==
- 2022 in Somaliland
- Somali Civil War (2009–present)
