= Mohamoud Haibe District =

IBRAHIM KODBUR District Degmada IBRAHIM KODBUR
- District
- Country SOMALILAND: Somaliland
- City: Hargeisa
- Time zone: UTC+3 (EAT)

Ibrahim Kodbur District (Somali: Degmada Ibrahim Kodbur) is a district in Hargeisa, Somaliland. It is biggest district in hargeisa or also the eight administrative districts of Hargeisa City.
