= Mercy-USA =

Humanitarian-aid organization

Mercy-USA for Aid and Development, is a humanitarian-aid organization with main offices in Plymouth, Michigan. It is registered under 501(c)(3) as a non-profit charity organization. According to its website, Mercy-USA is "dedicated to alleviating human suffering and supporting individuals and their communities in their efforts to become more self-sufficient". Incorporated in the State of Michigan in 1988, Mercy-USA's projects focus on improving health, nutrition and access to safe water, as well as promoting economic and educational growth around the world. Mercy-USA has developed projects in many countries including Kenya, Albania, Lebanon, Syria and Somalia.

== Activities ==
Albania
Mercy-USA has been involved training orphans in English and computer skills. It also established a "Read to Succeed" program for school-age children and teenagers.

Bosnia and Herzegovina
In addition to providing vocational and career training for orphans, at-risk teenagers, and young adults, Mercy-USA established the Agriculture Education Center to aid farmers and local communities with sustainable farming methods in Bosnia and Herzegovina.

The Gaza Strip
Mercy-USA provides daily meals for young adults as well as vocational training in Gaza.

India
Mercy-USA provides seasonal food aid to India.

Indonesia
In Indonesia, Mercy-USA has been active in providing aid to farmers and local communities by introducing sustainable farming methods. In addition, it assists farmers in forming cooperatives. As in Albania, it also offers English and computer skill training for orphans.

Kenya
Mercy-USA provides nutritional support and health services for mothers and children in Kenya. In addition, it created a water and sanitation/hygiene program at 24 elementary and pre-schools to prevent infectious diseases. This work was in partnership with the United States Agency for International Development (USAID/OFDA).

Lebanon
Mercy-USA has been very active in the Syrian Refugee crisis offering Syrian refugee assistance in Wadi Khalid, Lebanon, providing mobile health clinic serves for refugees four times a week, and providing vaccines, pre- and post-natal checks and regular medical exams. In addition it offers bread distribution and baby diapers to recent Palestinian refugees from Syria in Beddawi Refugee Camp. It further offers vocational training courses and Palestinian refugee assistance in Beddawi and Nahr-Al-Bared Palestinian Refugee Camps.

Somalia
To date, Mercy-USA has provided over 300 new or rehabilitated wells for access to clean drinking water throughout Somalia as well as nutritional support and health services for mothers and children. Since 1994, it has been providing tuberculosis treatment and prevention, and has opened six centers. The centers also provide HIV/AIDS and STI testing, treatment and counseling.

Syria
Mercy-USA provides monthly food baskets and infant formula for 1,000 vulnerable families in Aleppo, Syria. It established a Mother and Child Health Clinic providing prenatal, postnatal and birthing services in addition to pediatric healthcare for newborns, infants and children. Winter seasonal aid, including winter clothing for children and women, plus winter-weight blankets for over 1,000 households, is provided each winter. Seasonal hygiene aid is offered to beneficiary families.

== Transparency ==
Mercy-USA states that less than 5% of its funds go toward fundraising and management. For 2014, nearly 97% of its total expenses were spent on programs and services, as reflected in a four-star rating by Charity Navigator. This was the sixth year it had received the four star rating. In 2014, 51% of its resources were dedicated to food, shelter and orphan assistance. Forty-three percent of donations were allocated to health, 4% to education and 2% to economic vitalization.

== Leadership ==
- President and chief executive officer: Mr. Umar al-Qadi
- Chief financial officer: Mr. Anas Alhaidar
