= Faysal Ali Warabe =

Somali politician

- Faysal Cali Waraabe فيصل علي ورابي
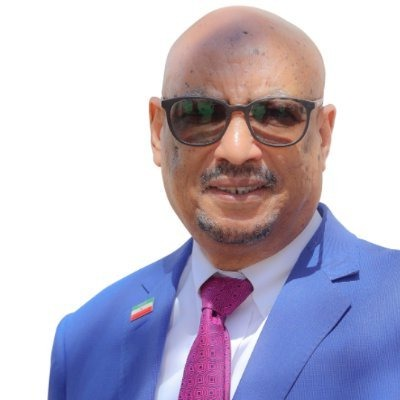
- Warabe in 2023

Leader of the Justice and Welfare Party
- In office 2001–2024
- Preceded by: Position established
- Succeeded by: Party dissolved

Personal details
- Born: Faisal Ali Farah; 12 January 1948 (age 78) Hargeisa, British Somaliland (now Somaliland)
- Party: Justice and Welfare Party (2001–2024)
- Education: Somali National University; University of Helsinki

Faysal Ali Warabe (/fɑːˈiːsəl ˈɑːli wəˈrɑːbi/ fah-EE-səl AH-lee wə-RAH-bee; Somali: Faysal Cali Waraabe, Arabic: فيصل علي ورابي; born 1948), also spelled Faisal Ali Warabe, is a Somaliland engineer and politician. He previously served as Director of Planning and Building as well as Regional Director of Somalia's Ministry of Public Works. Additionally, Warabe is the founder and chairman of the Justice and Welfare Party (UCID).

== Life and education ==
Warabe was born in 1948 in Hargeisa, British Somaliland. He hails from the Eidagale clan of the Isaaq clan family. Faysal Ali completed his Primary, Intermediate and Secondary education in Somaliland. For his post-secondary education, Waraabe studied at Somali National University where he learned courses in teacher training, Warabe studied in the Soviet Union. He earned an M.Sc. in Engineering in 1973 from an institution in Leningrad. Between 1997 and 2001, Warabe also matriculated at the University of Helsinki's Faculty of Social Sciences, where he attended courses in the Social Policy Department. He later moved to Espoo.

Warabe is married. He speaks several languages, including Somali, Arabic, English, Russian and Finnish. Warabe received Finnish citizenship in 1999.

=== Son's death ===
Warabe's son Sayid Hussein Feisal Ali Warabe had Finnish citizenship. He left Finland in early 2013 to become a jihadi fighter but was stopped and returned to Finland when he tried to go to Yemen. His father warned the Finnish authorities not to renew his son's passport, but they did anyway. Three months later, Warabe's son left for Syria via Turkey, taking his Finnish wife with him.

In an interview with YLE in 2014, Warabe said his son's decision to become a jihadist had shocked and disappointed him and that he blamed himself for having been an absent father during his son's early years. He urged Muslim parents to monitor what their children were doing at the mosque and online.

In January 2018, Warabe reported his son had been killed in an airstrike the previous month, at the age of 24.

== Career ==
An engineer by profession, Warabe began his career as the president of AYAAN, a local Somali construction company. He later worked as a chief engineer in Mogadishu.

Warabe subsequently served with the Somalia central government as the director of planning and building in the Ministry of Public Works. He was later appointed the Ministry's regional director.

In 2001, Warabe founded the Justice and Welfare Party (UCID) in Somaliland. Serving as the political association's chairman, UCID came in third place in the 2003 regional elections, receiving 16% of votes.

== Work ==
Main offices

- Regional Director, Ministry of Public Works, Somalia
- Director of Planning & Building, Ministry of Public Works
- Chief Engineer, Mogadishu, Somalia
- President of AYAAN construction company

Other positions held

- Chairman of Somaliland Society in Europe (2001)
- Chairman of Somali Social Democrats Party (2001)
- Chairman of Somaliland Association in Finland (1998–2001)
- Chairman of Somali Social Democrats Party (1997)

Other activities

- Spokesman for Somaliland Peace Committee, 1995
