= Mohamed Aw-Ali Abdi =

Somaliland politician

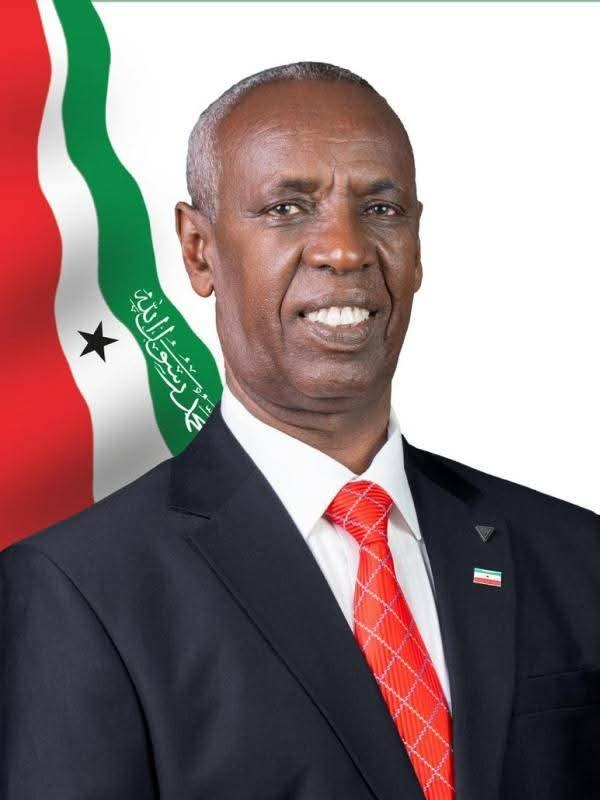
- Official vice presidential portrait

6th Vice President of Somaliland
- Incumbent
- Assumed office 13 December 2024
- President: Abdirahman Mohamed Abdullahi
- Preceded by: Abdirahman Saylici

Personal details
- Party: Waddani
- Occupation: Politician

Mohamed Aw-Ali Abdi (Note: Also spelt Mohamed Ali Aw Abdi) (Somali: Maxamed Cali Aw Cabdi) is a Somaliland politician who is the Vice President of Somaliland. A member of the political party Waddani, he contested the 2024 presidential election with presidential nominee Abdirahman Mohamed Abdullahi and won in a political upset.

Mohamed ran for vice president as the running mate of presidential challenger Abdirahman Mohamed Abdullahi in the 2017 election. In November 2016, he led a large delegation of Waddani politicians to Borama for a campaign event. Later that same month, he held a campaign event in Birmingham, United Kingdom. In April 2017, he also led a Waddani delegation to Switzerland to meet the Somalilander diaspora and Waddani supporters there. Ultimately, incumbent president Muse Bihi Abdi won re-election.

In March 2021, ahead of the scheduled presidential election in 2022, Mohamed and Abdirahman were elected near-unanimously to be the Waddani vice-presidential and presidential nominee, respectively. The general election was later delayed until 2024. In June 2022, Mohamed visited the house of Hersi Ali Haji Hassan with other national-level Waddani politicians after Hersi's house was targeted by an allegedly pro-government vehicular attack. Delivering remarks at the scene, Hersi alleged that the incumbent government had orchestrated a separate, failed vehicular attack against other national-level Waddani politicians, including Mohamed. A month before the November 2024 election, Mohamed promised that a new presidential administration would build an airport at Borama and a highway between Borama and Baki District. Mohamed and Abdirahman won in a political upset.

The new administration was sworn in on 13 December 2024.
