= Suleiman Mohamoud Adan =

Somali politician

Suleiman Mohamoud Adan سليمان محمود آدم
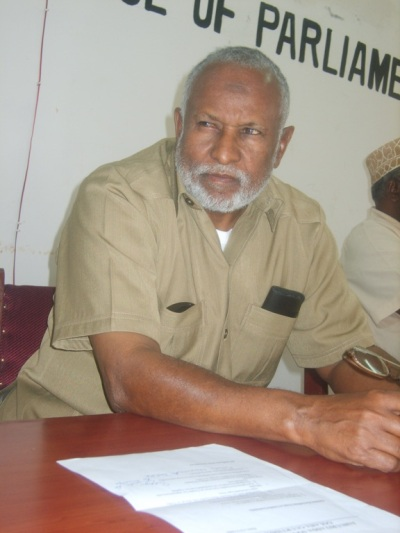

2nd Speaker of the Somaliland House of Elders
- In office 28 August 2004 – 12 July 2026
- President: Dahir Riyale Kahin; Ahmed Mohamed Mohamoud; Muse Bihi Abdi; Abdirahman Mohamed Abdullahi
- Preceded by: Sheikh Ibrahim Sheikh Yusuf Sheikh Madar
- Succeeded by: Muse Haji Abdi Duale

7th Minister of Finance
- In office 1996–1997
- President: Mohamed Haji Ibrahim Egal
- Preceded by: Awil Haji Omar
- Succeeded by: Yusuf Ainab Muse

1st Minister of Interior
- In office 1991–1993
- President: Abdirahman Ahmed Ali Tuur
- Preceded by: Office established
- Succeeded by: Muse Bihi Abdi

Personal details
- Born: 1937 (age 88–89)

Suleiman Mohamoud Adan (Somali: Saleebaan Maxamuud Aadan, Arabic: سليمان محمود آدم), also known as Saleebaan Gaal, is a Somaliland politician and the speaker of Somaliland House of Elders since 28 August 2004.

== Biography ==
Suleiman Mohamoud Adan Yusuf was born in 1937. He belongs to the Solomadow subclan of the Habr Je'lo Isaaq.

Suleiman worked as a teacher and principal in various schools throughout Somalia, eventually rising to become the director of the Somali Curriculum Development Office. In 1980 he was appointed Deputy Minister of Education, and in 1987 he was appointed the Deputy Minister of Fisheries. He later defected to the Somali National Movement in 1989.

In 1991 he was appointed Minister of Interior in Somaliland's first government under President Abdirahman Ahmed Ali Tuur. Under President Muhammad Haji Ibrahim Egal's administration, he also served as Minister of Education and later as the Minister of Finance.

In 1997, he contested Somaliland’s 1997 presidential election against incumbent President Mohamed Haji Ibrahim Egal and Mohamed Hashi, though Egal retained the presidency. He also contested the 2002 Somaliland municipal elections as chairman of the ASAD political association before later joining the then ruling UDUB party after ASAD's dissolution.

In 2004 he was elected Speaker of the House of Elders, a legislative body comprising 82 members with six-year terms.

On 12 July 2026, after 22 years in office, Suleiman resigned during an extraordinary session of the House of Elders. Suleiman, then 92, cited advanced age and declining physical strength, telling members that although his mind remained sharp, his “steps had slowed”. Lawmakers accepted his resignation and moved to elect a successor. He was succeeded by Muse Haji Abdi Duale, who was elected with 73 votes.

== See also ==
- House of Elders (Somaliland)
- Ministry of Finance (Somaliland)
- Parliament of Somaliland
- Politics of Somaliland

Political offices
Preceded by Awil Haji Omar	Minister of Finance; 1996–1997	Succeeded by Yusuf Ainab Muse
Preceded by Sheikh Ibrahim Sheikh Yusuf Sheikh Madar	Speaker of the House of Elders; 2004–present	Incumbent
