= House of Elders (Somaliland) =

Upper house of the Parliament of Somaliland

House of Elders Golaha Guurtida مجلس الشيوخ

Type
- Type: Upper house

History
- Founded: 1993

Leadership
- Speaker: Muse Haji Abdi Duale since July 12, 2026

Structure
- Seats: 82 members
- Political groups: Non-partisan (82)
- Length of term: 6 years

Meeting place
- Hargeisa

Website
- www.govsomaliland.org/hoe

Footnotes
- House of Elders on Facebook

The House of Elders (Somali: Golaha Guurtida, Arabic: مجلس الشيوخ, romanized: majlis ash-Shuyūkh), also known as the Guurti, is the upper house of the Parliament of Somaliland. It has 82 members, representing traditional leaders. The House of Elders is mandated with considering bills proposed by the lower house of the parliament, the Somaliland House of Representatives.

Somaliland National Charter of 1993 established bicameral legislature. It was at a national gathering of clan elders at the 1993 conference in Boorama that delegates assigned the Guurti the role of peacemaker and upper house of the legislature. The term of office for the House of Elders is six years, but it has never been re-elected since it was founded in 1993.

In contrast, members of the Somaliland's House of Representatives, Somaliland's Lower house, are elected through democratic elections.

According to the Somaliland Constitution, the House of Elders has the power to reject a resolution of the House of Representatives, but the will of the House of Representatives prevails if the resolution is re-passed by a 2/3 majority of the House of Representatives.

Somaliland's political form is not yet stable, and although the term of office for the House of Representatives is constitutionally set at five years, actual elections for members have only been held twice until 2023, in 2005 and 2021, due to various circumstances. The House of Elders plays an important role in extending the term of the House of Representatives. The term of office of the President is also set at five years, but the term has always been extended in the past, and the House of Elders plays an important role in this as well.

== Structure ==
Guurti seat allocation by clan/region in 2022
1. Habr Je'lo: 14 (17.1%)
2. Garhajis: 11 (13.4%)
3. Dhulbahante: 11 (13.4%)
4. Gadabursi: 10 (12.2%)
5. Habr Awal: 9 (11.0%)
6. Warsangeli: 7 (8.54%)
7. Arap: 6 (7.32%)
8. Issa: 4 (4.88%)
9. Ayub: 3 (3.66%)
10. Tol Je’lo: 2 (2.44%)
11. Aba Yunis 1 (1.22%)
12. Gahayle: 1 (1.22%)
13. Madigaan: 1 (1.22%)
14. Gabooye: 1 (1.22%)
15. Akisho: 1 (1.22%)

Guurti seat allocation by clan/region
#	Color	Clan/Region	Region	Seats
1		Habr Je'lo	Sahil, Togdheer, Sool, Sanag	14
2		Garhajis	Marodi Jeh, Sahil, Togdheer, Sanaag, Sool	11
3		Dhulbahante	Togdheer, Sool, Sanaag	11
4		Gadabursi	Awdal	10
5		Habr Awal	Awdal, Marodi Jeh, Sahil, Togdheer	9
6		Warsangeli	Sanaag	7
7		Arap	Marodi Jeh, Togdheer	6
8		Issa	Awdal	4
9		Ayuub	Marodi Jeh	3
10		Tolje'lo	Marodi Jeh, Togdheer	2
11		Aba Yunis	Togdheer, Sool	1
12		Gahayle	Sanaag	1
13		Madigaan	Marodi Jeh	1
14		Gaboye	Awdal, Marodi Jeh, Sahil, Togdheer, Sool, Sanag	1
15		Akisho	Marodi Jeh	1
---		Wadarta Guud (Total)		82

The constitution of the Republic of Somaliland ARTICLE 60

NUMBER OF MEMBERS OF THE HOUSE OF ELDERS

1. The number of members of the House of Elders shall be 82 (eighty-two), who shall elect from among themselves a Speaker, two Deputy Speakers, and such committees as the House may require. The House shall have a Permanent Committee consisting of 25 (twenty-five) members. 2. In each term, the House shall be supplemented by a number of honorary members, as follows: (A) Five members appointed by the President on the basis of their special contributions to the Nation; their membership shall last for the same duration as the term of office of the House. (B) Any person who has previously served as Speaker of the House of Elders or Speaker of the House of Representatives. (C) Any person who has previously served as President or Vice-President of the Republic of Somaliland. (D) Honorary members shall have no voting rights in the House and shall not be eligible to serve on the Permanent Committee.

== History ==
=== Background ===
The Guurti, the predecessor of the Somaliland Council of Elders, existed long before the founding of Somaliland. However, it was not institutionalized, nor was it a permanent organization, as the elders of the clans concerned gathered whenever a matter arose.

In 1991, the Somali National Movement (SNM), which was mainly led by the Isaaq clans in northwestern Somalia, declared the establishment of the Republic of Somaliland. However, the military factions were unable to unite the country under their rule, and in 1993, the SNM asked the elders of the clans to mediate between the factions.

=== Great Congress of National Reconciliation ===
In 1993, at the "Great Congress of National Reconciliation" in Borama, Guurti was institutionalized as a House of Elders, with 82 members elected from various parts of Somaliland. The House of Elders then nominated Muhammad Haji Ibrahim Egal as the new Somaliland President.

The 1997 interim constitution set the term of the House of Elders at six years. The Constitution of Somaliland, which took effect in 2001, also clearly states about the House of Elders.

In 2003, the House of Elders' term expired, but the term was changed by presidential decree to "one year after the term of the House of Representatives." The term of the House of Representatives also expired in May 2003, but the House of Elders decided to extend the term of the House of Representatives by two years.

=== Replaced by 2nd Speaker ===
In July 2004, Sheikh Ibrahim Sheikh Yusuf Sheikh Madar, Chairman of the House of Elders, died in London, where he was visiting for medical treatment. Suleiman Mohamoud Adan was elected his successor.

=== 2005 Somaliland parliamentary election ===
Since the Somaliland parliamentary election were held in 2005, the term of the House of Elders was set for 2006. However, in May 2006, the Somaliland House of Elders itself decided to extend the term of the House of Elders by four years.

=== 2010 Somaliland presidential election ===
The presidential term of office as stipulated in the Somaliland Constitution was five years, but in April 2008, the House of Elders of Somaliland approved the president's request to extend the presidential term by one year. Subsequently, the National Electoral Commission requested another one-year extension, citing remaining technical issues, and the House of Elders of Somaliland approved this request as well. The presidential election was eventually held in June 2010, two years later, and Ahmed Mohamed Silanyo was elected.

=== 2017 Somaliland presidential election ===
In September 2010, the House of Elders extended its own term of office by three years and eight months, and also extended the term of the House of Representatives by two years and eight months.

In April 2013, the House of Elders decided to extend the term of the House of Representatives, which expires in May, through 2015. This will extend the term of the House of Elders through 2016.

On May 16, 2015, the House of Elders announced that it would extend its own term until June 2018. They further announced a two-year extension of President Dahir Riyale Kahin's term, which also expires in 2015. The National Electoral Commission had announced a one-year extension of the presidential election a few days earlier for technical reasons, the decision that was overlaid. Eventually, presidential elections were held in November 2017 and Muse Bihi Abdi was elected.

=== 2021 Somaliland parliamentary election ===
In November 2017, the House of Elders announced that the House of Representatives parliamentary elections would be postponed until 2019.

The House of Elders further announced in January 2019 that elections would be postponed. At this time, it was once decided that the elections for the House of Representatives would be held in January 2022 and the House of Elders in January 2023 In response, the United Nations Support Mission in Somalia (UNSOM) expressed concern.

In July 2020, the three main Somaliland parties reached an agreement on the method of elections, and in October, the House of Elders of Somaliland signed an agreement to hold parliamentary and local elections on this basis.

Somaliland Electoral Commission started voter registration in November 2020 as scheduled. In January 2021, the Somaliland Electoral Commission submitted to the President a proposal to hold simultaneous parliamentary and local elections on May 31, which the President approved. In February 2021, the House of Elders unanimously agreed.

=== 2024 Somaliland presidential election ===
In October 2022, the House of Elders extended the President's term of office by two years, which was scheduled to expire on November 13, 2022. The House of Elders itself extended its own term by five years. However, some legislators opposed this decision. This decision was criticized by the British and U.S. governments.

In January 2023, the House of Elders discussed the situation in Las Anod.

In May 2023, 13 members of the House of Elders were absent from the assembly and ordered to attend.

=== Replaced by 3rd Speaker ===
In July 2026, Suleiman Mohamoud Adan resigned due to his age 92 and poor health. Three candidates ran for the position of chairperson, but in accordance with the House of Elders' tradition of avoiding a vote, two withdrew their candidacies, and Muse Haji Abdi Duale was confirmed by an overwhelming majority.

== Speakers ==
- Sheikh Yusuf Ali Sheikh Madar, 1993 - July 2004, died in office
- Suleiman Mohamoud Adan, August 2004 – July 2026
- Muse Haji Abdi Duale, July 2026 – Present

== See also ==
- History of Somaliland
- Legislative branch
- List of national legislatures
- Fadumo Saeed Ibrahim - a senior foreign affairs advisor to the House of Elders from 2021.
