= Arap =

Somali clan

Arap

Regions with significant populations
- Somaliland, Ethiopia, Djibouti, Kenya

Languages
- Somali

Religion
- Sunni Islam

Related ethnic groups
- Eidagale, Habr Awal, Habar Yoonis, Habr Je'lo and other Isaaq groups

Arap (Somali: Arab) is a major northern Somali clan of the wider Isaaq clan family. The Arap predominantly live on the middle and southwest side of Hargeisa. They also inhabit the Baligubadle district, with its capital Baligubadle being are an exclusively Arap territory. They also predominantly live in the Haud. The territory of the clan extends to Ethiopia, in the area of Faafan, Gursum and Dhagahle. The Abdalle Arab, a sub-clan of the Arap clan is based in the Togdheer, Sahil. The Celi Arab, a sub-clan of the Arap clan is based in Hargeisa. Another sub clan, the Muuse Celi inhabit the Bakool region in the South West State of Somalia, specifically the districts of Rabdhure and Elbarde.

== History ==
=== Lineage ===
Sheikh Ishaaq ibn Ahmed is a legendary mythical figure who purportedly arrived in the Horn of Africa to spread Islam around the 12th to 13th century. Hence, Sheikh Ishaaq married two local women in Somaliland that left him eight sons, one of them being Muhammad (Arap). The purported descendants of those eight sons constitute the Isaaq clan-family.

The Arap clan have historically been an important part of the Isaaq clan-family and belong to the wider Habr Magaadle confederation. They are closely associated with the Garhajis clan, with whom they are considered “twin clans” in genealogical traditions.

Traditionally, the Arap inhabited territories south and west of Hargeisa, including what is today the Baligubadle District. Oral traditions also describe their involvement in the caravan trade linking the interior of Somaliland to the coastal ports of Zeila and Berbera.

During the sixteenth century, the Arap, alongside other Habr Magaadle lineages such as the Habr Awal and Habr Je'lo, contributed fighters to the Adal Sultanate’s military campaigns against the Ethiopian Empire and were the first ones to join the call for Ahmed Gurey’s jihad, as recorded in the Arabic chronicle Futuh al-Habasha.

In the modern era, the Arap played a key role in the formation and operations of the Somali National Movement (SNM) during the 1980s. The Baligubadle area became the SNM’s headquarters, and several prominent leaders of the movement came from the Arap clan, most notably Sultan Mohamed Sultan Farah and Hassan Isse Jama.

Following Somaliland’s declaration of independence in 1991, Sultan Mohamed Sultan Farah became widely respected for spearheading the clan-based demobilisation process. His son, Sultan Umar Sultan Mohamed, succeeded him in 2003 and remained in leadership until his death in 2021.

== Role in the SNM ==
Baligubadle, which straddles the border between Ethiopia and Somaliland, was the headquarters of the Somali National Movement (SNM) during the Somaliland War of Independence from the regime of general Siad Barre.

The Araps were heavily involved in the SNM and led the first military offensive of the SNM near Baligubadle where a small force attacked a fuel tanker supplying the Somali Revolutionary Socialist Party regime's base in the town. This operation was organised by local commanders without prior planning utilizing a local force of clansmen based at the organisation's Lanqeyrta base in Hawd.

Hassan Isse Jama was also one of original founders of the SNM in London. He was also the first vice president of Somaliland and served as the deputy chairman of the SNM. Furthermore in 1983, Sultan Mohamed Sultan Farah of the Arap clan was the first sultan to leave Somalia to Ethiopia and openly cooperate with the SNM.

=== Familial ties ===
Historically, the Arap took part in the conquest of Abyssinia, and were part of the Adal Sultanate and are mentioned in the book Futuh Al-Habash (Conquest of Abyssinia) as the Habar Magaadle, along with the Ayub, Habar Yoonis, Habar Awal and Eidagalle clans. The Habar Magaadle are known for producing a historical figure known as Ahmad Gurey bin Husain who was the right-hand man of Ahmad ibn Ibrahim al-Ghazi his clan arap. The Arap were the first clan agreed to lead the process of demobilization. This put pressure on other clans to follow suit, and, in early 1994, a well-staged ceremony was held in the Hargeysa football stadium to hand over weapons, playing an instrumental role in the Somaliland peace process.

== Notable Arap people ==
- Hassan Isse Jama - One of the founding fathers of the SNM in London. Former Deputy chair of SNM, First vice president of Somaliland.
- Nimcaan Yusuf Osman - Chief of the General Staff of the Somaliland Armed Forces since January 23, 2025.
- Dayib Gurey - was a senior SNM senior commander who led the invasion.
- Edna Adan Ismail - The first Somali woman to study in Britain, first qualified nurse-midwife, and former foreign minister of Somaliland.
- Khalil Abdillahi Ahmed - is a Somali politician currently served as the Minister of Endowment and Religious Affairs of Somaliland
- Farah Nur - Legendary Somali poet from late 1800s- early 1900s
- Sultan Omar Sultan Mohamed Sultan Farah - Former sultan of the Arap clan
- Sultan Mohamed Sultan Farah - Former Sultan of the Arap clan and commander of the SNM's 10th division
- Abdilahi Husein Iman Darawal - Somaliland politician and former SNM commander.
- Abdullahi Abdi Omar "Jawaan" - Somaliland politician and introducer of the National emblem of Somaliland
- Abdillahi Fadal Iman - former Chief of Somaliland Police Force
- Ahmed Osman (Also known as "Ina Geele-Arap") - Business tycoon in Djibouti and Somaliland and founder of Somaliland Beverage Industries (SBI)
- Siad Sadiq, mentioned in the Geoffrey Archer's 1916 important members of Darawiish haroun list
- Xirsi bile, mentioned in the Geoffrey Archer's 1916 important members of Darawiish haroun list
- Cali geele darwiish, mentioned in the Geoffrey Archer's 1916 important members of Darawiish haroun list
- Ahmed Abdi Godane - was emir of Alshabaab
- Essa Kayd is a Somaliland politician who currently serves as Minister of Foreign Affairs (Somaliland)
- Sada Mire is a Swedish-Somali archaeologist, art historian

== See also ==
- Somali people
  - Somali clans
