= Somaliland Declaration of Independence =

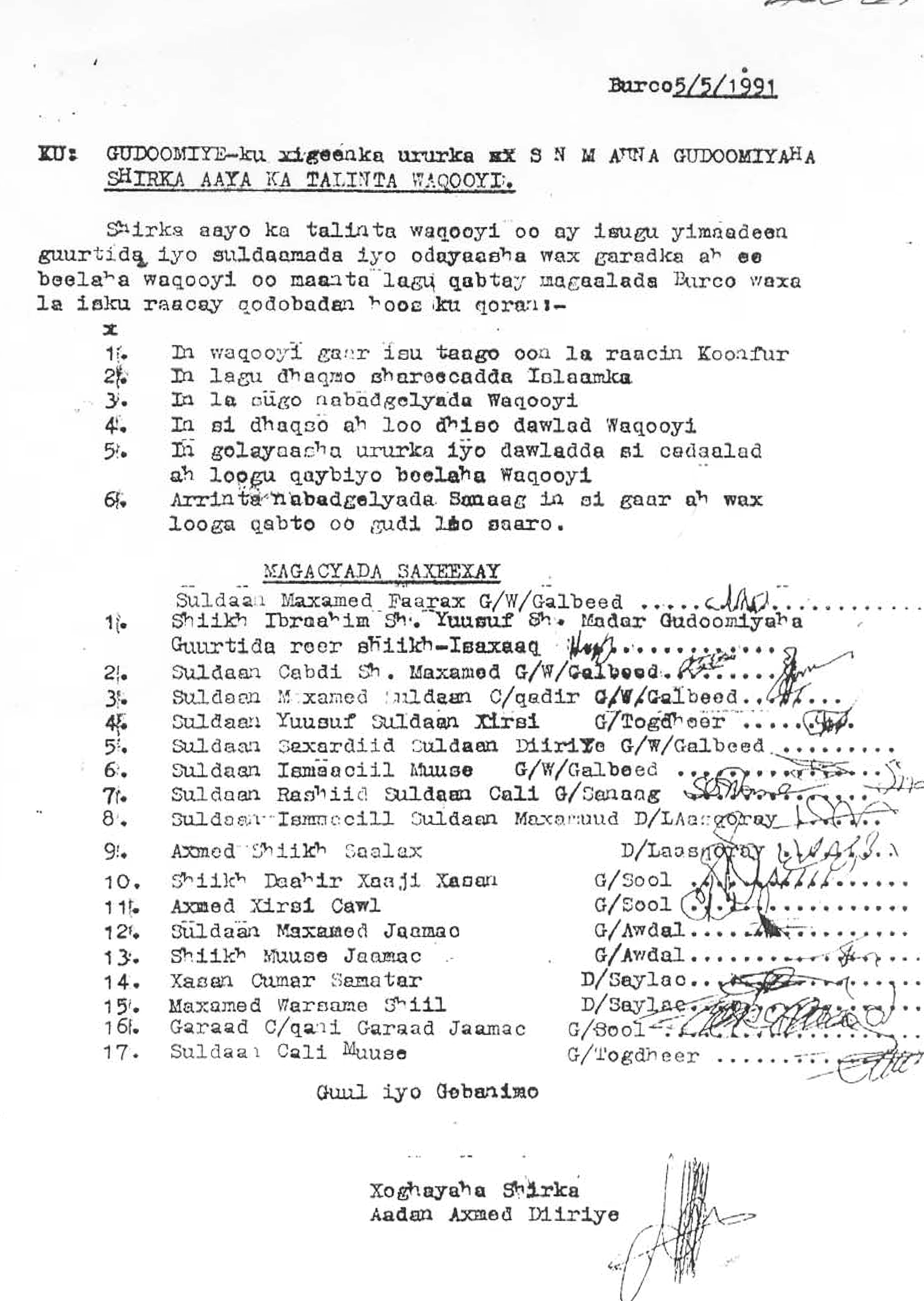
- Agreements between Somaliland sultans from the Isaaq, Dhulbahante, Issa, Gadabursi, Warsangali clans and the Somali National Movement
- Created: 5 May 1991
- Ratified: 18 May 1991
- Location: Burao
- Author: Adan Ahmed Diiriye
- Signatories: 17 Somali sultans from Sool, Sanaag, Awdal, Woqooyi Galbeed and Togdheer signed the Declaration of Independence of Somaliland
- Purpose: Declare the independence of the Republic of Somaliland; End Somaliland War of Independence

The Somaliland Declaration of Independence was made on 18 May 1991 by Somali sultans from the Isaaq, Dhulbahante, Issa, Gadabursi, Warsangali clans, as well as the Somali National Movement.

== Background ==
=== Independence from the United Kingdom ===
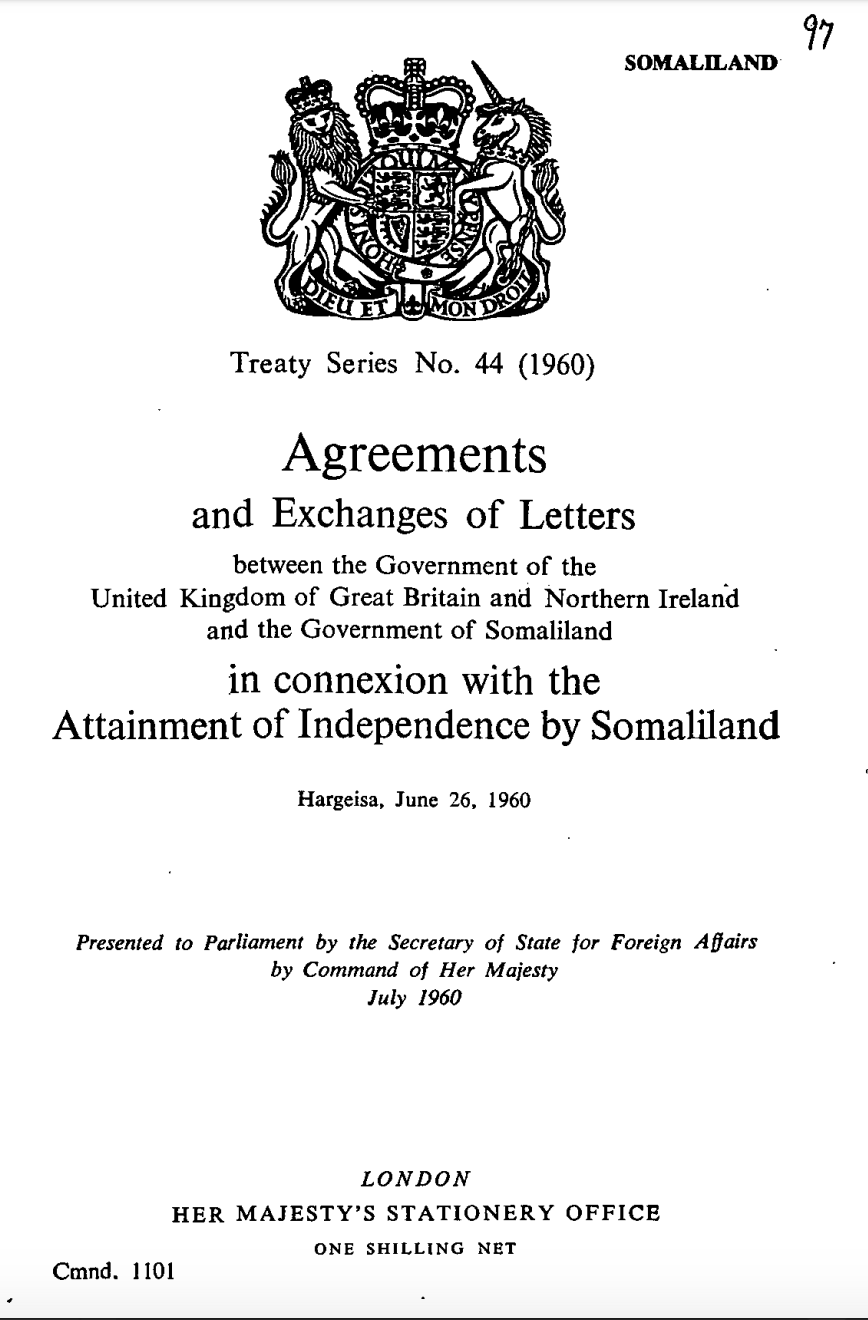
Agreements and Exchanges of Letters between the Government of the United Kingdom of Great Britain and Northern Ireland and the Government of Somaliland in connexion with the Attainment of Independence by Somaliland

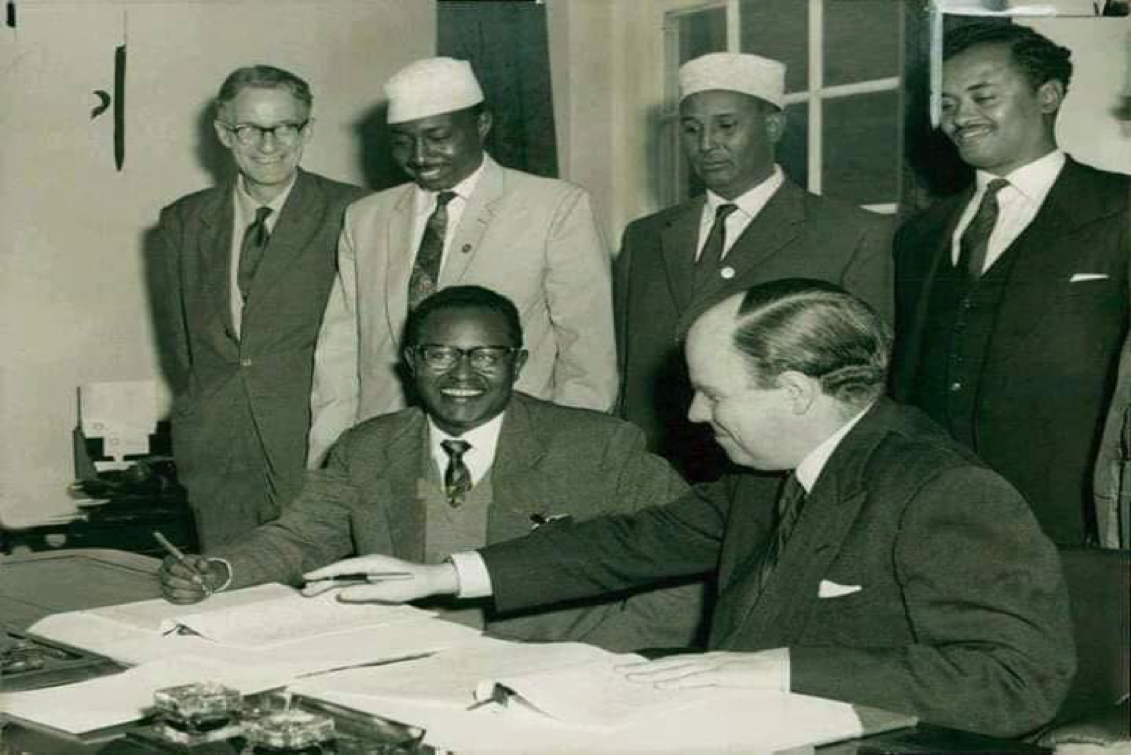
The Somaliland Protectorate Constitutional Conference, London, May 1960 in which it was decide that 26 June be the day of Independence, and so signed on 12 May 1960. Somaliland Delegation: Mohamed Haji Ibrahim Egal, Ahmed Haji Dualeh, Ali Garad Jama & Haji Ibrahim Nur. From the Colonial Office: Ian Macleod, Douglas Hall, 14th Baronet, H. C. F. Wilks (Secretary)

On 26 June 1960, the former British Somaliland protectorate briefly obtained independence as the State of Somaliland, with the Trust Territory of Somaliland following suit five days later. The following day, on 27 June 1960, the newly convened Somaliland Legislative Assembly approved a bill that would formally allow for the union of the State of Somaliland with the Trust Territory of Somaliland on 1 July 1960.

Muhammad Haji Ibrahim Egal, who had previously served as an unofficial member of the former British Somaliland protectorate's Executive Council and the Leader of Government Business in the Legislative Council, became the Prime Minister of the State of Somaliland during its planned transition to union with the Trust Territory of Somaliland under Italian Administration, the former Italian Somaliland.

During its brief existence, the State of Somaliland received international recognition from 35 countries, including China, Egypt, Ethiopia, France, Ghana, Israel, Libya, the Soviet Union, the United Kingdom, and the United States, which sent a congratulatory message:

June 26, 1960
Their Excellencies,
Council of Ministers of Somaliland, Hargeisa.

Your Excellencies: I extend my best wishes and congratulations on the achievement of your independence. This is a noteworthy milestone in your history, and it is with pleasure that I send my warmest regards on this happy occasion.

Christian A. Herter, Secretary of State, United States of America

The United Kingdom signed several bilateral agreements with Somaliland in Hargeisa on 26 June 1960, as well as sending a letter from Queen Elizabeth:

"I, my Government and my people in the United Kingdom, wish you well on this day of independence. The connection between our people goes back some 130 years and British administration of the Protectorate for 60 years. I look forward to a continuing and enduring friendship between our two countries."

There were also fears of clashes with populations in Ethiopia.

On 1 July 1960, five days after the former British Somaliland protectorate obtained independence as the State of Somaliland, the territory united as scheduled with the Trust Territory of Somaliland to form the Somali Republic (Somalia).

A government was formed by Abdullahi Issa, with Haji Bashir Ismail Yusuf as President of the Somali National Assembly, Aden Abdullah Osman Daar as President and Abdirashid Ali Shermarke as Prime Minister, later to become President (from 1967 to 1969). On 20 July 1961, and through a popular referendum, the Somali people ratified a new constitution, which was first drafted in 1960. The constitution was widely regarded as unfair in the former Somaliland because it was seen as centralizing too much power. Over 60% of the northern voters were against it in the referendum. Regardless, it was signed into law as the majority of the rest of Somalia voted in favor. Widespread dissatisfaction spread among the north's population, and British-trained officers attempted a revolt to end the union in December 1961. Many in the north at the time could understand the officers dissatisfaction with the referendum but the majority of northerners still did not want separate as Somali nationalism was very high, many just feared being sidelined by Mogadishu, nether the less the officers uprising failed. North Somalia (Somaliland) unfortunately became more and more marginalized by the Majority South government during the next decades especially as the dictator Siad Barre became more tribalistic after the Ogaden War . .

=== Somaliland peace process ===
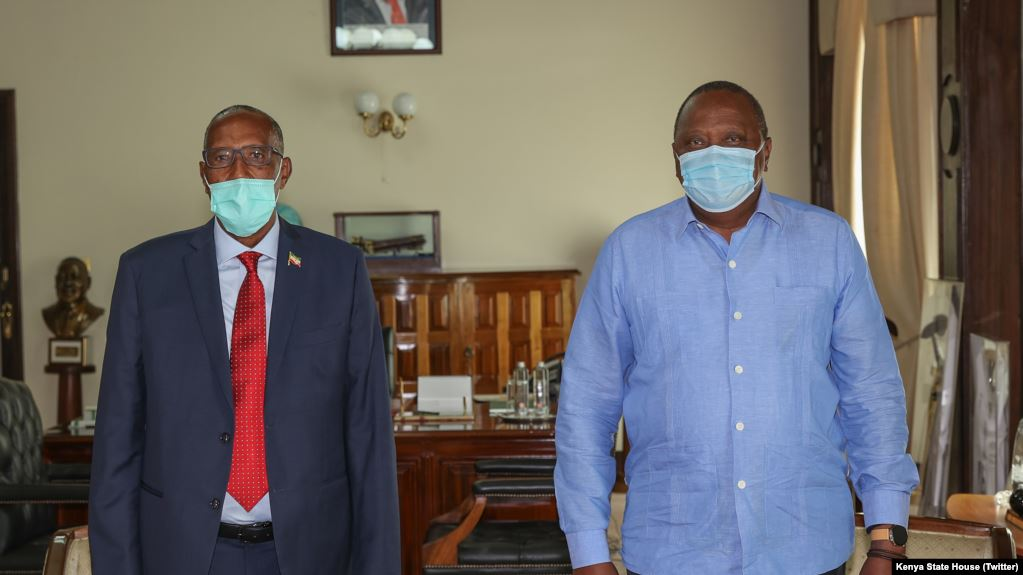
Musa Bihi, President of Republic of Somaliland, in a meeting with Kenyan political representatives.

After the SNM was able to exert control over Somaliland, the organisation quickly opted for a cessation of hostilities and reconciliation with non-Isaaq communities. A peace conference occurred in Berbera between 15 and 21 February 1991 restore trust and confidence between Somaliland communities whereby the SNM leadership had talks with representatives from the Issa, Gadabursi, Dhulbahante and Warsangeli clans. This was especially the case since non-Isaaq communities were said to have been largely associated with Siad Barre's regime and fought on opposing side of the Isaaq.

This conference laid the foundation for the "Grand Conference of the Somaliland Clans" which occurred in Burao between 27 April and 18 May 1991 which aimed to bring peace to Somaliland. After extensive consultations amongst clan representatives and the SNM leadership, it was agreed that Northern Somalia (formerly State of Somaliland) would revoke its voluntary union with the rest of Somali Republic to form the "Republic of Somaliland". Although there were hopes amongst of Somaliland communities for succession as early as 1961, the SNM did not have a clear policy on this matter from the onset. However, any nationalistic objectives amongst SNM members and supporters was abruptly altered in light of the genocide experienced under the Barre regime. As a result, strengthening the case for succession and reclamation of independence to the territory of State of Somaliland. Garaad Cabdiqani Garaad Jama who led the Dhulbahante delegation was first to table the case for succession.

== Signing of the declaration ==
The signing of the Somaliland Declaration of Independence occurred on 5 May resolution of the Burao grand conference. At the second national meeting on 18 May, the SNM Central Committee, with the support of a meeting of elders representing the major clans in Somaliland, declared the restoration of the Republic of Somaliland in the country short-lived independent Government of Somaliland and formed a government for the sovereign country.

=== Contents of Declaration ===
1. In Woqooyi gaar isu taago oon la raacin Koonfur (The North should stand up and not follow the South)
2. In lagu dhaqmo shareecada Islaamka (Practice Islamic law)
3. In la sugo nabadgelyada Woqooyi (Secure the security of the North)
4. In si dhakhso ah loo dhiso dawlad Woqooyi (Quickly establish the Northern government)
5. In golayaasha ururka iyo dawladda si caddaalad ah loogu qaybiyo beelaha Woqooyi (That the councils of the organization and the government be fairly distributed among the northern communities)
6. Arrinta nabadgelyada Sanaag in si gaar ah wax looga qabto oo gudi loo Saaro (The security issue in Sanaag should be dealt with separately and a committee should be established)

=== List of signatories ===
Seventeen Somali Sultans from Sool, Sanaag, Awdal, Woqooyi Galbeed and Togdheer signed the Declaration of Independence of Somaliland.

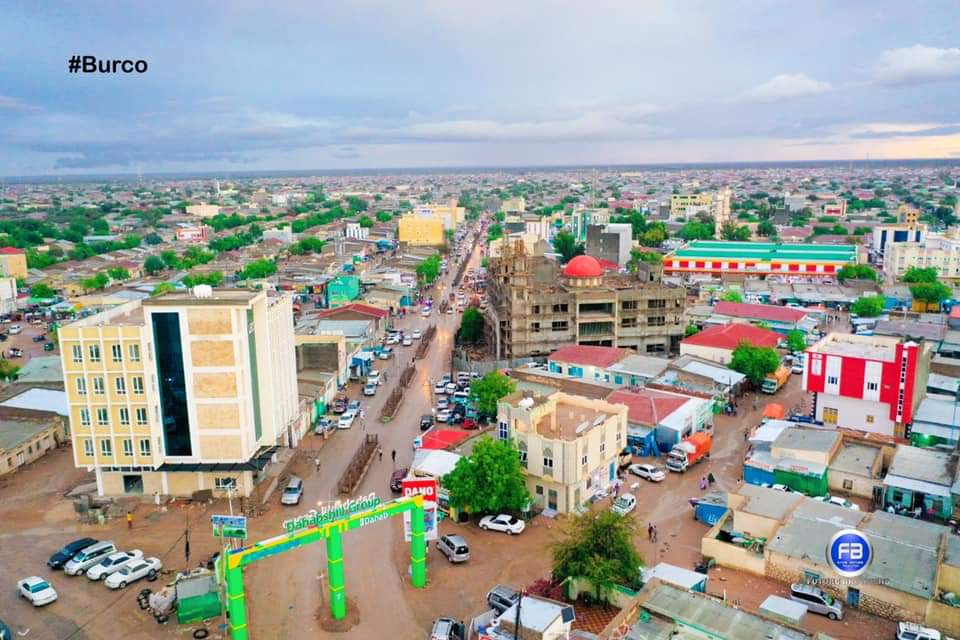
The city in Somaliland where the Somaliland Declaration of Independence was made.

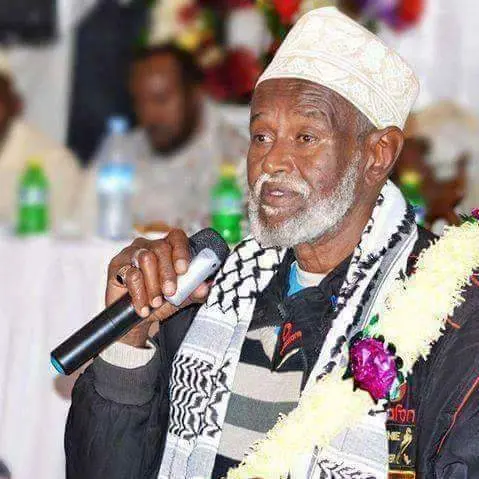
The 8th Grand Sultan of the Isaaq Sultanate, Sultan Mahamed Sultan Abdiqadir, was one of the signatories of the Somaliland Declaration of Independence.

Order of Signatures	Name	Somali Name	Area
Top	Sultan Mohamed Sultan Farah	Suldaan Maxamed Faarax	Woqooyi Galbeed
1	Sheikh Ibrahim Sheikh Yusuf Sheikh Madar	Shiikh Ibraahim Sh. Yuusuf Sh. Madar Gudoomiyaha Guurtida reer shiikh-Isaxaaq	-
2	Sultan Abdi Sh. Ahamed	Suldaan Cabdi Sh. Maxamed	Woqooyi Galbeed
3	Mahamed Abdiqadir	Suldaan Maxamed Suldaan C/qadir	Woqooyi Galbeed
4	Sultan Yusuf Sultan Hirshi	Suldaan Yuusuf Suldaan Xirshi	Woqooyi Galbeed
5	Sultan Sahardid Sultan Diriye	Suldaan Saxardiid Suldaan Diiriye	Woqooyi Galbeed
6	Sultan Ismail Muse	Suldaan Ismaaciil Muuse	Woqooyi Galbeed
7	Sultan Rashid Sultan Ali	Suldaan Rashiid Suldaan Cali	Sanaag
8	Sultan Ismail Sultan Maxamud	Suldaan Ismaaciil Suldaan Maxamuud	Las Khorey(Sanaag)
9	Ahmed Shikh Salah	Axmed Shiikh Saalax	Las Khorey(Sanaag)
10	Shikh Dahir Haji Hassan	Shiikh Daahir Xaaji Xasan	Sool
11	Ahmed Hirsi Awl	Axmed Xirsi Cawl	Sool
12	Sultan Mahamed Jama	Suldaan Maxamed Jaamac	Awdal
13	Shikh Muse Jama	Shiikh Muuse Jaamac	Awdal
14	Hassan Omar Samatar	Xasan Cumar Samater	Zeila(Awdal)
15	Mahamed Warsame Shil	Maxamed Warsaame Shiil	Zeila(Awdal)
16	Garad Abdiqani Garad Jama	Garaad C/qani Garaad Jaamac	Sool
17	Sultan Ali Muse	Suldan Cali Muuse	Togdheer

== Declaration and subsequent negotiations ==
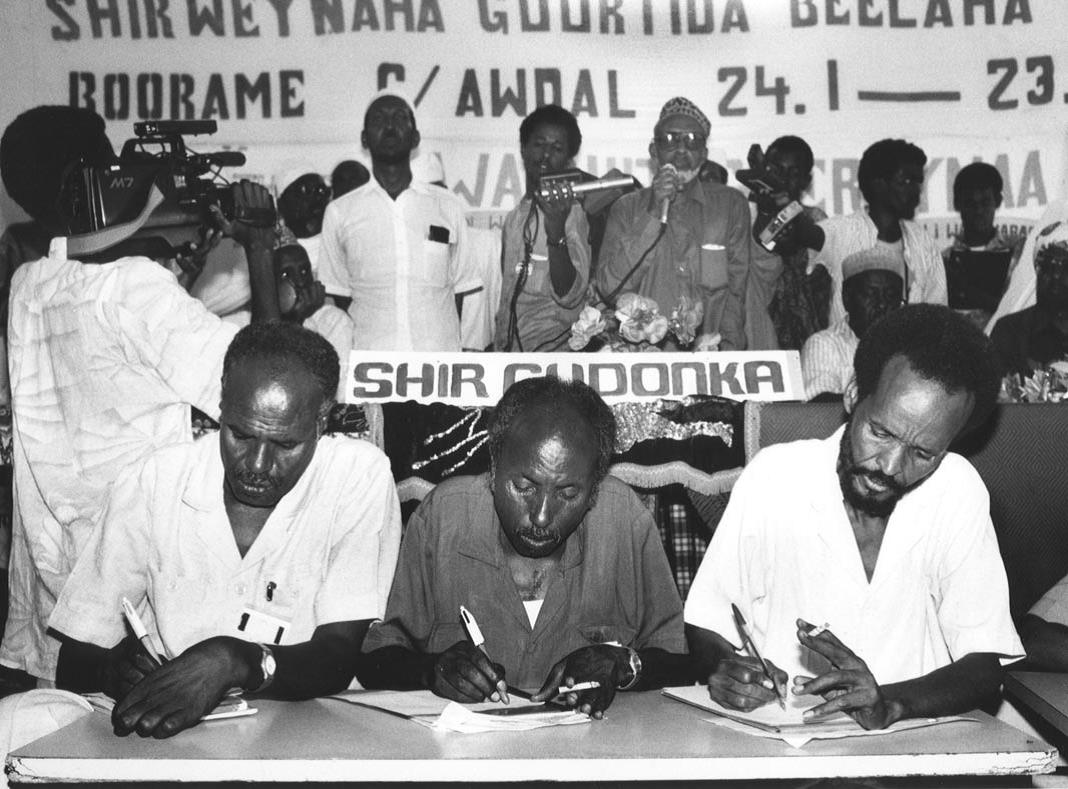
The chairman of the Guurti announces the election results. Mohamed Ibrahim Egal is elected president by a substantial majority and Abdirahman Aw Ali Farrah is declared vice-president.

In May 1991, the SNM announced restoration of the independence of "Somaliland" and the formation of an interim administration whereby Abdirahman Ahmed Ali Tuur was elected to govern for a period of two years. Many former SNM members were key in the formation of the government and constitution. The official proclamation of independence from the Government of Somalia is dated to the week ending 8 June 1991.

In May 1993 the Borama Conference took place to elect a new president and Vice President. The conference was attended by 150 elders from the Isaaq (88), Gadabursi (21), Dhulbahante (21), Warsengali (11) and Issa (9) communities and was endorsed by the SNM. As a result, the conference granted the government of Somaliland local legitimacy beyond the realms of the Isaaq dominated SNM, especially since the town of Borama was predominantly inhabited by the Gadabursi.

At this conference, the delegates agreed to establish an executive president and a bicameral legislature whereby Somaliland's second president Muhammad Haji Egal was elected. Egal would be re-elected for a second term in 1997.

== Somaliland constitutional referendum ==
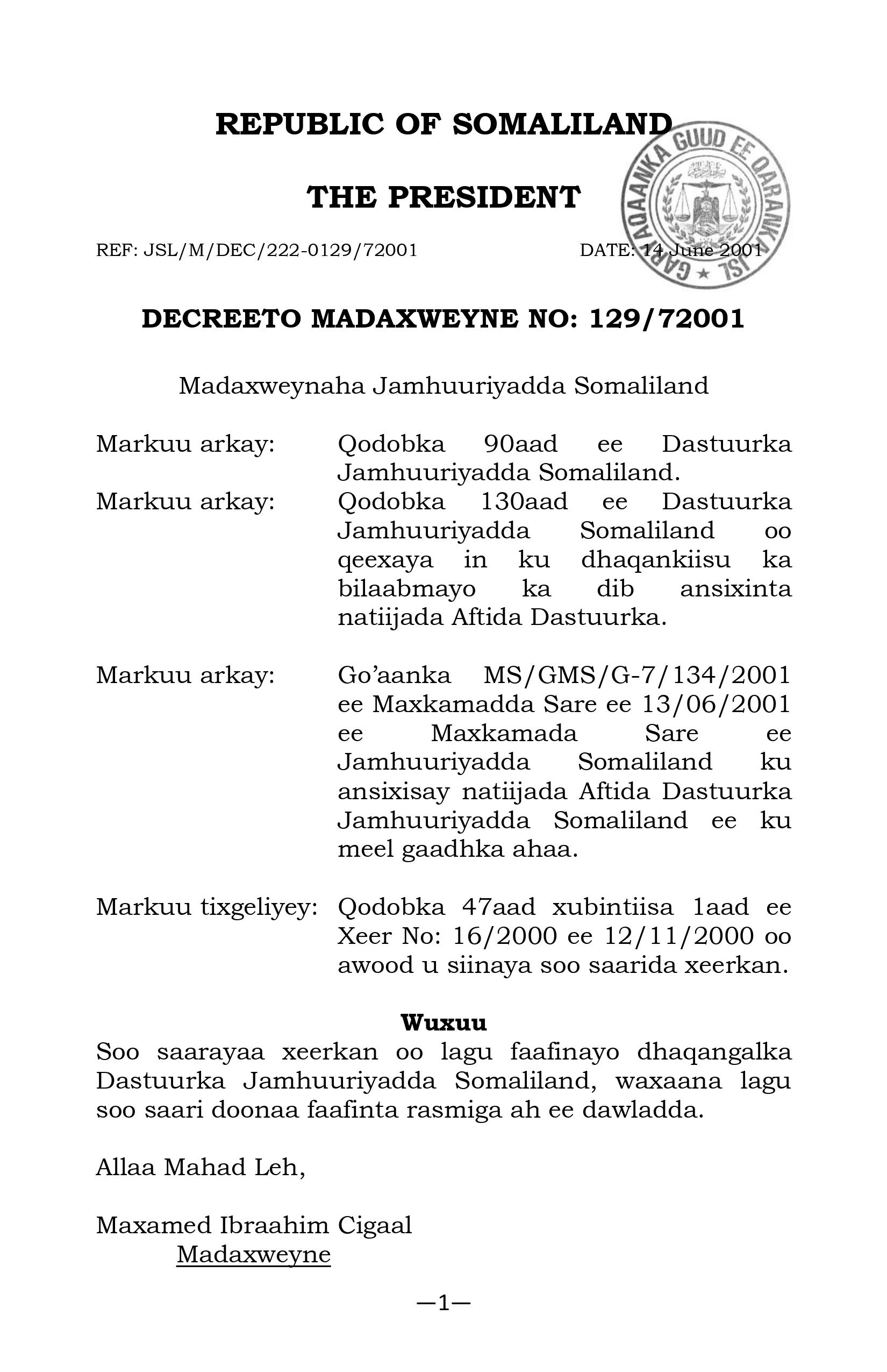
Presidential decree ratifying the Somaliland constitution by Muhammad Haji Ibrahim Egal

On 31 May 2001, a referendum was held on a draft constitution that affirmed the independence of Somaliland from Somalia. But the referendum was opposed by the Somali government and did not lead to any international recognition.

== Borders ==
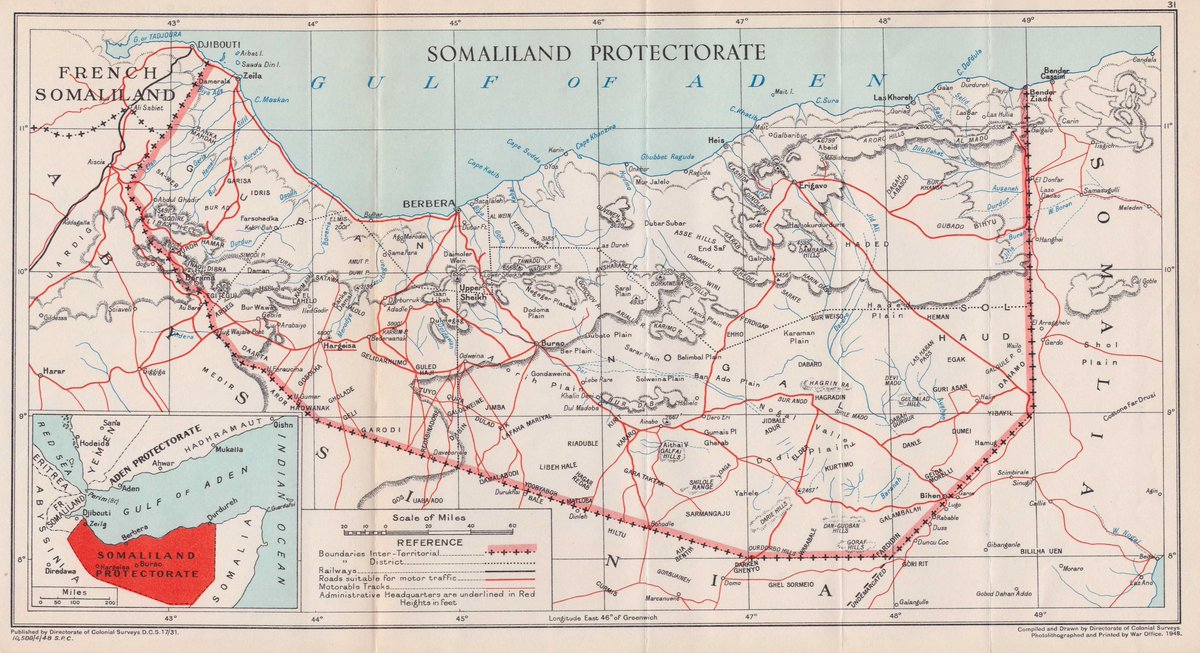
British Somaliland Borders.

The boundaries declared by Somaliland in the Declaration are the British Somaliland borders established by the United Kingdom in 1884. Although a regional administration in Somalia claims the eastern borders of Somaliland in Sool and Sanaag, Somaliland controls 80% of Sool and Sanaag.

== First Somaliland Council of Ministers (1991) ==
National emblem of Somaliland

The first government of Somaliland was headed by Abdirahman Ahmed Ali Tuur as President of Somaliland and Hassan Isse Jama as Vice-President of Somaliland. The first Council of Ministries endorsed by the SNM Central Committee were as follows:

1. Ministry of Internal Affairs and Municipalities: Saleebaan Mohamed Aadan
2. Ministry of Foreign Affairs: Sheekh Yusuf Sh. Ali Sh. Madar
3. Ministry of Finance: Ismail Mohamoud Hurry
4. Ministry of Reconstruction & Rehabilitation: Hasan Adan Wadadid
5. Ministry of Defence: Mohamed Kaahin Ahmed
6. Mystery of Commerce & Industries: Daahir Mohamed Yusuf
7. Ministry of Religion & Justice: Ahmed Ismail Abdi
8. Ministry of Health & Labour: Abiib Diiriye Nuur
9. Ministry of Education, Youth & Sports: Abdirahman Aw Farah
10. Ministry of Fisheries & Coasts: Omer Eisa Awale
11. Ministry of Planning & Development: Jama Rabile Good
12. Ministry of Minerals & Water: Mohamed Ali Aateeye
13. Ministry of Housing & Public Works: Mahdi Abdi Amarre
14. Minstery of Information Tourists: Osman Aadan Dool
15. Ministry of Livestock: Yasin Ahmed Haji Nur
16. Ministry of Telecommunications & Transport (Somaliland): Mohamoud Abdi Ali Bayr
17. Ministry of Agriculture & Environment: Sa’ed Mohamed Nur
18. Ministry of Presidency: Yusuf Mohamed Ali
19. Minstery of Internal Affairs: Ahmed Jambir Suldan
20. Vice Minstery of Defence: Dahir Sheekh Abdillahi
21. Vice Minstery of Finance: Aadan Jama Sahar
22. Vice Minstery of Justice: Sheekh Mohamed Jama Aadan

== See also ==
- Somali Civil War
- List of international declarations
