= Sheikh Belissa Oromo Front =

Sheikh Belissa Front Conflict
- Part of the 1988 Hargeisa-Burao offensive of the Somaliland War of Independence and SNM Oromo conflict
Date	1988–1991
Location	Northern Somalia (Now Somaliland)
Result	SNM victory
Territorial changes	Liquidation of the Oromo Militias

Belligerents
Somali National Movement	Oromos of Sheikh Belissa; Somalia; Oromo Islamic Liberation Front

Commanders and leaders
Ahmed Mohamed Mohamoud; Mohamed Ali; Hassan Yonis Habane	Sheikh Belissa (POW); Sheikh Jaraa

Casualties and losses
- several thousand Oromo civilians killed 20,000 Oromo settlers expelled

The Sheikh Belissa Front was an Oromo insurgent group established by the Somali government in 1985 during the Somaliland War of Independence. Led by Sheikh Ibrahim Belissa, a former member of the Somali Abo Liberation Front, the group was formed primarily from Oromo refugees and Settlers residing in northern Somalia, In what is now Somaliland. Backed by state armaments and international aid allocation from Mogadishu, the group was intended to counter the Isaaq rebels of the Somali National Movement in the northern Somalia and infiltrate Ethiopia northern Hararghe province.

== Background ==
A large number of Oromo refugees fled to northern Somalia between 1980-1984 because of the Ethiopian government's villagization campaign against the Oromo. Under the Siad Barre government of Somalia, a number of the refugees were settled in secluded refugee camps such as Bihin and Bioley to create a physical presence within areas where the SNM operated. In 1985, the government provided military equipment to a section of the refugees under the leadership of Sheikh Ibrahim Belissa, who had been in exile in Hargeisa. from 1986-1988, The Oromo movement did not take part in any campaigns against the SNM.

== Campaign ==
Following the decisive Eritrean Rebel victory at the Battle of Afabet In March 1988, Ethiopian and Somali presidents Mengistu Haile Mariam and Siad Barre met in Djibouti in April of the same year and signed a new agreement to stop supporting rebels in each others territories, and required Ethiopia to expel the SNM forces in their territory. As a result of this agreement, the SNM lost their sanctuary in Ethiopia and on 27 may went on the offensive in northern cities like Burao and Hargeisa. By June 1, The SNM overran both cities and most of Northern Somalia. In response, the government undertook a counter-offensive, in which Sheikh Belissa's group was mobilized along with the regular Somali Army forces (including the 12th Division) and Ogadeni camp militias to fight against the SNM. This was the first major offensive of the Sheikh Belissa Front. Sheikh Belissa's attacks witnessed an extraordinarily high level of indiscriminate violence against the civilian Isaaq population, including routine summary executions, looting and rape as well as some large-scale massacres, prompting a large scale SNM operation to swiftly destroy the Oromo militia. The SNM was involved in several major attacks on unarmed Oromo refugees, as well as conflicts with several other Oromo armed groups such as the Oromo Liberation Front. The Sheikh Belissa Front maintained institutional linkages with Sheikh Jarer's Oromo Islamic Liberation Front (OIF) based in northeastern Hararghe. The OIF clashed with the SNM on several occasions, particularly after 1988. Nevertheless, political division within the Oromos and The Somali government's closure of the main Oromo Liberation Front office in Mogadishu in 1982, lack of coordination with the Western Somali Liberation Front, and the SNM's control of the northern border inhibited sustained insurgent operations into Ethiopia.

== Aftermath and Capture of Sheikh Belissa ==
In January 1991, the SNM invaded Awdal where the last concentration of Oromo militias were located, Along with Somali army forces and Gadabursi militias. The SNM met these groups at the Battle of Dilla (1991), which ended in a decisive SNM victory. A few weeks later Borama, The capital of the Awdal region fell to the SNM following the Battle of Borama (1991). In January of the same year, SNM forces captured Sheikh Ibrahim Belissa. He was handed over to Ethiopian authorities, where he remained in custody until the fall of the Derg regime in May 1991. His capture triggered a wave of inter communal violence between Oromo and Isaaq populations along the border regions inside Ethiopia, Leading to large losses of lives on both sides.
