= Baligubadle District =

District in Maroodi Jeex, Somaliland

Coordinates: 9.5625°N 44.0697°E

Baligubadle District Degmada Baligubadle
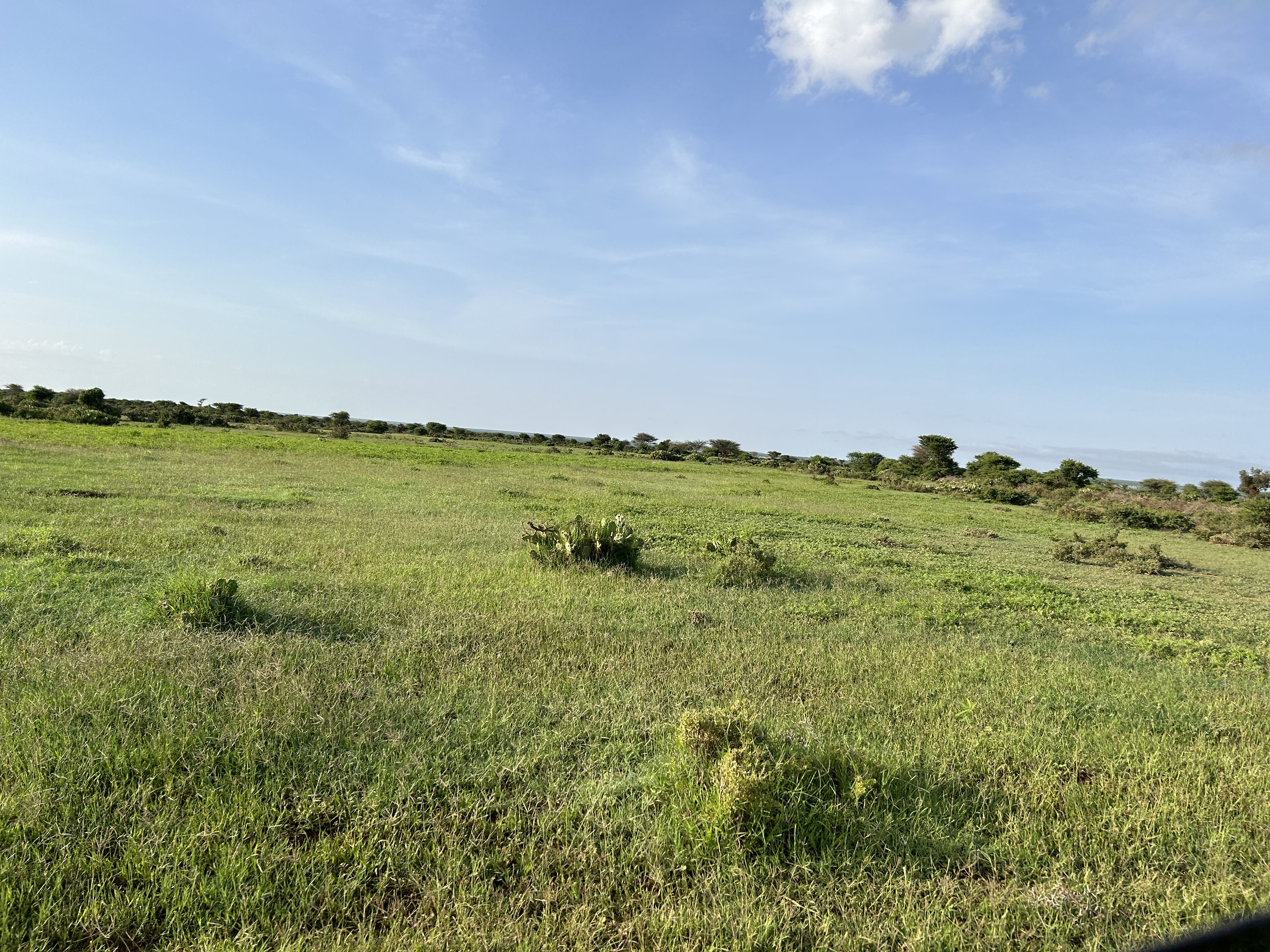

- Location of Baligubadle District in Maroodi Jeex, Somaliland
- Country: Somaliland
- Region: Maroodi Jeex
- Capital: Baligubadle

Government
  - Mayor: Shiine Abdi Hayaan
- Time zone: UTC+3 (EAT)

Baligubadle District (Somali: Degmada Baligubadle) is a district in the Maroodi Jeex region of Somaliland. The district was created in 2019 and was carved out of the wider Hargeisa District. The capital of the district is Baligubadle. which straddles the border with the Somali Region of Ethiopia.

== Economy ==
The district's inhabitants are mostly pastoralist whereby the local economy is predominantly dependent on livestock trade, however small-scale rain fed farming is also practiced.

== Demographics ==
The Baligubadle town has approximately 18,000 inhabitants. The district is wholly dominated by the Arap clan and sacad muuse, part of the wider Isaaq clan-family.

== Successive Governors ==
- Maxamed Cabdi Muxumed (Shiine)
- Shiine Cabdi Hayaan

== History ==
In September 1990, Garad Abdiqani Garad Jama visited Baligubadle and agreed to a peace agreement with the SNM. This also meant reconciliation between the clans that had been at odds with each other in the region, and was one of the major factors in the restoration of Somaliland's independence.

In 2002, the Somaliland Local Government Act was enacted and Baligubadle District became District C of the grade A-D (A being the highest).

In December 2012, the Baligubadle district assembly elected Cabdi Iimaan Jaamac (Gurey) of the UCID party as mayor.

In April 2015, the mayor, Abdi Iman Jama "Gurei," was beaten and seriously injured. It is believed that this was due to an attempt by the local government to remove an illegally constructed building.

In September 2015, Ethiopian troops reportedly crossed the Baligubadle border into Somaliland and shot and killed two civilians.

In March 2016, the Ethiopian government closed the border at Baligubadle. The reason for this has not been disclosed, but is believed to be related to the start of election registration in the region.

In January 2018, a new earth dam was constructed with the support of UNCP.

In October 2018, the Baligubadle Assembly removed Mayor Cabdi Iimaan Jaamac and elected Aadan Cali Xasan. Hawd Governor Yaaasiin Axmed Shide also expressed support for this appointment.

In June 2020, Baligubadle was damaged by torrential rains.

In June 2021, Shiine Cabdi Hayaan was elected mayor.

In May 2022, the Somaliland government proposed that Baligubadle District, which is considered District C, be elevated to District B. If this happens, the number of councilors will increase from one to eleven.

In March 2024, the Hawd Region and Baligubadle District administrations held a meeting to prevent the spread of diarrhea from Ethiopia.

== See also ==
- Administrative divisions of Somaliland
- Regions of Somaliland
- Districts of Somaliland
