= Muse Jama Godad =

Traditional elder of Somaliland (1932–2005)

Suldaan Sheikh Muuse Jaamac Goodaad
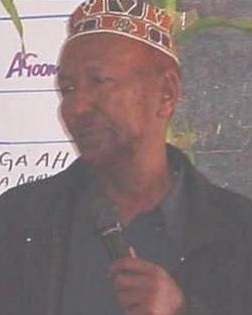

Suldaan of the Hebjire of the Habar 'Affan, Gadabuursi
- Reign: 1956–2005
- Born: 1932; Borama, British Somaliland
- Died: 10 July 2005 (aged 72–73); Djibouti

Suldaan Sheikh Muse Jama Godad (Somali: Suldaan Sheikh Muuse Jaamac Goodaad; 1932 – 10 July 2005) was a traditional elder of Somaliland. He participated in the Somaliland independence movement as a non-member of the Somali National Movement (which was the main force behind the revolutionary movement,) and signed the Somaliland Declaration of Independence as one of the representatives of Awdal. Suldaan and Sheikh (Sh.) are his titles.

== Biography ==
Muse Jama was born in Borama in Awdal region in 1932. He belonged to the Hebjire sub-clan of the Habar 'Affan clan within the Gadabuursi clan. He spent his childhood in the countryside and received a more advanced religious education in Djibouti from 1949 to 1956. He returned to his homeland in 1956 and was formally installed as Suldaan (clan elder).

In 1959, Muse Jama became secretary-general of the Borama branch of the United Somali Party (USP), and in 1960, he was appointed secretary in charge of leadership at USP headquarters. In the late 1960s, he became secretary-general of the USP as a whole. After the USP merged with the Somali National League (SNL), he became secretary in charge of leadership. In 1967, he joined a private company, but in 1968 he entered a government agency involved in trade and became the administrator of the Gabiley District. And in 1978, he became the head of transportation and logistics in Mogadish.

During the early 1991 conflict in Mogadish (the start of the Somali Civil War), Muse Jama organized northern residents at a hotel in Lafoole, on the outskirts of Mogadish, declaring the necessity of returning north to establish peace, disarm militias, and restore the independent statehood originally lost in 1960.

Relation map.

From February to March 1991, he played a central role in the peace conference held in Borama.

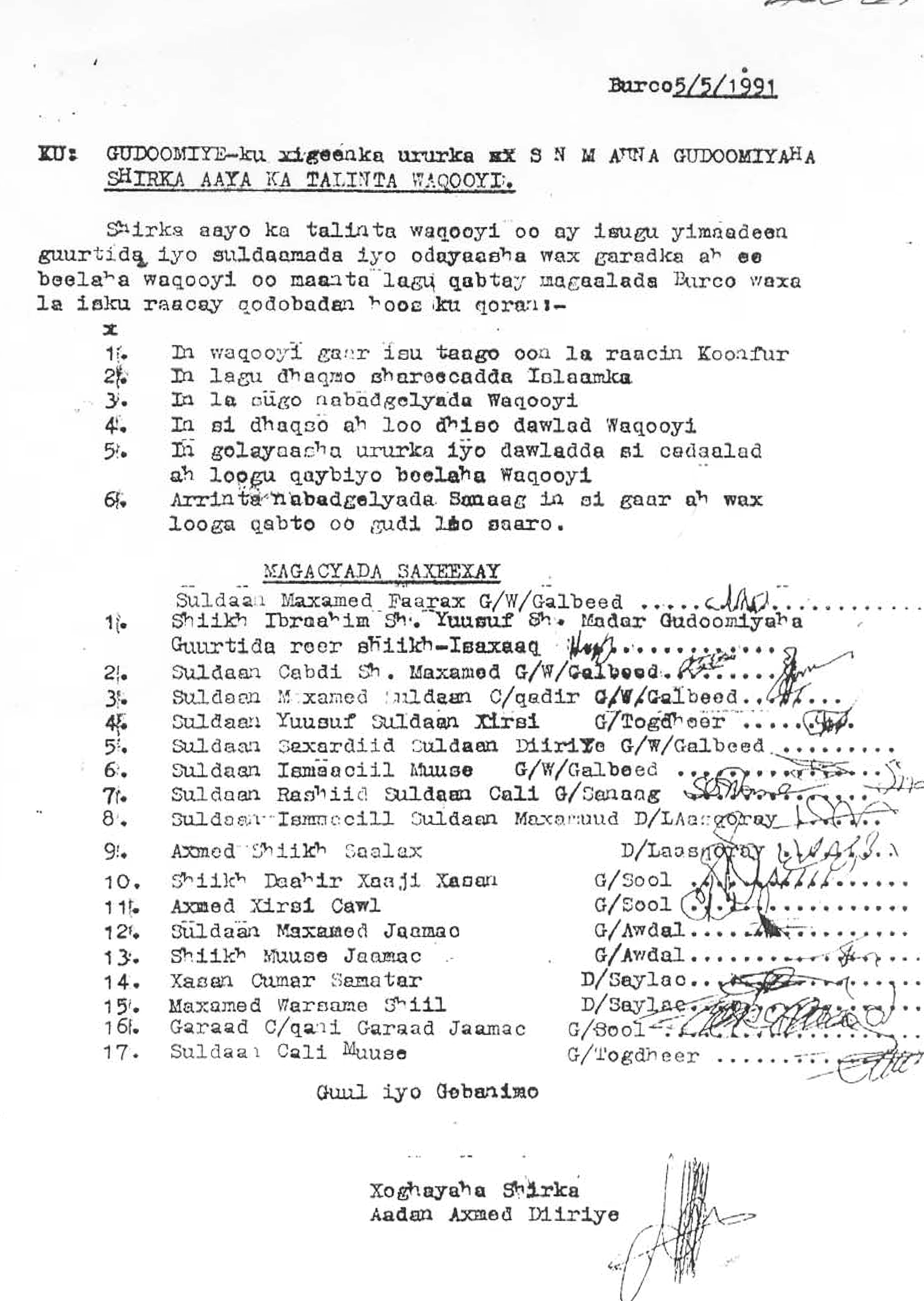
Sheikh Muse Jama was the 13th person to sign Somaliland’s 1991 Declaration of Independence

From April to May 1991, Muse Jama played a crucial role in convening the Somaliland’s traditional council of elders (gurti) in preparation for a large-scale conference in Burao. At the conference, Muse Jama stated, "We are not people who separated from Somalia, but people who have reclaimed our status as a nation." On May 5, a document known as the Somaliland Declaration of Independence was signed, and Muse Jama was among those who signed it.

He subsequently served as a mediator in disputes that arose in various regions. In April 1992, another conference was held in Borama, where he presided over a meeting of all communities in the Awdal region.

Muse Jama also played a key role in the Grand Conference of National Reconciliation held in 1993. And on that occasion, he was the third person to sign the Somaliland National Charter, in his capacity as Vice Chairman of the Somaliland Gurti. When Gurti was institutionalized as the House of Elders, he became one of its first members.

In September 2002, Muse Jama was part of a high-level peace delegation to Adhi'adeye, the Sool region. As a representative of the Guurti, he helped mediate a ceasefire between the Fiqishini (Hawiye) and Reer Cilmi (Dhulbahante) clans to resolve regional hostilities.

Muse Jama died in Djibouti on 10 July 2005. The position of Gurti was taken over by his nephew, Dahir Ali Jama (Daahir Cali Jaamac).
