= Abdilahi Husein Iman Darawal =

Somaliland politician

Abdillahi Hussein Iman Darawal عبد الله حسين إيمان دراوال
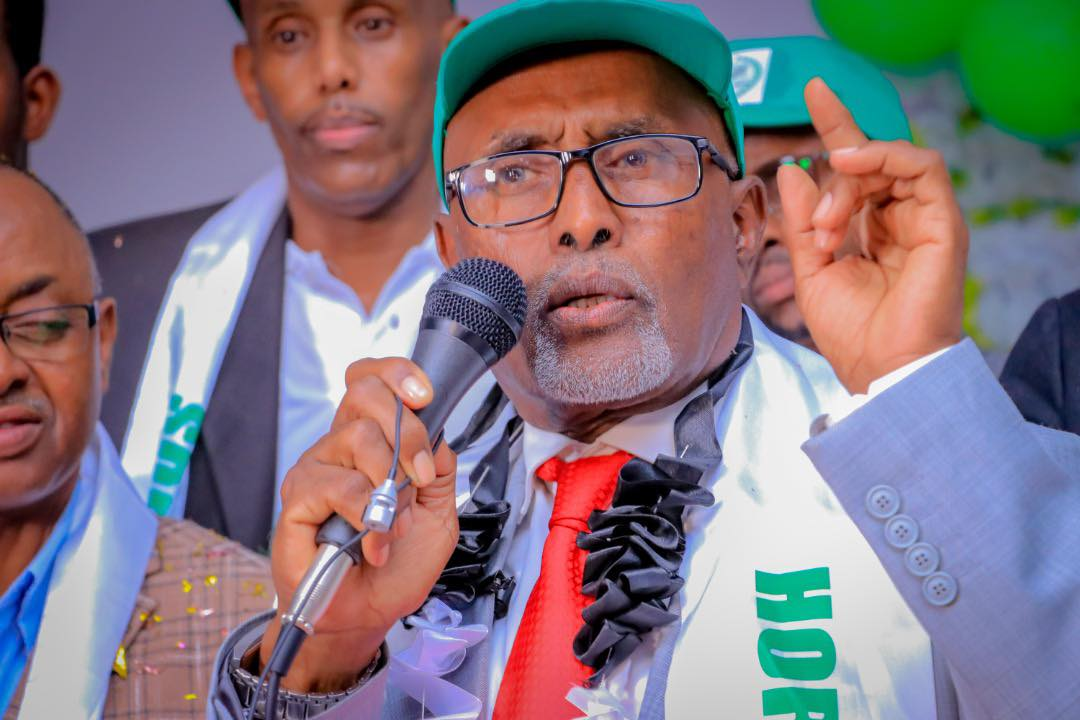

Horseed Party Chairman
- In office 2022–2024

Minister of Defence
- In office 1996–1998

Minister of Justice
- In office 1995–1996

Senior Commander of the Somali National Movement
- In office 1988–1991

Personal details
- Born: 1948 (age 77–78) Hargeisa, British Somaliland

Abdillahi Hussein Iman Darawal (Somali: Cabdilaahi Xuseen Iimaan Darawal) is a Somaliland politician and former senior SNM senior commander. The nickname "Darawal" means "driver" in Somali. Darawal belongs to the Arap clan of the wider Isaaq clan family.

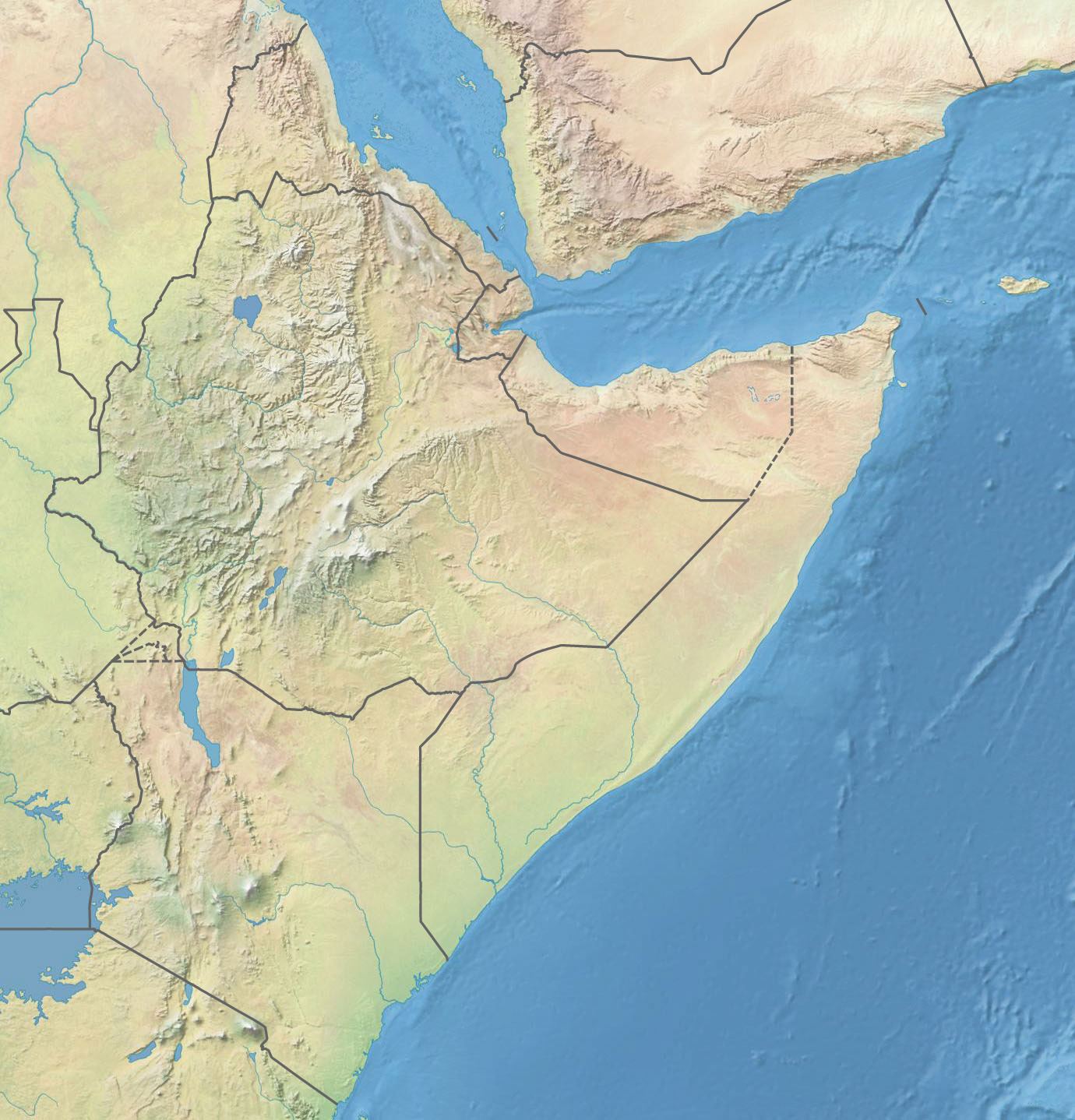
Relation map.
Bel=Beledweyne , Ber=Berbera , Bu=Buloburde, Do=Doolow , Ha=Hargeisa , Mo=Mogadishu , Od=Odessa

== Early life and education ==
Darawal was born in Hargeisa in 1948. He attended the Axmed Gurey primary and intermediate school in Hargeisa, spending grades three and four in Berbera, and later completed secondary education at Faarax Oomaar High School in Hargeisa.

== Career ==
In 1970 he was sent by the Somali government to the Soviet Union, where he studied artillery at Odessa. He returned in 1973 with the rank of xidigle (lieutenant).

After his return from the Soviet Union, Darawal served in the Somali National Army in Beledweyne, Mogadishu, Buloburde and with the First Division in the west. He took part in the Ogaden War of 1977, operating around Doolow. Following the failed 1978 coup attempt against President Siad Barre, Darawal, who had remained loyal to the government and did not join the mutinous officers, was among those commended for his allegiance and reliability. He received official recognition for standing with the regime during the crisis, although he was not reported as playing a direct operational role in suppressing the coup.

=== Somali national movement ===
In 1988, amid the government’s wider crackdown following the SNM offensive in the north, he was detained in Mogadishu for around seven months. Local accounts state that he had been suspected of clandestine contacts with the Somali National Movement, and more broadly many Isaaq officers were targeted at this time. After his release he crossed into Ethiopia and formally joined the SNM as a senior commander.

Within the SNM he rose quickly to a senior command position, overseeing military units on the northern front. He was credited with organizing supply line interdiction between Hargeisa and Berbera, coordinating cross-border logistics from Ethiopia, and training new SNM recruits. Darawal also worked closely with the Sheikh San'ani Brigade, one of the most prominent SNM units, which played a decisive role in cutting government supply lines and mounting offensives around Hargeisa and Berbera.

=== After Somaliland independence ===
Following Somaliland's declaration of independence in 1991, Darawal was appointed Army Chief of Staff and later held several ministerial posts. He served as Director General of the Ministry of Transport (1993), Minister of Justice (Somaliland) (1995–1996), Minister of Defence (Somaliland) (1996–1998), and Minister of Rehabilitation, Reconstruction and Resettlement (1998). In 2006 he was appointed Minister of Health under President Dahir Riyale Kahin.

=== Later career ===
After a period away from frontline politics, Darawal re-emerged in the 2010s as a political commentator. He gave several interviews and speeches addressing Somaliland’s negotiations with Somalia, often taking a critical stance on government policies.

In 2022 he became chairman of the newly formed Horseed Political Association, positioning it as an opposition platform. Under his leadership, Horseed advocated for governance reform, military veterans’ welfare, and the return of displaced persons. He served as chairman until 2024, when the political association dissolved after placing outside the top three in the national political party election.

== See also ==
- Politics of Somaliland
- Somali National Movement
- Sheikh San'ani Brigade
