= Hawd Region =

Region of Somaliland

Coordinates: 09°01′00″N 44°01′00″E

Hawd Region was a region in Somaliland. The Hawd Region was created by President Dahir Riyale Kahin on May 15, 2008.

It sits at a DMS latitude of 8° 0 min 0 sec and a DMS longitude of 46° 30 min 0 sec. Its capital is the town of Baligubadle.

The Haud is primarily inhabited by the Isaaq clan, most notably the Arap and the Habar Awal its part of the wider Isaaq family's core traditional territory.

== See also ==
- Administrative divisions of Somaliland
- Regions of Somaliland
- Districts of Somaliland
- Somalia–Somaliland border
