= List of international declarations =

This is a chronological list of international declarations, declarations of independence, declarations of war, etc.

== 1300-1599 ==
Year	Name	Summary	References
1320	Declaration of Arbroath	Proclamation of Scottish independence.	

== 1600-1699 ==
Year	Name	Summary	References
1617	Declaration of Sports (Note: Also known as the Book of Sports.)	Issued by James I of England; lists the sports that were permitted on Sundays and other holy days.	
1660	Declaration of Breda	King Charles II of England, while in exile, proclaims the conditions of his acceptance of the crown of England.	
1672	Royal Declaration of Indulgence	Charles II of England attempts to extend religious freedom to Protestant nonconformists in his realms.	
1676	Declaration of the People (Note: Also known formally as the Declaration of the People of Virginia.)	Issued by Nathaniel Bacon; proclaims the colonial governor of Virginia as corrupt.	
1687	Declaration of Indulgence (Note: Also known as the Declaration for the Liberty of Conscience.)	Establishes freedom of religion in England.	
1688	Declaration of Reasons	William III of England legitimizes his overthrowing of James II of England.	

== 1700-1799 ==
Year	Name	Summary	References
1774	Declaration of Colonial Rights (Note: Also known as the Declaration of Rights or the Declaration of Rights and Grievances.)	Adopted by the First Continental Congress; proclaims the rights of the Thirteen Colonies.	
1775	Mecklenburg Declaration of Independence	North Carolina establishes strong anti-British resolutions.	
1776	United States Declaration of Independence	The United States proclaims its independence from the Kingdom of Great Britain.	
1791	Declaration of Pillnitz	Calls on European powers to intervene if Louis XVI of France is threatened.	

== 1800-1899 ==
Year	Name	Summary	References
1811	Venezuelan Declaration of Independence	Venezeluans proclaim their secession from the Kingdom of Spain.	
1816	Argentine Declaration of Independence	The Congress of Tucumán declares Argentine independence.	
1836	Texas Declaration of Independence	Formal declaration of independence of the Republic of Texas from Mexico.	
1848	Declaration of Sentiments	Records establishment of the first women's rights convention.	
1856	Declaration of Paris	Abolishes privateering.	
1868	St Petersburg Declaration	Delegates agree to prohibit the use of less deadly explosives.	
1898	Philippine Declaration of Independence	Proclaims the sovereignty and independence of the Philippine Islands from Spanish imperial rule.	

== 1900-1999 ==
Year	Name	Summary	References
1905	Declaration of Boulogne	Defines "Esperantism" as a movement to promote the widespread use of Esperanto.	
1909	Declaration of London	An international code of maritime law.	
1916	Proclamation of the Irish Republic	Proclaims Irish independence from the United Kingdom of Great Britain and Ireland.	
1919	Declaration of Independence (Ireland)	Adopted by Dáil Éireann; "ratifies" the 1916 Proclamation.	
1923	Declaration of the Rights of the Child	Protects the rights of children; drafted by Eglantyne Jebb, endorsed in 1924, and adopted by the UN in 1946 and in 1959.	
1944	Declaration of Philadelphia	Current charter of the International Labour Organization.	
1945	Declaration of Avellaneda	The political platform of Argentina's Radical Civic Union.	
1945	Indonesian Declaration of Independence	Proclaims Indonesia independent from Dutch imperial rule.	
1947	Proclamation of the Indian Independence	Proclaims India's independence from the United Kingdom of Great Britain.	
1948	Israel's Declaration of Independence	Proclaims the establishment of the State of Israel within the British Mandate of Palestine.	
1948	Universal Declaration of Human Rights	Ratified in December 1948 by the United Nations, the UDHR defines a fundamental list of human rights to be defended by all nations of the world.	
1949	London Declaration	Allows republics to be member of the British Commonwealth, creates the position of Head of the Commonwealth, and renames the organisation as the 'Commonwealth of Nations'.	
1950	Declaration of Conscience	Senator Margaret Chase Smith criticizes the tactics of HUAC and (without naming him) Senator Joe McCarthy.	
1955	Declaration of Neutrality	Austria proclaims itself a permanently neutral nation.	
1964	Declaration of Helsinki	Sets ethical principles for the medical community regarding human experimentation.	
1965	Rhodesia's Unilateral Declaration of Independence	Rhodesia proclaims itself independent from the United Kingdom on 11 November 1965, by the administration of Ian Smith, whose Rhodesian Front party opposed black majority rule in the then British colony.	
1968	Declaration of Geneva	Proclaims physicians' dedication to the humanitarian goals of medicine.	
1988	Palestinian Declaration of Independence	Proclaims the establishment of the independent State of Palestine.	
1990	Declaration of Independence (Transnistria)	Proclaims the withdrawal of Transnistria from the Moldavian SSR.	
1991	Declaration of Windhoek	Statement of press freedom principles put together by African newspaper journalists.	
1991	Somaliland Declaration of Independence	Declare a Republic of Somaliland and regard the territory as the successor state to the short-lived independent State of Somaliland.	

== 2000-current ==
Year	Name	Summary	References
2001	The Doha Declaration	Adopted by the WTO Ministerial Conference of 2001; reaffirms flexibility of TRIPS member states in circumventing intellectual property rights for better access to essential medicines.	
2002	The Amsterdam Declaration	Statement of the fundamental principles of modern Humanism passed unanimously by the International Humanist and Ethical Union.	
2002	Geneva Declaration on the Future of the WIPO	Focuses on the needs of developing countries with respect to intellectual property legislation.	
2006	Declaration of Montreal (Note: Also known as the Declaration of Montreal on Lesbian, Gay, Bisexual, and Transgender Human Rights.)	A starting point in the listing of the international LGBT movement's demands.	
2007	Declaration on the Rights of Indigenous Peoples	A Declaration adopted by the United Nations General Assembly during its 61st session at UN Headquarters in New York City on 13 September 2007 setting an important standard for the treatment of the planet's 370 million indigenous people.	
2008	2008 Kosovo declaration of independence	A controversial declaration that was seen by some as setting a precedent for other secessionist movements.	
2020	Great Barrington Declaration	A declaration opposing the blanket lockdowns introduced in response to the Covid-19 pandemic.	
