= Mohamed Sultan Farah =

Sultan of the Arap (1940s-2003)

Sultan Mohamed Sultan Farah Sultan mahad Suldaan Maxamed Suldaan Faarax سلطان محمد بن فارح
- Sultan of the Arap
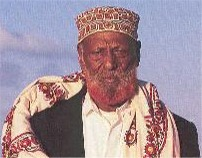
- Sultan Mohamed Sultan Farah
- Reign: 1940s - 2000s
- Predecessor: Sultan Farah
- Successor: Sultan Umar Sultan Mohamed
- Born: 1921; Naasa Hablood, Somaliland
- Died: June 11, 2003 (aged 81–82); Hargeisa, Somaliland
- Burial: Masalaha Cemetery; Hargeisa, Somaliland
- Religion: Sunni Islam

Sultan Mohamed Sultan Farah (Somali: Suldaan Maxamed Suldaan Faarax, Arabic: سلطان محمد بن فارح) (1921–2003) was the sultan for the Arap clan, part of the wider Isaaq clan family and the first traditional leader to join the Somali National Movement. An influential figure who commanded the 10th division of the SNM and lead the demobilization process of the organisation in Somaliland. The Arap's decision to demobilise applied pressure on other clans to follow suit. playing an instrumental role in the Somaliland peace process.

== Demobilisation Initiatives 1993 ==
The Somaliland government sought unify SNM armed factions to ensure demobilisation and reintegration of ex-combatants into society.

In early 1994, a well-staged ceremony was held in the Hargeisa football stadium, whereby Somaliland which clans publicly hand over their weapons to the government led by Muhammad Haji Ibrahim Egal.

== Death ==
Sultan Mohamed died on 11 June 2003. His son and successor, Sultan Omar Sultan Mohamed was crowned in a ceremony at the Masalaha Cemetery in southern Hargeisa after his burial.

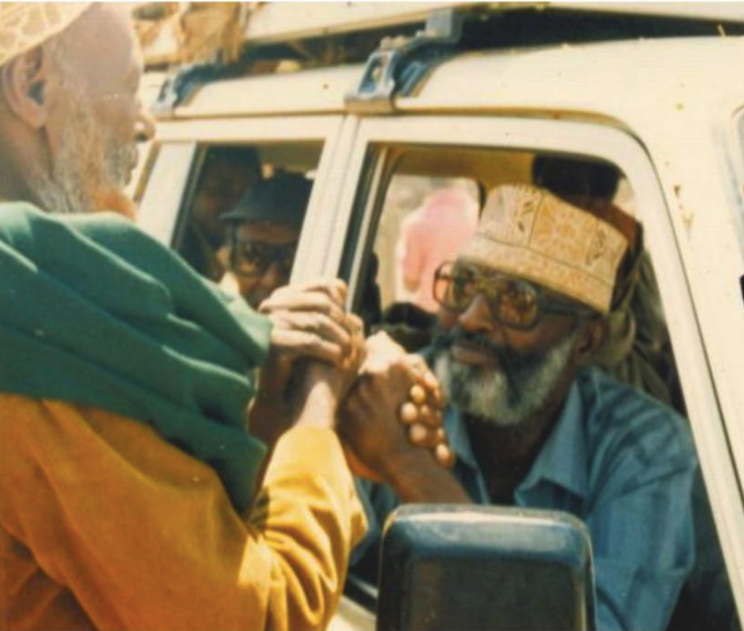
Sultan Farah of the Arap and Garaad Abdiqani of the Dhulbahante in Baligubadle during the Somaliland peace process

== See also ==
- Arap
- Sheikh San'ani Brigade
- Somali National Movement
- Somaliland Peace Process
- Politics of Somaliland
