= Ahmed Osman Guelleh =

Somali Businessperson (born 1959)

- Axmed Cisman Geelle
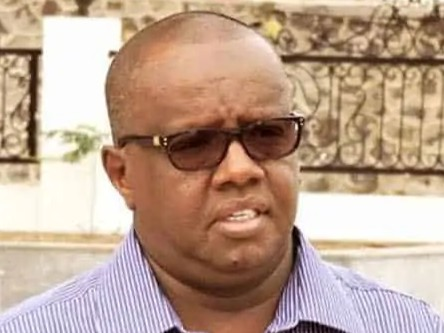
- Born: 1959 (age 66–67)
- Occupation: Businessperson

Ahmed Osman Guelleh (Somali: Axmed Cismaan Geelle), as known Ina Geele-arab, is a Somali businessperson.

== Biography ==
His father started a business in Djibouti in 1949 and expanded it into shipping, construction, and real estate.

In 1959, he was born. He belongs to the Arap of Isaaq clan. He received his elementary education and part of his secondary education in Djibouti, and was sent abroad for training in English and business management. He graduated from the University of Oxford.

=== Somaliland Beverage Industries ===
After returning to Djibouti, he joined the Djibouti branch of Inchcape Shipping Services as an accountant, was promoted to head of finance, and later became general manager.

He then joined Massida Transit, a competitor. After that, he started his own company. Around 1985, he held the Coca-Cola franchise rights for Somaliland, but lost when the Somali Civil War broke out.

He founded the construction company Alliance Construction, and in August 2010, together with Maersk Djibouti Container and Freight Station (MDCFS) and Damco, secured exclusive rights to bunkering and cargo handling operations at the Port of Doraleh, eventually acquiring control of Inchcape Shipping Services Djibouti from Dubai World.

In late 2010, he reacquired the Coca-Cola franchise rights. He planned to begin bottling operations in 2011, investing $10 million in brand-new machinery from Austria and Italy. The plan called for bottling 11,000 bottles per hour, employing 130 people, and generating an annual profit of $3.2 million. He founded Somaliland Beverage Industries (SBI) in May 2012, and the amount invested was $17 million. The opening ceremony for SBI's Coca-Cola plant, held in May 2012, was attended by Jama Mahmoud Haid—the brother of the First Lady of Djibouti—as well as Djibouti government ministers and senior police and military officials.

=== Dispute with the Djibouti President and relocation to Somaliland ===
In 2013, Djama Mahamoud Haid, the brother of the Djibouti First Lady Kadra Mahmoud Haid and governor of the Central Bank of Djibouti, passed away. Kadra claimed inheritance rights to a building owned by her brother, but she failed in late 2015. During the 2016 Djiboutian presidential election, he served as a key campaign official for Ismaïl Omar Guelleh as a member of the Central Committee of Djibouti's ruling party, the People's Rally for Progress (RPP). After that, he received a $45 million investment from a company run by his relatives and expanded into the production of dairy products and flour.

First Lady Kadra then pressured Djibouti authorities to carry out a series of harassing measures, including the seizure of the building through the bank, the suspension of construction on the East Africa Bank headquarters, a tax audit, and the exertion of pressure on customers. In September 2017, Djibouti authorities issued an arrest warrant for Ahmed Osman Guelleh. At the time, he was staying in the UAE, and since he learned of this fact before returning to Djibouti, he fled to Hargeisa, the capital of Somaliland.

In February 2018, the French Ambassador to Kenya informed Ahmed Osman Guelleh of the bankruptcy rulings issued by courts in France and Djibouti, and also informed him that a complaint against GSK had been filed with Interpol.

In March 2018, the vice president and the Djibouti branch manager of BCI Mer Rouge (BCIMR) arrived in Somaliland and claimed that GSK and Ahmed Osman Guelleh owed a total of $20 million in cash. The bank alleges that GSK defaulted on repayment it had taken out to invest in the construction of a Coca-Cola plant in Hargeisa.

The Somaliland government established a committee consisting of the Minister of Foreign Affairs, the former Governor of the Central Bank, and the Commissioner General of Police, and reached an agreement with the French ambassador to proceed with recovery proceedings in Somaliland's courts, without taking into account the decisions of the courts in France or Djibouti. Meanwhile, they issued an official statement condemning Ahmed Osman Guelleh for making false reports to the government regarding the debt.

In April 2019, four of his companies in Djibouti were transferred to the family of President Ismaïl Omar Guelleh, while the others were shut down. His company "360 Stevedoring" was taken over by Sacad, the brother of President Guelleh, who also serves as the administrator of the Port of Djibouti. His company "Multivision" was taken over by Tomoo, the husband of President Guelleh’s daughter, Faadumo. "Jib Events," a company owned by his wife, was transferred to Tolmond Almis Mohamud Xayd, the niece of President Guelleh’s wife, Khadra Maxamuud Xayd. His company "Djibouti Container Freight Station" was transferred to Nazli Cabdala Kamil, Khadra’s daughter from a previous marriage. Furthermore, President Guelleh demanded that Somaliland President Muse Bihi Abdi freeze the assets he owns in Somaliland.

Meanwhile, Somaliland President Muse Bihi Abdi, who had previously prioritized coordination with Djibouti, proposed a meeting with businessmen and politicians from the Arap clan—including Ahmed Osman Guelleh—in response to growing criticism of the government from Somaliland citizens and traditional elders. However, Ahmed Osman Guelleh rejected this request. In addition, the acting leader of Waddani, Somaliland's main opposition party, strongly criticized the Somaliland Presidency’s response and argued that discussions regarding repayment of the bank loan would only be possible once the Djibouti government had returned the assets confiscated from him in Djibouti.

In 2021, the Somaliland government revoked the operating license of Ethiopian Shipping Lines, where Ahmed Osman Guelleh served as representative, and transferred management rights to an individual suspected of being a relative of the Somaliland president. As a result, the Somaliland president and Ahmed Osman Guelleh held talks and agreed that Ahmed Osman Guelleh would once again serve as representative.

In September 2023, the Madagascan weekly newspaper L'Écho du Sud published a list of the 10 wealthiest people in Djibouti, reporting that he ranked second with a net worth of $160 million and is involved in a wide range of businesses, from construction to shipping.
