= Battle of Dilla (1991) =

Large scale engagement during the final stages of the Somaliland War of Independence

- Part of Somaliland War of Independence
Date	January 1991
Location	Dilla, Awdal, Somali Democratic Republic (Now Somaliland)
Result	SNM victory
Territorial changes	The SNM captures all of Awdal from the remaining Somali troops Complete destruction of Dilla and its surroundings

Belligerents
Somali National Movement	Somalia: Gadabursi militias; Oromo militias

Commanders and leaders
Abdirahman Aw Ali	Mohamed Hanfidhe; Sheikh Belissa (POW)

Strength
unknown	unknown

Casualties and losses
Minimum	almost 1000 killed

The Battle of Dilla was a large scale engagement during the final stages of the Somaliland War of Independence. It occurred in January 1991, when forces of the 99th Division of the Somali National Movement pursued retreating units of the Somali Armed Forces from Hargeisa toward the town of Dilla. The battle was the last major engagement between Somalia and the SNM, as the Somali Government fully collapsed the same month.

== Background ==
In 1987, Siad Barre, the president of Somalia, frustrated by the lack of success of the army against insurgents from the Somali National Movement in the north of the country, entered negotiations with the Ethiopian government, offering to abandon Somalia's territorial claim over Ethiopia's Somali Region in exchange for the cessation of Ethiopian support to the SNM. Ethiopia agreed, and a formal accord was signed on 3 April 1988, including provisions to end mutual assistance to insurgent groups operating across their borders. This agreement significantly constrained SNM operations along the frontier, compelling the movement to shift strategy toward direct offensives northern urban centers. According to Daniel Compagnon, this pressure left the SNM with little alternative but to escalate its campaign by targeting major المدن in the north. The broader context of escalating repression and counterinsurgency violence contributed to what Robin Cohen described as one of the “worst civil wars in Africa”.

The SNM initially planned operations targeting Adadley, Mandera and Berbera, before advancing on Hargeisa; however, the plan was revised by the SNM High Command to prioritize the symbolic capture of key urban centers, particularly Hargeisa, over a strategy of logistical encirclement. While Berbera remained under government control and functioned as a critical supply hub, the SNM achieved early successes by capturing both Hargeisa and Burao within days. These initial gains preceded a sustained Somali government counteroffensive beginning in June 1988, transforming the conflict into a prolonged siege across major towns in Somaliland. During this period, extensive aerial bombardment, mass killings, and other atrocities were carried out by government forces against civilian populations, resulting in tens of thousands of deaths estimated between 50,000 and 200,000 in what later became known as the Isaaq Genocide.

Throughout the campaign, the Gadabursi clan in the western Awdal region of Somaliland had been fighting on Barre's side against the SNM, with the Barre regime arming them and encouraging them to undertake reprisals against the Isaaq. Therefore, when the SNM reached Awdal in early 1991, local civilians were concerned that the Gadabursi and the Issa would be fighting the neighbouring Jibril Abokor sub-division of the Sa'ad Musa/Habr Awal, and that they wanted revenge.

In January 1991, after 4 years of intermittent siege, The SNM captured Hargeisa and Burao, A week later the coastal city of Berbera fell. Somali garrisons fled to Awdal where they would join with Gadabursi and Oromo militias known as the Somali Democratic Alliance. SNM troops subsequently preceded them and invaded Awdal, Where they would meet the Somali Army and allied tribal militias in the small town of Dilla.

== Battle ==
The SNM arrived in Dilla in late January 1991 and encountered fierce resistance from a coalition of Gadabursi and Oromo militias, supported by units of the Somali National Army. The ensuing battle was intense and involved the use of heavy artillery, resulting in significant casualties on both sides. The confrontation formed part of the broader final phase of the Somali Civil War, during which state forces and allied militias attempted to halt the advance of SNM units operating in the region.

Despite the resistance, SNM forces eventually gained the upper hand and succeeded in routing the opposing forces, who withdrew toward Borama and Zeila. The aftermath of the battle led to widespread displacement, with much of the civilian population fleeing across the Ethiopian border to the Aw Barre refugee camp. In the period following the fighting, Dilla was reportedly looted, and some residents accused members of the Jibril Abokor sub-clan of the Isaaq of responsibility, reflecting the complex and contested nature of inter-clan relations during the conflict.

== Aftermath ==
Much of Dilla was destroyed in the battle, though civilian casualties were minimal as the bulk of the inhabitants fled upon the impending SNM approach. After the battle, the SNM captured the town of Dilla and then continued into the main Gadabursi town of Borama. After a short battle, Borama fell to the SNM, and the civilians expected a retaliatory massacre of the inhabitants. However, The SNM leadership withdrew their units after a mere 24 hours to allow discussions to take place without the shadow of occupation. This was eased by the fact that a highranking commander of the SNM present in Awdal, Abdirahman Aw Ali (nicknamed Tolwaa), was Gadabursi himself, of the Rer Jibril Yunis subclan.

The town of Borama was affected by extreme famine caused by the long duration of the war and food shortages. When Abdirahman Aw Ali entered his hometown of Borama, the people saw the SNM forces as the best solution to the unbearable situation in the town. Abdirahman, in collaboration with clan elders, ordered that the shopkeepers reopen their stores and sell their commodities at an affordable price. Before, they had closed in the hope of raising the prices of the dry rations. After negotiations outside Borama, The Gadabursi would formally declare support for the SNM, where they would support them in their future military activities, including a Djiboutian backed invasion of Zeila by Issa secessionists seeking to unite western Awdal with Djibouti.
