= Umar Sultan Mohamed =

Sultan of the Arap (2003–2021)

Sultan Omar Sultan Mohamed Suldaan Cumar Suldaan Maxamed سلطان عمر سلطان محمد سلطان فارح
- Sultan of the Arap
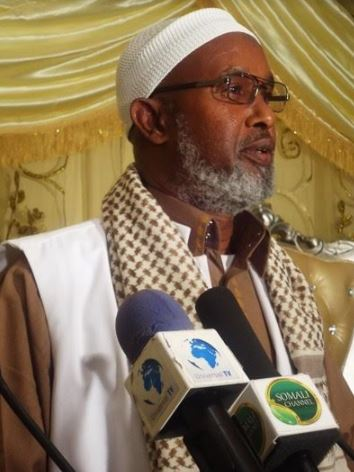
- Reign: 11 June 2003 - 14 September 2021
- Predecessor: Sultan Mohamed Sultan Farah
- Successor: Sultan Abdirahman Sultan Umar
- Born: 1956; Hargeisa, Somaliland
- Died: September 14, 2021 (aged 64–65); Turkey
- Burial: Masalaha Cemetery; Hargeisa, Somaliland
Names
- Sultan Omar Sultan Mohamed Sultan Farah Sultan Mahad
- Father: Sultan Mohamed Sultan Farah
- Mother: Sahra Haji Jama
- Religion: Sunni Islam

Sultan Omar Sultan Mohamed Sultan Farah (Somali: Suldaan Cumar Suldaan Maxamed Suldaan Faarax) was the sultan of the Arap clan, part of the wider Isaaq clan-family, from 2003 until his death in 2021.

== Biography ==
Sultan Omar was born in Hargeisa, Somaliland in 1956. He began his Quranic education in Hargeisa and later enrolled at the Falaaxo (Al-Falaax) School. After completing his studies he pursued his secondary education from 1973 to 1976 at the renowned Allaahi Institute, affiliated with Al-Azhar University.

In 1977, he graduated from the institute and joined the Hallane Training School. In 1978, he participated in the Somali National Services Campaign for public sector employment.

In 1979, the late Sultan Omar was admitted to the Somali National University in Mogadishu, specializing in the field of geology and water sciences. He graduated in 1982. That same year, he began his first job at the Ministry of Minerals and Water Resources under the government of Mohamed Siad Barre, specifically in the Minerals Department.

Sultan Omar worked for international oil exploration companies, including Chevron and Conoco (Western Geophysical). In 1984, he was appointed as the Minerals and Water Coordinator of the Northern Regions, overseeing the six regions from Awdal to Nugaal under the Somali government.

Sultan Omar played a significant role in the Somali National Movement (SNM) during the Somaliland War of Independence. From 1988 to 1991, he contributed to organizing the SNM's military campaigns and operations. He also supported his father, Sultan Mohamed Sultan Farah, who was a key figure in laying the foundation for the SNM's struggle and the peace-building efforts among the communities in Somaliland.

In 1991, Sultan Omar resumed his academic career in geology and water sciences, becoming the Director of the Minerals Department at Somaliland's Ministry of Minerals and Water Resources.

On 11 June 2023, following the passing of his father, the Sultan of the Arab clan, Sultan Mohamed Sultan Farah, Sultan Omar was crowned as his successor in a ceremony at the Masalaha Cemetery in southern Hargeisa. Sultan Omar was also an Islamic scholar and served as a preacher at several mosques in Hargeisa. He was also fluent in four languages: Somali, Arabic, English, and Italian.

== Death ==
Sultan Omar died on 14 September 2021 in a hospital in Turkey, aged 65, having held his position as Sultan for over 18 years. His body was flown to Hargeisa where he received a state burial. He was survived by his wife and six children (two sons and four daughters). He was succeeded by his son Sultan Abdirahman Sultan Umar.
