= Hassan Isse Jama =

1st vice president of Somaliland

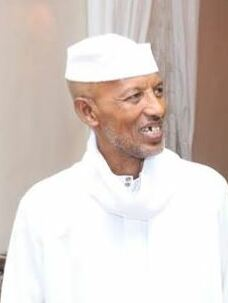
- Hassan Isse Jama in 2018

1st Vice President of Somaliland
- In office 7 June 1991 – 20 May 1993
- President: Abdirahman Ahmed Ali Tuur
- Preceded by: Office established
- Succeeded by: Abdirahman Aw Ali Farrah

Hassan Isse Jama (Somali: Xasan Ciise Jaamac) is a Somali politician and a veteran Somali National Movement (SNM) leader. He served as the first Vice President of Somaliland and was one of the founding members of the SNM.

== Career ==
Hassan Isse Jama belongs to the Arap sub-clan of the Isaaq clan-family.

Hassan studied law at Queen Mary University in London and practiced as a lawyer.

=== Somali National Movement ===
In April 1981, he became one of the founding members of the SNM, which was established in London by Somali dissidents opposed to the regime of Siad Barre. In early 1981, Hassan Isse Jama resigned from the BBC Somali Service due to his involvement with the emerging SNM. Later that year, he served as editor of the SNM's English-language bulletin Somalia Uncensored, published in London. The journal appeared as a monthly between June and December 1981, and its final issue announced the forthcoming relocation of the SNM leadership to Ethiopia.

In July 1983, at the SNM’s second congress in Harar, Ethiopia, a new constitutional clause was introduced; according to Hassan Isse Jama, it empowered the central committee to replace the leadership by a two-thirds vote. In November of the same year, at an emergency session in Jijiga, he remained on the restructured executive committee as its only civilian member, while most posts were taken over by army officers who had defected from the Somali National Army.

=== Vice President of Somaliland ===
In 1990, at the sixth congress of the Somali National Movement (SNM), held in Burao, a newly elected central committee of 99 members confirmed the organization’s leadership. During this congress, Abdirahman Ahmed Ali Tuur was elected as chairman, while Hassan Isse Jama served as vice chairman of the movement.

In May 1991, following the collapse of the Siad Barre regime, the SNM convened the Burao conference, which declared the restoration of Somaliland’s independence. At the conclusion of the conference, Abdirahman Ahmed Ali Tuur was elected as president, and Hassan Isse Jama became the first vice president of Somaliland.

In May 1993, at the Borama National Reconciliation Conference, Mohamed Haji Ibrahim Egal was elected president and Abdirahman Aw Ali Farrah became vice president, bringing the SNM-led interim administration to an end; accordingly, Hassan Isse Jama left office as vice president. (Although Jonathan Paquin's 2010 book lists Abdirahman Ahmed Ali Tuur as Hassan Isse Jama’s successor, this appears to be an isolated and likely erroneous account.)

=== Xaqsoor Party ===
In 2011, he returned to political life after a 20-year absence and founded the Xaqsoor Party to compete in the 2012 Somaliland municipal elections. He explained that the party was founded to provide an alternative to the dominant Kulmiye and UCID parties, which he argued had failed to unite the country’s emerging political associations. He stated that Xaqsoor’s mission was to promote broader political participation and reconciliation across Somaliland’s regions, bringing together citizens who felt marginalized by existing parties. In the 2012 local council elections held on 28 November, the law required that only the three associations with the highest vote shares would qualify as national political parties for the next decade. The political association Xaqsoor failed to place among the top three and therefore lost the chance to become a recognized party under the legal framework. After the 2012 municipal elections, the political association Xaqsoor lodged formal complaints alleging electoral malpractice. These protests culminated in demonstrations in early December 2012, during which clashes between supporters of Xaqsoor and security forces resulted in a number of civilian deaths and injuries. The case was submitted to the Supreme Court of Somaliland, which ultimately declined to adjudicate it, citing procedural non-compliance.

In October 2016, as former chairman of the Xaqsoor association, he publicly welcomed the selection of Abdiqadir Jirde as leader of the opposition Waddani party. In February 2017, he criticized the handling of plans to grant the United Arab Emirates a military facility at Berbera, arguing that broader public consultation should have preceded parliamentary action. During the 2017 presidential election, independent observers noted his inclusion in an informal elders’ group formed to reduce tensions between political parties. In December 2017, he attended the transfer-of-office ceremony for the incoming president in Hargeisa alongside other former national leaders.

From 2018, Hassan Isse Jama reappeared periodically in public life. In May 2018, he attended a late-night consultation at the presidential palace convened by President Muse Bihi Abdi alongside former national leaders. Earlier that month, he issued a public appeal urging restraint in political discourse amid growing tensions. On 21 January 2020, President Muse Bihi visited him at Hargeisa’s Gargaar Hospital during a period of ill health. On 20 July 2021, he accompanied former President Ahmed Mohamed Mohamoud “Silanyo” during a courtesy call on the incumbent president at the presidency in Hargeisa.

In late 2024, the Somaliland presidency hosted a consultation with former national leaders. One report noted that former vice president Hassan Isse Jama did not attend for health reasons.

Political offices
Preceded by Office established	Vice President of Somaliland; 1991 – 1993	Succeeded by Abdirahman Aw Ali Farrah

== Sources ==
- Bradbury, Mark (2008). Becoming Somaliland. London: Progressio. ISBN 9781847013101.
- Lewis, I. M. (1994). Blood and Bone: The Call of Kinship in Somali Society. Lawrenceville, NJ: Red Sea Press. ISBN 0-932415-92-X.
