= Battle of Borama (1991) =

Battle in the Somaliland War of Independence

- Part of Somaliland War of Independence
Date	4 February 1991
Location	Borama, Awdal, Somali Democratic Republic (Now Somaliland
Result	SNM victory
Territorial changes	The Somali National Movement captures the town of Borama

Belligerents
Somali National Movement	Somalia: Gadabursi militias; Oromo militias

Commanders and leaders
Abdirahman Aw Ali	Mohamed Hanfidhe (surrendered)

Strength
99th Brigade	Oromo and Gadabursi defenders

Casualties and losses
Minimum	200-300 killed

The Battle of Borama was a battle during the Somaliland War of Independence. It was the second and last battle between the Somali National Movement and the Gadabursi and Oromo militia of the Somali Democratic Alliance.

== background ==
Throughout the Somaliland War of Independence, the Gadabursi clan in the western Awdal region of Somaliland had been fighting on Barre's side against the SNM, with the Barre regime arming them and encouraging them to undertake reprisals against the Isaaq. Therefore, when the SNM reached Awdal in early 1991, local civilians were concerned that the Gadabursi and the Issa would be fighting the neighbouring Jibril Abokor sub-division of the Sa'ad Musa/Habr Awal, and that they wanted revenge.

In January 1991, in one of the final acts of the war, the 99th division of the SNM led by Colonel Ibrahim Koodbuur had pursued government forces that fled from Hargeisa to the town of Dilla. After a ferocious battle, the SNM captured the town and then continued into the main Gadabursi town of Borama.

== Battle ==
The SNM encountered minimum resistance from the local inhabitants. After a short battle outside the city the SNM captured Borama. However, because the SNM leadership believed that the Gadabursi wished to seek peace, they withdrew their units after a mere 24 hours to allow discussions to take place without the shadow of occupation. This was eased by the fact that a highranking commander of the SNM present in Awdal, Abdirahman Aw Ali (nicknamed Tolwaa), was Gadabursi himself, of the Rer Jibril Yunis subclan.

== Aftermath ==
Following the battle, Several hundred defenders were killed, Gerard Prunier in his Book The country that does not exist estimates that anywhere from 200-300 people died, While other sources mentioned higher numbers. Before the Battle, Borama was exacerbated by hunger and food shortages. When Abdirahman Aw Ali entered his hometown of Borama, the people saw the SNM forces as the best solution to the unbearable situation in the town. As part of alleviating the food shortage in Borama, Abdirahman Aw Ali Farrah, in collaboration with clan elders, ordered that the shopkeepers reopen their stores and sell their commodities at an affordable price. Before, they had closed in the hope of raising the prices of the dry rations. Most locals in Borama were armed and ready to fight, including members of the pro-Barre Gadabursi militant group, the Somali Democratic Alliance (or SDA for short), armed Oromos, and several Gadabursi subclans. The confidence of the SNM however was rewarded when a brief initial meeting in mid-February in Tulli, just outside Borama, agreed that Gadabursi delegates would attend a larger peace conference in Berbera and then resume bilateral talks immediately after that meeting had finished, this time in Borama itself.
