= Abdirahman Aw Ali Farrah =

2nd vice president of Somaliland

- عبدالرحمن أو علي فارح
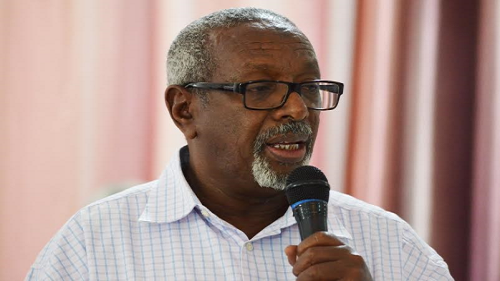
- Farrah in 2018

2nd Vice President of Somaliland
- In office May 1993 – February 1997
- President: Muhammad Haji Ibrahim Egal
- Preceded by: Hassan Isse Jama
- Succeeded by: Dahir Riyale Kahin

Personal details
- Born: Borama, Somaliland

Abdirahman Aw Ali Farrah, nicknamed Tolwaa (Somali: Cabdiraxmaan Aw Cali Faarax, Arabic: عبدالرحمن أو علي فارح) is a Somali politician who was the 2nd Vice President of Somaliland from May 1993 to February 1997.

== History ==
Abdirahman was a high-ranking SNM colonel and one of few non-Isaaq members of the organization, belonging to the Jibril Yonis sub-division of the Gadabuursi Dir clan.

=== Borama Strategy ===
Abdirahman contributed to the Somaliland peace process in the aftermath of the Somaliland War of Independence. In January 1991, in one of the final acts of the war, the 99th division of the SNM led by Colonel Ibrahim Koodbuur had pursued government forces that fled from Hargeisa to the town of Dilla. After a ferocious battle, the SNM captured the town and then continued into the main Gadabursi town of Borama. However, because the SNM leadership believed that the Gadabursi wished to seek peace, they withdrew their units after a mere 24 hours to allow discussions to take place without the shadow of occupation. This was eased by the fact that Abdirahman was present.

The difficult situation in Borama was exacerbated by hunger and food shortages. When Abdirahman Aw Ali entered his hometown of Borama, the people saw the SNM forces as the best solution to the unbearable situation in the town. As part of alleviating the food shortage in Borama, Abdirahman Aw Ali, in collaboration with clan elders, ordered that the shopkeepers reopen their stores and sell their commodities at an affordable price. Before, they had closed in the hope of raising the prices of the dry rations.

Most locals in Borama were armed and ready to fight, including members of the pro-Barre Gadabursi militant group, the Somali Democratic Alliance (or SDA for short), armed Oromos, and several Gadabursi subclans. The confidence of the SNM however was rewarded when a brief initial meeting in mid-February in Tulli, just outside Borama, agreed that Gadabursi delegates would attend a larger peace conference in Berbera and then resume bilateral talks immediately after that meeting had finished, this time in Borama itself.

=== Vice presidency ===
In May 1993, Abdirahman Aw Ali Farrah became the second Vice President of Somaliland, succeeding Hassan Isse Jama, who had served as the interim vice president. He was elected at the Borama Conference, where clan elders created a civilian government to replace the transitional military council. Farrah was chosen alongside President Muhammad Haji Ibrahim Egal, representing the Gadabuursi clan as part of a power-sharing arrangement designed to include non-Isaaq communities in the new administration.

Contemporary accounts describe the new executive of President Muhammad Haji Ibrahim Egal and Vice President Farrah as facing immediate priorities that included restoring law and order and completing the demobilisation of militia across Somaliland.

Under this initial programme, approximately 6,000 former fighters surrendered weapons and were transported to Mandheera for demobilisation and vocational training oriented to roles in a national army and police service; Farrah later estimated that militia groups in roughly 70% of Somaliland participated voluntarily in these disarmament efforts.

Farrah’s vice presidency is also noted in analyses of the Borama settlement as part of an inclusionary, clan-balanced power-sharing arrangement during the beel (clan-based) transitional phase, with the National Charter defining the posts and duties of the president and vice president and embedding consociational checks and balances.

He remained in office through the Hargeisa Conference of 1996–1997, which adopted a provisional constitution and concluded with the re-endorsement of President Egal and the election of Dahir Riyale Kahin—who, like Farrah, was a member of the Gadabuursi clan—as the next vice president in February 1997.

=== Later career ===
After leaving office in 1997, Abdirahman Aw Ali Farrah remained an influential public figure. He gave an interview in Hargeisa in September 2006 in which he was identified as a former vice president and former SNM commander, reflecting his continuing involvement in debates on statebuilding and governance in Somaliland.

In a later interview cited by constitutional research on Somaliland, he criticised elements of the 1997 transition as creating an overly strong executive, describing it as a “monster” executive, a remark used in analyses of the balance of powers during the beel-era transition.

He continued to appear in public fora; in October 2024 he spoke at commemorations of the Somaliland Police Force’s 31st anniversary in Hargeisa, delivering a retrospective on the service’s establishment and early post-war security sector reforms.

Political offices
Preceded by Hassan Isse Jama	Vice President of Somaliland; 1993 – 1997	Succeeded by Dahir Riyale Kahin
