= Dayib Gurey =

Somali guerrilla commander

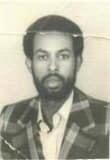
Dayib Gurey in 1999 assumed

Mohamed Ahmed 'Dayib Gurey" (Somali: Maxamed Aaaden 'Dayib Gurey') was a senior SNM senior commander who led the invasion of Hargeisa in the Somaliland War of Independence. Gurey also served as trade minister under Somaliland's first elected government under President Egal in 1993.
