= Somaliland Beverage Industries =

Beverage industry in Somaliland

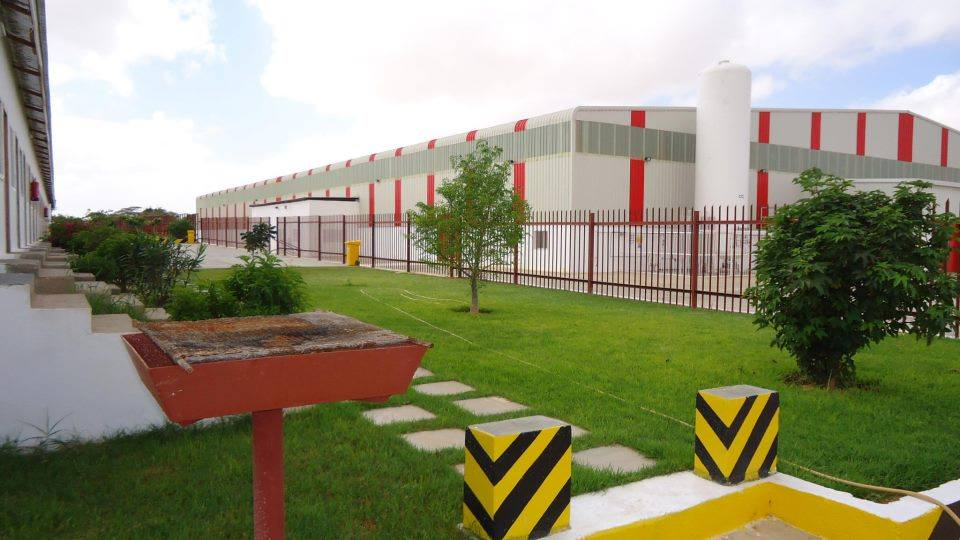
- Type: Private
- Industry: Beverages
- Founded: 2010
- Headquarters: Hargeisa, Maroodi Jeex, Somaliland
- Area served: Somaliland Burao (Burco) Regional Hub Depot
- Key people: Ahmed Osman Guelleh, Founder; Mustafe Osman Guelleh, CEO
- Products: Lis dairies Miiran juice Sprite; Coca-Cola; Dasani; Fanta
- Website: laas-group.com

Somaliland Beverage Industries abbreviated as SBI is a beverage corporation headquartered in Hargeisa, capital of Somaliland. Founded in 2010 by Ahmed Osman Guelleh, a local businessman. Based on the revenue, SBI is the largest beverage business in Somaliland.

== History ==
In early 2010, SBI was awarded a license to build & operate a Coca-Cola bottling factory in Somaliland. SBI is the country's single biggest investment to date. The opening of the $17 million Coca-Cola production plant took place on 22 May 2012 and was presided over by then-president Ahmed Mohamed Mohamoud.

== See also ==
- List of companies of Somaliland
- Economy of Somaliland
