= Declaration of Reasons =

The Declaration of Reasons was a declaration by William III, written in September 1688, legitimizing his overthrowing of James II. The declaration argued that James sought absolute power for himself in defiance of constitutional traditions in England. In order to avoid the charge of seditious libel, William accuses James's advisor of influencing James to "abdicate" the throne. James's "abdication" was made official and William and Mary's succession legitimated in the English Bill of Rights.

Historians disagree to what extent the propagandic declaration contributed to the success of the Glorious Revolution. Schwoerer and Israel argue that the Declaration was essential to the Dutch winning the propaganda war after William's arrival in England. They point to the wide distribution of the Declaration and the extent to which the claims therein dominated public debate before and during the Revolution. More modern scholarship suggests that the response by William's enemies was very effective (the government-run London Gazette had a monopoly on the newspaper market) and that the claims in the Declaration actually weakened his position with the English people. Court pamphleteers, supplementing the efforts of the press, predicted that the anarchy that would result from the overthrow of a government would lead to tyranny in attempt to control it, and James' supporters among the nobility went as far as to claim that a literal reading of the Declaration recognized James' rule as justified. Ultimately, "force and political brinksmanship" were the factors most influential in the success of the Glorious Revolution.

== Sources ==
- Tony Claydon, ‘William III's Declaration of Reasons and the Glorious Revolution’, The Historical Journal, 39, 1 (1996)
