= Somaliland Peace Process =

Peace process in Somaliland

The Somaliland Peace Process refers to the series of grassroot initiatives that brought peace to Somaliland after the collapse of the Somali Democratic Republic’s central government. In conjunction with the Somali National Movement, communities in Somaliland (formerly British Somaliland) negotiated a series of truces to end hostilities and address the grievances between the communities who were often on opposing sides to the Barre regime.

As a result, this process acted as a key building block that led to the Borama grand reconciliation conference in 1993 allowing the transfer of rule from the SNM interim government to a new civilian administration paving way for democratic rule and stability.

== The First Conference (Berbera) ==
After it was clear that the collapse of the Siad Barre regime was imminent in early 1990, traditional leaders of the Dhulbahante instigated contact with the Somali National Movement to call for a ceasefire. Talks continued amongst the parties in the Haud region of Ethiopia, whereby it was agreed that a conference would occur in the port town of Berbera between 15–21 February whereby all Northern clans would attend to arrange a preliminary ceasefire and reconciliation conference. The city port city of Berbera was chosen as the location of the first peace conference as it was the largest town to have avoided destruction by Siyaad Barre’s regime.

This conference called for the cessation of hostilities, for the promotion of peace and for the resumption of exchange of trade and socio-economic activities. Representatives from the Issa, Gadabursi, Dhulbahante and Warsangeli and Isaaq clans took part.

=== Non-reprisal policy of the SNM ===
A key accomplishment of the conference was the establishment of the SNM's policy of non-reprisal to non-Isaaq communities who fought alongside the Barre regime against the Isaaq. As a result, promoting peaceful coexistence amongst the diverse the communities of Somaliland. Moreover, this conference was followed by a meeting in April with Isaaq and non-Isaaq clan elders in Hargeisa, to make arrangements for a more formal congress with SNM representatives present.

This initial conference established a formal ceasefire and resulted in the Guurti (Council of Elders) made up of Northern clan elders being delegated to take responsibility for further peacemaking initiatives, sponsored by the SNM. Additionally, deciding on the time frame whereby a more extensive conference was to be held in Burao two months later.

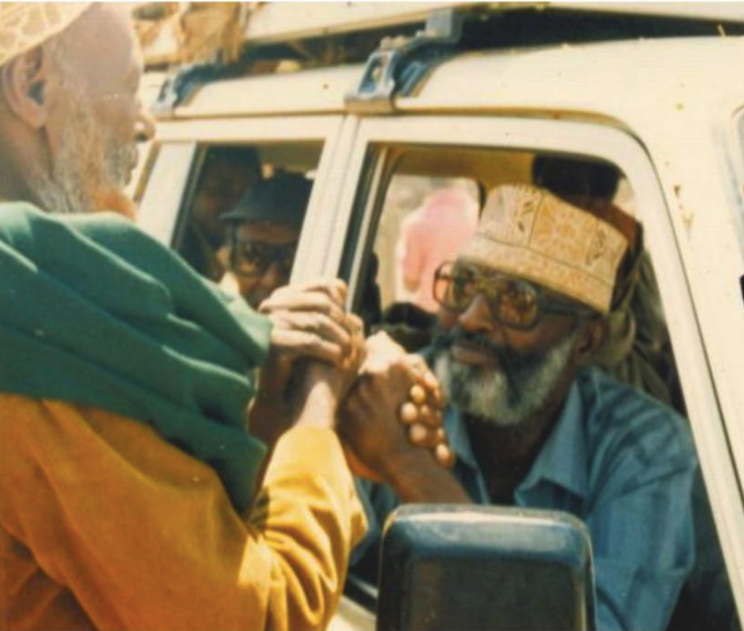
Sultan Farah of the Arap and Garaad Abdiqani of the Dhulbahante in Baligubadle during the Somaliland peace process

== Burao 1991 (The Grand Brotherhood Conference of the Northern Clans) ==
Between 27 April and 18 May 1991, a conference was called in Burao of Northern clan leaders aimed at bringing peace to Northern Somalia. Following extensive consultations between SNM leadership figures and clan representatives, it was agreed that Northern Somalia (formerly State of Somaliland) would revoke its voluntary union with the rest of Somalia to form the "Republic of Somaliland".

=== The Declaration of Independence ===
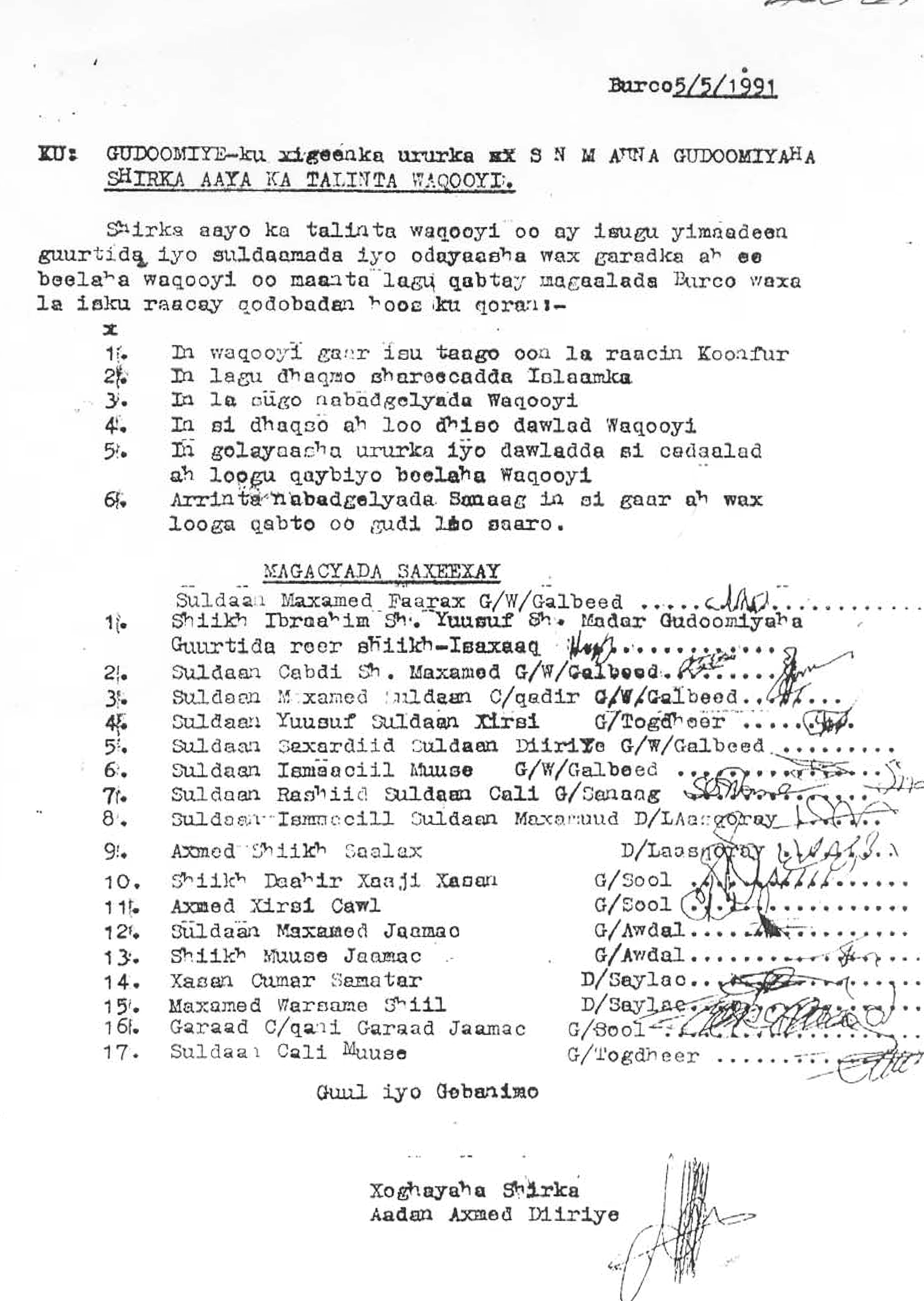
May 5 resolution of the Burao grand conference. At the second national meeting on May 18, the SNM Central Committee, with the support of a meeting of elders representing the major clans in the Northern Regions, declared the restoration of the Republic of Somaliland in the territory of the former British Somaliland protectorate and formed a government for the self-declared state.

Although there were hopes amongst of Northern communities for succession as early as 1961, the SNM did not have a clear policy on this matter from the onset. However, any nationalistic objectives amongst SNM members and supporters was abruptly altered in light of the genocide experienced under the Barre regime. As a result, strengthening the case for succession and reclamation of independence to the territory of State of Somaliland. Garaad Cabdiqani Garaad Jama who led the Dhulbahante delegation was first to table the case for succession.

As a result, in May 1991 an SNM Central Committee convened in Burco collectively agreed upon revoking its voluntary union with the Somali Democratic Republic. Representatives from the Isaaq clan were in collective support of secession which was reinforced by the support the clan elders of the non-Isaaq clans who were present at the Burco conference

The conference was concluded with formation of an interim administration whereby Abdirahman Ahmed Ali Tuur was elected to govern for a period of two years.

== Borama 1993 (Grand Conference of National Reconciliation) ==
In 24 January 1993 to 28 May 1993 the "Borama Conference" took place to elect a new president and Vice President. The conference was attended by 150 elders from the Isaaq (88), Gadabursi (21), Dhulbahante (21), Warsengali (11) and Issa (9) communities and was endorsed by the SNM. As a result, the conference granted the government of Somaliland local legitimacy beyond the realms of the Isaaq dominated SNM, especially since the town of Borama was predominantly inhabited by the Gadabursi.

A wide range of topics were debated, whereby delegates agreed on a security framework and a national constitutional structure. Therefore, leading to the formation of a bicameral parliament was to be formed consisting of the 150 voting members of the conference which were then split into an upper and lower house a system embodied in the national charter.

This was a critical turning point whereby a peace charter was created to bolster security and formalise the authority of traditional local elders in all aspects of peacemaking.

At this conference, the delegates agreed to establish an executive president and a bicameral legislature whereby Somaliland's second president Muhammad Haji Egal was elected.

== Demobilisation Initiatives 1993 ==
The Somaliland government sought unify SNM armed factions to ensure demobilisation and reintegration of ex-combatants into society.

== Hargeisa Peace Conference 15 October 1996 go 23 February 1997 ==
The 1997 peace conference that took place in Hargeisa was the last of a long series of reconciliation conferences that led to the establishment of the current administrative system in Somaliland.
