= Sheikh San'ani Brigade =

Military unit of the Somali National Movement

Sheikh San'ani Brigade Guutada Sheekh Sancaani فرقة الشيخ صنعاني
- Active: 1988–1991
- Country: Somali Republic
- Allegiance: Somali National Movement
- Branch: Infantry
- Part of: Army
- Engagements: Somaliland War of Independence

Commanders
- Notable commanders: Sultan Mohamed Sultan Farah

The Sheikh San'ani Brigade (Somali: Guutada Sheekh Sancaani, Arabic: فرقة الشيخ صنعاني) was a highly trained Somali National Movement infantry which had a leading role in the Somaliland War of Independence.

== Legacy ==
The Brigade under the leadership of Sultan Mohamed Sultan Farah led Somaliland's demobilization and disarmament process. In February 1994, the SNM unit was first to hand over its weapons to the government and become absorbed into the Somaliland Armed Forces.
