= Baligubadle =

Town in Hawd region, Somaliland

Baligubadle Baligubadle
- Town
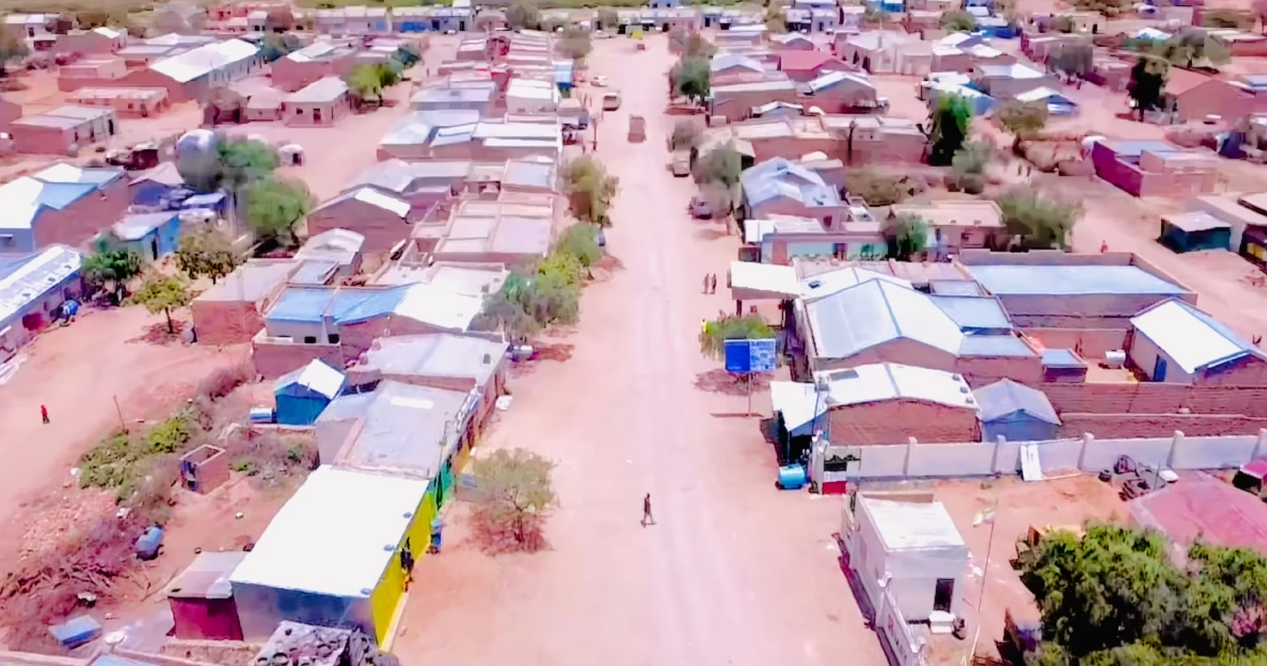

- Local council seal of Baligubadle

- Location within Marodi Jeh Location within Somaliland
- Coordinates: 9°0′0″N 44°0′1″E
- Country: Somaliland
- Region: Maroodi Jeex
- District: Baligubadle

Government
  - Mayor: Shiine Abdi Hayaan

Population (2023)
  - Total: 18,000
- Time zone: UTC+3 (EAT)

Baligubadle is a town in the southern Maroodi Jeex region of Somaliland. The locality serves as the capital of the Baligubadle District, an administrative subdivision of the Maroodi Jeex region that was created in 1991 after regaining Somaliland independence, and straddles the border with the Somali Region of Ethiopia.

== History ==
The town of Baligubadle served as the administrative headquarters of the SNM and played a crucial role in the formation of modern-day Somaliland.

In March 1990, Baligubadle hosted the sixth Somali National Movement congress whereby the role of the House of Elders (Somaliland) was formally institutionalized under Article 4 of the Somali National Movement constitution.

Additionally, the constitution of the Somali National Movement was adopted at the organisation's sixth congress in the town in 1990. Therefore, paving way for the future administration to govern for two years.

== Demographics ==
The town's inhabitants are mostly pastoralist whereby the local economy is predominantly dependent on livestock trade, however small-scale rain fed farming is also practiced. The town has approximately 18,000 inhabitants.

== Governance ==
A local council is made up of 9 elected officials are responsible for the provision of water, education, health, electricity, and sanitation in the town. Councillors were first elected in 2001 and subsequently in 2012 and 2021, continued decentralised processes has empowered the local council in effectively serving its populations needs.

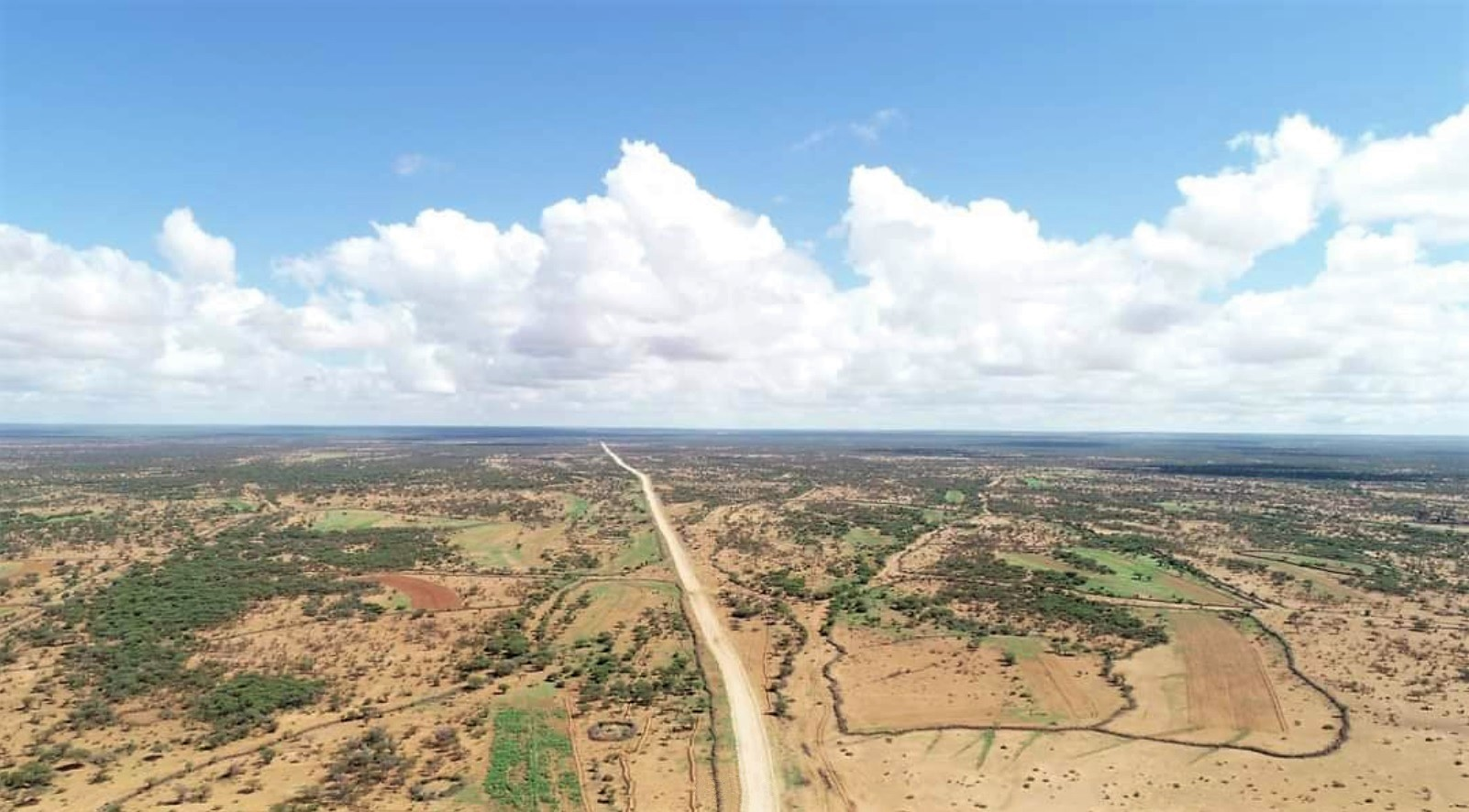
The road from the capital Hargeisa to Baligubadle through the Hawd plain

== Education ==
The Farah Nour secondary school, named after the famous poet and warrior Farah Nur who hailed from the area, serves the local population and as a public school, is supported by the Ministry of Education and Science of Somaliland.

== See also ==
- Administrative divisions of Somaliland
- Regions of Somaliland
- Districts of Somaliland
