= 2024 Somaliland national political party election =

National Party elections happening in Somaliland in 2024

Results by region

Results by district

Elections were held in Somaliland on November 13, 2024 concurrently with the 2024 Somaliland presidential election to select the three official national political parties of the country for a period of ten years. The three currently existing political parties along with seven newly formed political associations contested the election.

== Background ==
The Constitution of Somaliland stipulates that only three political parties can exist at any one time. As a result, elections are held every ten years to determine the country's legal national political parties from a pool consisting of the existing political parties and newly formed political associations. In 2002 and 2012, local municipal elections were used to select national political parties, with the three highest performing political parties or associations becoming the country's official national parties.

== Contesting parties ==
Party/Political association	English name	Somali name	Logo	Details	Leadership	Acronym
Kulmiye	The Kulmiye Peace, Unity and Development Party	Xisbiga Kulmiye Nabad, Midnimo iyo Horumarka		Kulmiye Peace, Unity and Development Party, also known as simply Kulmiye (lit. 'Solidarity') has been the ruling party in Somaliland since 2010. Kulmiye has been a national party since 2002.	Mohamed Kahin Ahmed; Somali: Maxamed Kaahin Axmed	
Waddani	The Somaliland National Party	Xisbiga Waddani		The Somaliland National Party, sometimes referred to as the Waddani National Party and better known by its shortened Somali form Waddani (lit. 'Patriotic Party') is currently the main opposition party in Somaliland. Waddani has been a national party since 2012.	Hersi Ali Haji Hassan; Somali: Xirsi Cali Xaaji Xasan	
UCID	The Justice and Welfare Party	Ururka Caddaalada iyo Daryeelka		The Justice and Welfare Party, also known as For Justice and Development and often referred to simply by its Somali acronym UCID, is the oldest political party in Somaliland. UCID has been a national party since 2002	Faysal Ali Warabe; Somali: Faysal Cali Waraabe	UCID
Barwaaqo	The Barwaaqo Political Party	Ururka Barwaaqo		The Barwaaqo Political Party, (lit. 'Prosperity Party') is a Political Association founded by Dr. Mohamed "Gaboose". A physician and former Minister of Interior in the Government of President Silanyo.	Dr. Mohamed Abdi Yusuf Gaboose Somali: Dr. Maxamed Cabdi Yuusuf Gaboose	
Rejo	The Rejo-Somaliland Conservative Party	Urur Siyaasadeedka Rejo			Dr. Abdillahi Dahab; Somali: Dr. Cabdillaahi Dahab	
Horseed	The Horseed Political Association	Ururka Horseed		Horseed, (lit. 'To Lead') is a Political Association founded by Abdillahi "Darawal". A former senior SNM commander during the Somaliland War of Independence, as well as a cabinet minister in the Government of President Egal.	Abdillahi Hussein Iman "Darawal"; Somali: Cabdillaahi Xuseen Iimaan "Darawal"	SDDP
Talo-Wadaag	Equal Justice Under the Law	Urur Siyaasadeedka Talo-Wadaag			Ibrahim Mahdi Buuba; Somali: Ibraahim Mahdi Buubaa	
Kaah	The Kaah Alliance for Equality and Development in Somaliland	Isbahaysiga Sinnaanta iyo Horumarka Somaliland Kaah		Kaah, is a Political Association founded by Mohamoud Hashi. A former cabinet minister in the Government of President Silanyo, Hashi was a long time member of the ruling Kulmiye party before leaving the party after a failed bid to take over the Chairmanship of the party from President Bihi in 2020.	Mohamoud Hashi Abdi; Somali: Maxamuud Xaashi Cabdi	
Hillaac	The Hillaac Political Association	Urur Siyaasadeedka Hillaac		Hillaac, (lit. 'Lightning') is a political Association founded by Prof. Ahmed Ismail Samatar. An academic and writer who joined the ruling party Kulmiye in 2016, before becoming disgruntled over the parties direction and eventually starting his own Association.	Ahmed Ismail Samatar; Somali: Axmed Ismaaciil Samatar	
Shacabka	The Somaliland Peoples Party	Ururka Shacabka Somaliland			Mohammed Mahmoud Hashi; Somali: Maxamed Maxamuud Xaashi	SPP

== Results ==
Party	Votes	%	+/–
Waddani	216,284	33.80	✓
Kaah	131,507	20.55	✓
Kulmiye	108,100	16.90	✓
Horseed	87,218	13.63	✗
Hillaac	59,569	9.31	✗
Barwaaqo	16,852	2.63	✗
For Justice and Development	10,105	1.58	✗
Talo-Wadaag	6,080	0.95	✗
Rejo	2,083	0.33	✗
Shacabka	2,014	0.31	✗
Total	639,812	100.00	–
Valid votes	639,812	97.56	
Invalid/blank votes	16,032	2.44	
Total votes	655,844	100.00	
Registered voters/turnout	1,227,048	53.45	
Source: "SLNEC Interim Results".
