= 2027 Somaliland municipal elections =

Local elections in Somaliland

- by March 2027
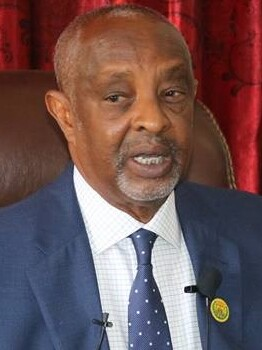

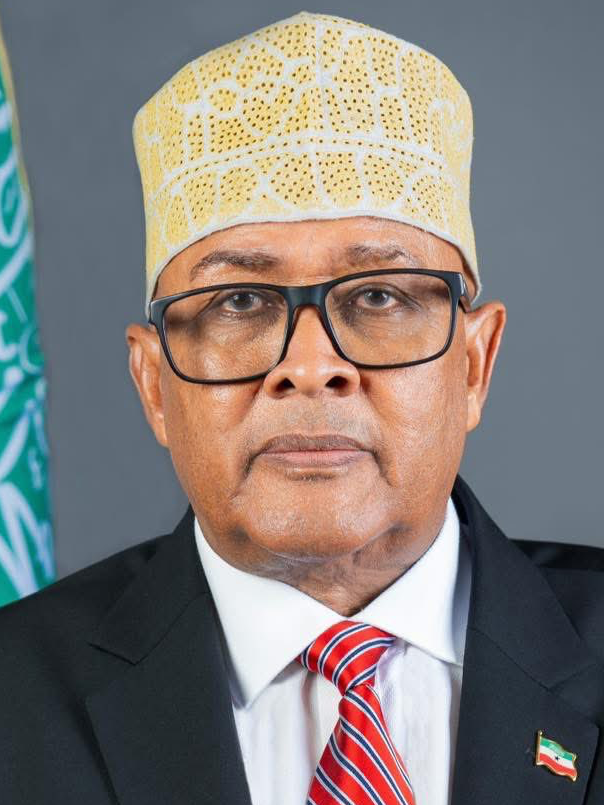

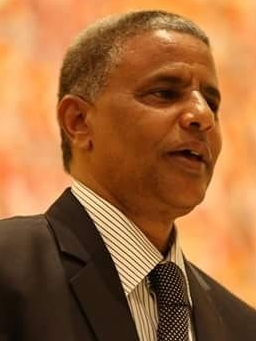
	First party	Second party	Third party
Leader	Mohamed Kahin Ahmed	Abdirahman Mohamed Irro	Mohamoud Hashi Abdi
Party	Kulmiye	Waddani	Kaah
Last election	93 seats 38.99%	79 seats 37.83%	Didn't exist
- Results per district. Kulmiye Waddani Kaah

Mayoral and local district council elections are scheduled to occur in Somaliland in March 2027 alongside parliamentary elections, having been postponed from May 2026. The elections will be contested by the three official national political parties of Somaliland, Kulmiye, Waddani and the newest party Kaah. Elections have great significance as they will be determining the leaders of Somaliland at the district and city levels. The responsibility of local councils is to ensure the provision of basic services to the citizens like health, infrastructure, and security. These elections may affect the balance of power between political parties as well as their governance policies in the future.

Elections in 2027 will follow previous delays in the electoral process, making them important for strengthening democracy and public trust. Many citizens are expecting improvements in transparency, better service delivery, and accountability from new elected leaders. The elections follow the previous municipal elections held in 2021 and are part of Somaliland’s system of local governance.

== Background ==
Somaliland has held several elections since adopting a multiparty system in 2002. Of note, the 2021 parliamentary and local council elections in Somaliland were conducted in tandem and marked a crucial point in the country's democratization process. Indeed as per 2021 policy brief by ISIR the 2021 elections involved over one million registered voters. were seen as a major step in Somaliland’s democratic development. Furthermore, although there had been delays in conducting elections, some political institutions had extended their terms beyond the legal limit. The 2021 elections revealed significant challenges, particularly the underrepresentation of women.

== Electoral System ==
In Somaliland, the election system is proportional representation with an open party list. This means that voters choose individual candidates from political parties rather than just voting for the party itself. The country has six electoral regions and 23 districts, as defined by the Regions and Districts Law (Law No, 2002). Each region elects representatives based on the number of seats that exist. Districts are classified into four categories, A, B, C, and D, based on population, size, and economic activity. The total number of members of the district councils of the local government shall be based on their grading as follow A districts have 21 council members B districts have 17 members C districts have 13 members D districts have 9 members The capital, Hargeisa, has a council of 25 members Local council elections involve candidates competing against one another within specific regions and towns. Only three officially registered political parties are allowed to contest elections at a time.The political parties put forward their candidates for local council elections.

According to Somaliland Republic law, it is the duty of the district councils to provide basic public utilities like education, health care facilities, and infrastructure. The district councils help in the implementation of policies of the government at the local level (Somaliland Law, 2002). Moreover, as per the law, decentralization is encouraged, which means that local administrations are empowered in managing their affairs but under the supervision of the central government. Results will be announced after the elections. Outcomes will include district-level performance of each political party and the selection of mayors.
