= Abdillahi Ismail Ali =

Somaliland politician, former Minister of Interior

Abdillahi Ismail Irro
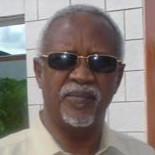

Minister of Interior of Somaliland
- In office August 2006 – July 2010
- President: Dahir Riyale Kahin
- Preceded by: Ismail Adan Osman
- Succeeded by: Mohamed Abdi Gaboose

Personal details
- Occupation: Politician

Abdillahi Ismail Ali (Somali: Cabdilaahi Ismaaciil Cali), also known as Irro (Cirro), is a Somaliland politician who served as the country's Minister of Interior from 2006 to 2010 under President Dahir Riyale Kahin. He has remained an active political figure and has continued to appear at public events, including those of the Waddani Party.

The current President of Somaliland, Abdirahman Mohamed Abdullahi (Irro) is a different person.

== Biography ==
Abdillahi Ismail Irro was once arrested while Mohamed Abdi Gaboose was serving as Minister of Interior under President Egal.

=== Interior Minister ===
In August 2006, President Dahir Riyale Kahin carried out a cabinet reshuffle and appointed Abdillahi Ismail Irro as Minister of Interior.

In July 2007, Somaliland police arrested the leader of the Qaran party and a former interior minister, Mohamed Abdi Gaboose, and the first deputy, Mohamed Hashi Elmi. Later, Interior Minister Abdillahi Ismail Irro said they had begun election campaigning before the three legally registered parties, thereby threatening public order.

In 2008, President Dahir Riyale Kahin announced the creation of new regions separated from the existing administrative regions. The area around Zeila was designated as part of the new Saraar Region, and the ceremony marking this change was attended by President Kahin, Interior Minister Abdillahi Ismail Irro, and other officials.

In October 2008, three suicide bombings occurred in Hargeisa, the capital of Somaliland. In response, Interior Minister Abdillahi Ismail Irro urged Somalilanders not to associate refugees from Somalia with the attackers or to subject them to violence or other hostile acts.

In March 2009, Suhuura Airways opened a new office at Hargeisa International Airport, and Interior Minister Abdillahi Ismail Irro attended the inauguration ceremony.

In August 2009, the Somaliland National Electoral Commission announced that the voter registration process for the upcoming presidential election was flawed and decided to nullify the registration. In response, opposition parties declared plans for a demonstration, but Interior Minister Abdillahi Ismail Irro warned that the protest would be illegal and a threat to public order, expressing his full support for the commission's decision.

In January 2010, Interior Minister Abdillahi Ismail Irro led a government delegation on an official visit to Djibouti, during which he conducted diplomatic engagements to strengthen relations between the two countries.

In March 2010, a delegation of Somaliland government and parliamentary officials visited Addis Ababa, Ethiopia, and Abdillahi Ismail Irro was among the members of the delegation.

In July 2010, following the presidential elections, Somaliland's presidency passed from Dahir Riyale Kahin to Ahmed Mohamed Mohamoud Silanyo. Silanyo then appointed Mohamed Abdi Gaboose, who had previously been detained while Abdillahi Ismail Irro was serving as interior minister, as the new Minister of Interior. However, during the handover ceremony the two men shared jokes about each other's history of arrests, creating a cordial and light-hearted atmosphere.

In February 2013, the Somaliland government awarded certificates of honour to 100 individuals for their contributions to national development, and Abdillahi Ismail Irro was selected as one of the two recipients recognized in the “Security-Intelligence” sector.

=== Waddani Party ===
In July 2017, Abdillahi Ismail Irro joined the Waddani party together with Ahmed Jambir Suldan and other politicians from the same clan.

In July 2024, Waddani Party presidential candidate Abdirahman Mohamed Abdullahi Irro held a ceremony to welcome a group of intellectuals and youth who had newly declared their support for the party, and Abdillahi Ismail Irro attended the event as one of the party's senior figures.
