= List of political parties in Somaliland =

Somaliland has a multi-party system, with a constitutional limit of three official parties at the national level (determined for a 10-year period at the beginning of each decade based on municipal election results, in which more parties are allowed) as an attempt to avoid political tribalism. A single party often does not have win power alone, so the parties must instead form coalition governments. However, despite some parties having affiliations with political internationals of a particular ideology, politics in Somaliland tend to be more clan-based rather than ideology-based. As such, the programs of parties can fluctuate depending on the issues surrounding the clan(s) that support them.

== Current parties ==
Party	Abbr.	Est.	Leader	Political position	Ideology	Seats
Somaliland National Party; Somali: Xisbiga Waddani; Arabic: واداني	Waddani	2012	Hersi Ali Haji Hassan	Syncretic	Nationalism; Populism; Islamic democracy	31 / 82
Kulmiye Peace, Unity, and Development Party; Somali: Xisbiga Kulmiye Nabad, Midnimo iyo Horumarka; Arabic: حزب التضامن	Kulmiye	2002	Mohamed Kahin Ahmed	Centre to centre-left	Social liberalism Islamic democracy	30 / 82
Kaah Alliance for Equality and Development; Somali: Isbahaysiga Sinnaanta iyo Horumarka Kaah; Arabic: تحالف كاه للمساواة والتنمية	Kaah	2022	Mohamoud Hashi Abdi			0 / 82

== Former parties ==
Dissolved parties of Somaliland
Party	Native name	Political position	Ideology	Seats
(UDUB); United Peoples' Democratic Party	Ururka Dimuqraadiga Ummadda Bahawday	Centre to Centre-left	Nationalism; Islamic democracy	0 / 82 (dissolved in 2011)
(UCID); Justice and Welfare Party	Ururka Caddaalada iyo Daryeelka	Centre-left	Democratic socialism Social democracy	0 / 82 (dissolved in 2024)

== See also ==
- Politics of Somaliland
