= Kaah =

Kaah may refer to:

- Kaah Alliance for Equality and Development, a political party in Somaliland
- Kaah Political Association, a political party in Puntland
- KAAH-TV, a television station in Hawaii
