= Ismail Adan Osman =

Somaliland politician and former Minister of Interior

- Ismaaciil Aadan Cismaan
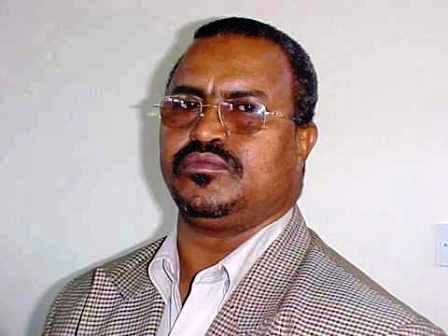

Minister of Interior of Somaliland
- In office November 2002 – 2006
- President: Dahir Riyale Kahin
- Preceded by: Abdillahi Omar Ige
- Succeeded by: Abdillahi Ismail Ali

Personal details
- Occupation: Politician
- Nickname: Ismail Yare

Ismail Adan Osman (Somali: Ismaaciil Aadan Cismaan), commonly known as Ismail Yare, is a Somaliland politician who served as the country's Minister of Interior from 2002 to 2006 under President Dahir Riyale Kahin.

== Biography ==
Yare is from Reer Haawade sub-clan of Sa'ad Musa sub-clan of the Habar Awal of the Isaaq.

=== Commerce Minister ===
In May 1999, President Egal dismissed Yare from his post as Minister of Commerce in a major cabinet reshuffle. He acquired the nickname "Yare" after attaining ministerial roles at a relatively young age, having assumed his first ministerial position while under the age of 40.

=== Interior Minister ===
In November 2002, President Dahir Riyale Kahin appointed Yare as Minister of the Interior to succeed Abdillahi Omar Ige. Yare and Ige were both from Hargeisa and belonged to closely related clans.

In December 2002, individuals dissatisfied with the placement of Lughaya-managed ballot boxes in Daara-Salaam, an area administratively belonging to Hargeisa, seized the ballot boxes. As Minister of Interior, Yare arrested the perpetrators and handed the ballot boxes over to the Electoral Commission. At a press conference, he explained that the placement of the ballot boxes was merely a technical matter for the Electoral Commission and did not imply a change in administrative boundaries.

In February 2003, following the election of the mayor by the Hargeisa City Council, Yale said, "While only God can truly bring about the equality and justice to which you have declared your commitment, you must work toward that goal."

In April 2005, the Somaliland police searched the headquarters of the opposition Kulmiye party without a search warrant, suspecting that an illegal radio station was located there. However, no such radio station was found. Yare, serving as Minister of the Interior, insisted that a search warrant was not necessary when searching an illegal radio station.

In April 2006, following an incident in which 60 prisoners escaped from a prison in Somaliland and were later recaptured, Yale held a press conference and repeatedly emphasized that all of them had been recaptured, denying rumors that some had managed to escape.

He later said that, during his time as Minister of the Interior, he would answer phone calls even at 2 a.m.

In August 2006, President Kahin carried out a cabinet reshuffle and appointed Abdillahi Ismail Irro as Minister of Interior.

=== UDUB Central Committee ===
Even after being dismissed as minister, Yale remained a member of the UDUB Party and served on its Central Committee.

In December 2008, he toured voter registration offices and urged residents of Hargeisa and Burao to register to vote in order to demonstrate the party's population base and voter count.

=== Dalsan Party ===
He remained a loyal member of the UDUB between 1997 and 2010, before embarking on establishing a Party in 2011.

In April 2011, a committee was established to oversee the registration of political parties in Somaliland. However, because one of the members dispatched by UDUB adopted an uncooperative attitude, the committee expelled that member. As a result, UDUB withdrew its remaining members from the committee, and this incident became the reason why UDUB's dissolution became inevitable.

In September 2011, Yale announced that he had established a new political organization called Dalsan and assumed the position of chairman. Regarding the symbols on the Dalsan flag, he explained that white represents peace, green represents development and prosperity, and the star represents the former "Five Somalias".

=== Kulmiye Party ===
Only three official political parties are recognized in Somaliland, and members of the National Assembly must belong to one of them. In November 2012, the first elections for the three registered political parties were held. These parties competed in the local elections. Two established parties and five new parties vied for seats, with Kulmiye, Waddani, and UCID winning seats, while Dalsan came in last. In February 2013, the Dalsan political association, including its chairman Yare, officially merged into the ruling Kulmiye party.

In December 2014, a clan meeting was held at a hotel in Hargeisa. During the meeting, the clan chief expressed support for a specific politician in the presidential election, so Yale admonished him, saying that a clan chief should not make such statements.

=== Waddani Party ===
In July 2017, numerous influential politicians joined the Waddani party, among them Yare. He explained that although he had attempted to merge the Dalsan party, which he led, with Kulmiye, the party leader had rejected the proposal, and that he himself was not a member of Kulmiye. He then stated that he had decided to join the rapidly growing Waddani party.

In August 2017, Yale was appointed to the Waddani Party's Committee on Internal Affairs and National Defense by the party's presidential candidate, Abdirahman Mohamed Abdullahi (Irro). At that time, a total of 121 people were appointed to various committees.

In November 2024, during the campaign period leading up to the presidential and parliamentary elections, Yale was fined by Somaliland's Electoral Ethics, Conflict Resolution, and Monitoring Committee for violating the election code of conduct.

In early December 2024, Abdirahman Mohamed Abdullahi, the presidential candidate of the Waddani Party, was elected president. In late December 2024, President Irro appointed Yale as Presidential National Security Advisor.

== See also ==
- Politics of Somaliland
- Cabinet of Somaliland
- Dahir Riyale Kahin
