= 2002 Somaliland municipal elections =

Local elections in Somaliland

2002 Somaliland municipal election
- 15 December 2002
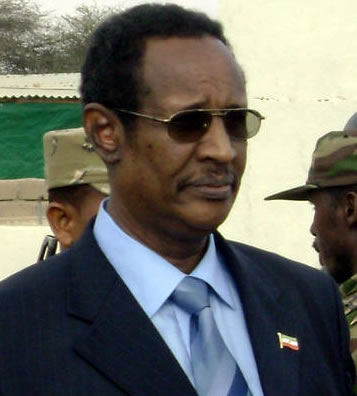

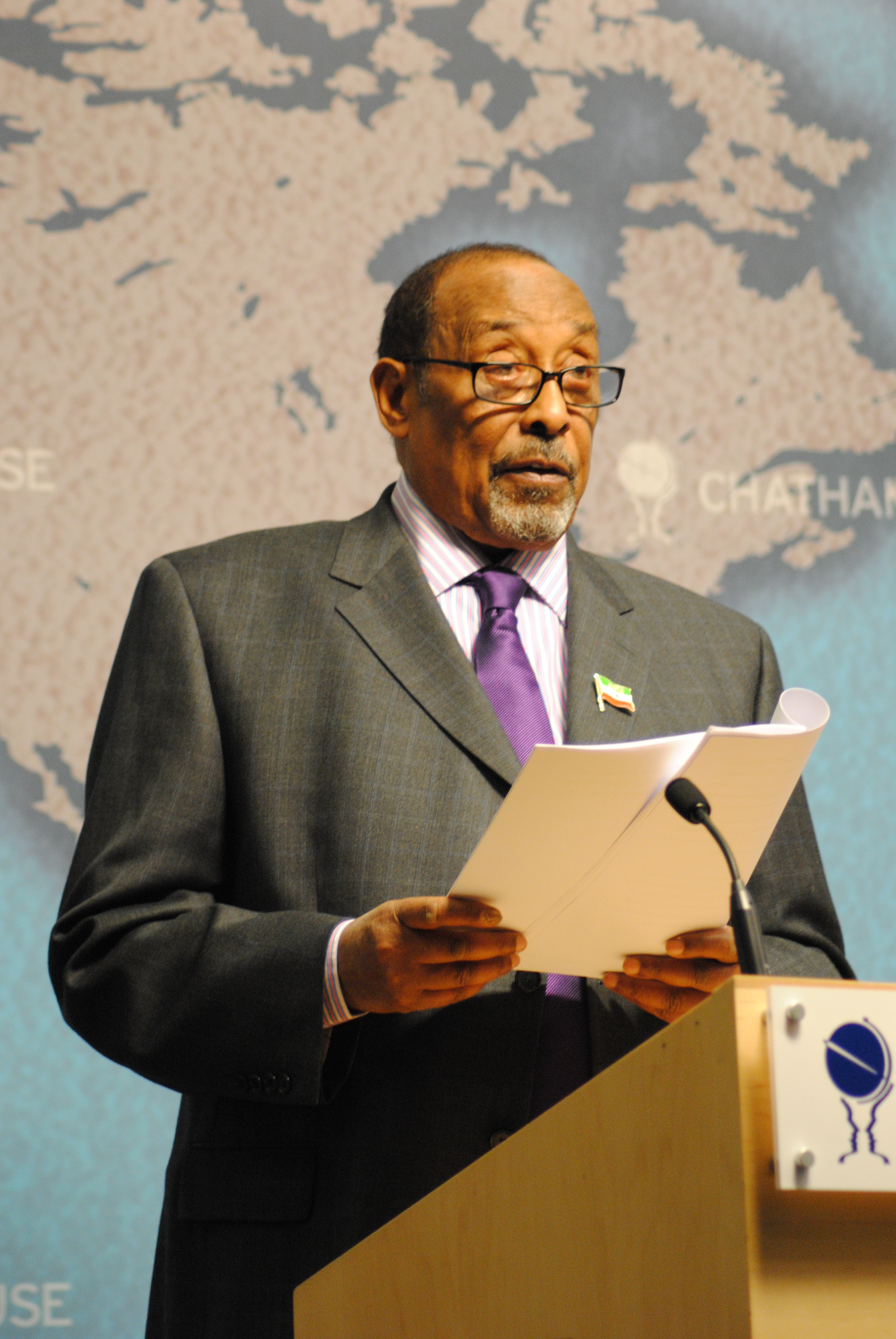

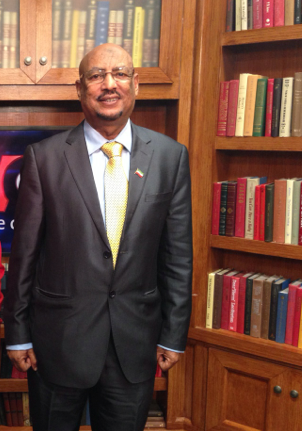
Nominee	Dahir Riyale Kahin	Ahmed Mohamed Mohamoud	Faysal Ali Warabe
Party	UDUB	Kulmiye	For Justice and Development
Running mate	Ahmed Yusuf Yasin	Abdirahman Saylici	Mohammad Rashid
Popular vote	179,389	83,158	49,444
Percentage	40.76%	18.90%	11.24%
Party	Sahan	Hormood	Asad
Popular vote	47,942	40,538	39,596
Percentage	10.89%	9.21%	9.00%

Municipal elections were held across Somaliland on 15 December 2002. Six political associations fielded 2368 candidates for local council seats. There were 379 council seats nationally although 47 seats were not contested. Voting was postponed in Las Anod and Taleex due to local security conditions and at 16 polling stations in Buhoodle District. In Hudun, Badhan and Dhahar, only one candidate ist was submitted, so no elections took place, while in Laskorey no political association sumitted a candidate list. electoral districts.

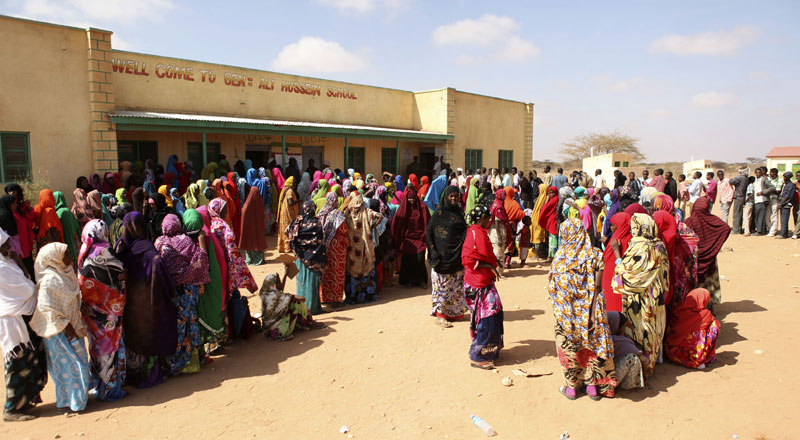
Long queues of voters in the Somaliland municipal elections

Prior to these elections, local government only consisted of a mayor and a councillor both appointed by the Ministry of Interior by the recommendation of the President. These elections would pave way for the establishment of popularly-elected local governments that were directly responsible to local constituencies.

== Political associations ==
The Constitution of Somaliland stipulated that only three political parties could exist at any one time. As a result, the three associations that gained the largest numbers of local council seats would become the official political parties and enjoyed exclusive legitimacy for the next ten years. A political organisation had to achieve 20% of the vote in at least four of Somaliland's six regions in order to become a national party and contest presidential and parliamentary elections.

The contenders that took part in this process included:

- United Peoples' Democratic Party (UDUB) led by President Dahir Riyale Kahin
- Peace, Unity, and Development Party (Kulmiye) headed by Ahmed Mohamed Mohamoud
- For Justice and Development (UCID) led by Faysal Ali Warabe
- Sahan led by Dr Mohamed Abdi Gaboose
- Asad led by Suleiman Mohamoud Adan
- Hormood led by Umar Ghalib

== Results ==
Over 440,000 people took part in the country's first municipal elections. Results were announced a week later by the National Electoral Commission, with UDUB, Kulmiye and UCID finishing as the top three parties.

Party	Votes	%
United Peoples' Democratic Party	179,389	40.76
Kulmiye	83,158	18.90
UCID	49,444	11.24
Sahan	47,942	10.89
Hormood	40,538	9.21
ASAD	39,596	9.00
Total	440,067	100.00
Source: African Elections Database

The elections also determined which three political organizations would be recognized as national political parties. UDUB, Kulmiye and UCID received the three highest national vote totals and became eligible to contest subsequent presidential and parliamentary elections. The 118 councillors elected on the lists of Sahan, Hormood and ASAD, which did not qualify as national parties, were required to join one of the three recognized parties.

=== by Regions ===
Voting Results in 2002 Local Government Elections
Region	UDUB		Kulmiye		UCID		SAHAN		HORMOD		ASAD		Total Votes
	Votes	%	Votes	%	Votes	%	Votes	%	Votes	%	Votes	%	
Hargeisa	70,989	38.09%	29,923	16.05%	30,676	16.46%	14,748	7.91%	29,104	15.62%	10,943	5.87%	186,383
Awdal	58,939	58.65%	13,679	13.61%	7,422	7.39%	4,499	4.48%	7,229	7.19%	8,727	8.68%	100,495
Togdheer	18,330	27.52%	17,476	26.24%	4,821	7.24%	15,234	22.87%	1,454	2.18%	9,283	13.94%	66,598
Sanaag	16,574	31.22%	13,701	25.80%	3,401	6.41%	11,356	21.39%	1,409	2.65%	6,655	12.53%	53,096
Sahil	13,502	49.58%	5,309	19.49%	2,900	10.65%	2,054	7.54%	1,188	4.36%	2,281	8.38%	27,234
Sool	1,173	18.99%	1,223	19.80%	692	11.21%	1,303	21.10%	232	3.76%	1,553	25.15%	6,176
Total	179,507	41.20%	81,311	18.20%	49,912	11.20%	49,194	11.10%	40,616	9.10%	39,442	8.90%	439,982
Source: African Elections Database

== Aftermath ==
The elections were viewed largely as a success and was an essential step in the transition from a clan-based formed of governance to a democracy.

Political associations that ranked fourth or lower ceased to exist. Although Sahan passed the threshold of receiving 20% of the votes in at least four regions and UCID did not, it was decided that UCID's higher national vote share qualified it to become the third party, a controversial decision.

Councillors from the associations that were dissolved were subsequently required to join one of the newly appointed national parties, UDUB, Kulmiye or UCID.
