= Ministry of Presidency =

Government ministry of Somaliland

Republic of Somaliland Ministry of Presidency
- Wasaaradda Madaxtooyada JSL (MoP)
- Coat of arms of Somaliland

Ministry overview
- Formed: 1995; 31 years ago, December 24, 2024; 19 months ago
- Dissolved: December 14, 2017; 8 years ago (Reformed in 2024)
- Jurisdiction: Somaliland
- Headquarters: Maroodi Jeex, Hargeisa (Somaliland)
- Minister responsible: Khadar Hussein Abdi, Minister (government) Current Minister

The Ministry of Presidency of the Republic of Somaliland (MoP) (Somali: Wasaaradda Madaxtooyada Somaliland) (Arabic: وزارة الرئاسة) is a Somaliland government ministry which is concerned about the presidential affairs. Khadar Hussein Abdi is the current Minister.

Although there was a period when it had been discontinued, it was revived in 2011. This ministry was abolished again in December 2017. This ministry was re-established in December 2024.

== Ministers of Presidency ==
Image	Minister	Period Start	Period End
	Yusuf Mohamed Ali	1991	
	Deeqa Jama Jibril	1993	1994
	Nour Ahmed Osman	July 2003	July 2009
	Hassan Ahmed Duale (Also State Minister for Interior)	July 2009	
	(abolished)		July 2011
	Hersi Ali Haji Hassan	July 2011	October 2015
	Mohamoud Hashi Abdi	October 2015	December 2017
	(abolished)	December 2017	December 2024
	Khadar Hussein Abdi	December 2024	Present

== See also ==
- Politics of Somaliland
- Ministry of Civil Aviation (Somaliland)
- Ministry of Parliamentary Relations
