= Abdalle Mohamed Arab =

Somaliland politician, current Minister of Interior

- Cabdalle Maxamed Carab
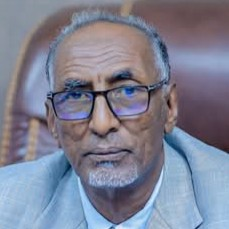

Minister of Interior of Somaliland
- Incumbent
- Assumed office 12 December 2024
- President: Abdirahman Mohamed Abdullahi (Irro)
- Preceded by: Mohamed Kahin Ahmed

Mayor of Berbera
- In office February 2003 – December 2012
- Preceded by: Hassan Haji Mahamud Warsame (Hassan Gadhweyne)
- Succeeded by: Abdishakur Iddin

Personal details
- Occupation: Politician
- Nickname: Cabdale Sandheere

Abdalle Mohamed Arab (Somali: Cabdalle Maxamed Carab), commonly known as Sandheere, is a Somaliland politician who has served as the country's Minister of Interior since December 2024. He previously served as the Mayor of Berbera from 2003 to 2012.

== Career ==
=== Berbera Mayor ===
In Februally 2003, Abdalle Mohamed Arab became the first mayor of Berbera, elected by the Berbera Council council elected by the residents for the first time in 36 years.

At the time, there was a dispute over whether the newly initiated cement factory should accept investment from a German investor or remain government property, and he struggled to mediate between the opposing sides.

In March 2005, the mayor of Berbera appealed to the United Nations for emergency assistance to control locust swarms that had reportedly reached as far as eastern Berbera in Somaliland.

In 2009, while serving as mayor of Berbera, Abdalle Mohamed Arab stated that the poet Elmi Boodhari’s separation from the girl to whom he had dedicated his love poems was not caused by their age difference, but rather by the fact that open declarations of love from a man to a woman were unacceptable in the old cultural norms of the time. He added that the elders of that period should have played a role in bringing the two together.

In September 2010, Abdalle Mohamed Arab stated that he did not regard Ali Hoor Hoor, who had stepped down as manager of the port of Berbera, as an excellent administrator, but as one of the fighters who had led Somaliland to independence.

In February 2011, Abdalle Mohamed Arab reported that the municipality was carrying out an operation to remove illegally constructed roadside shops in order to improve the town's appearance, and stated that the demolitions were not imposed by force but were implemented after sufficient consultation with local residents.

In December 2012, Abdalle Mohamed Arab handed over the position of Mayor of Berbera to Abdishakur Iddin. Later, Abdalle Mohamed Arab stated that, although he had enjoyed strong support among Kulmiye candidates before the election, he stepped back from running again because of disagreements with the central government.

=== Waddani party ===
In September 2017, Abdalle Mohamed Arab formally joined the opposition Waddani party at a large ceremony held in Berbera.

=== Interior Minister ===
On December 12, 2024, Abdirahman Mohamed Abdullahi (Irro) was inaugurated as President of Somaliland, and on the 14th, some cabinet appointments were announced. Abdalle Mohamed Arab was appointed Minister of the Interior.

At the end of December 2024, heavy fighting broke out in the Ethiopian village of Dawacaley, located very close to Somaliland, between the Ogaden-dominated Liyu Police and residents predominantly from the Isaaq clan, resulting in dozens of fatalities. In response, Somaliland's Minister of Interior, Abdalle Mohamed Arab, announced that he had contacted the relevant Ethiopian authorities, expressed deep condolences for the victims in the area, and urged the Ethiopian government to de-escalate the situation.

In April 2025, Abdalle Mohamed Arab stated that the government is working to eradicate clanism and aims to end deep-rooted tribal conflicts within a year. He further emphasized that he is not even permitted to reveal their own clan affiliation.

In May 2025, following plans for a protest in Burao against rumours that prisoners captured during the Las Anod conflict would be released under a Somaliland re-independence amnesty, Interior Minister Abdalle Mohamed Arab rejected the speculation and stated that the authorities would take action against those spreading such unfounded claims.
