= Mohamed Nour Arrale =

Somali politician

Mohamed Nour Arale محمد نور عرالي

Minister of Interior
- In office 27 July 2010 – 25 June 2013
- President: Ahmed Mohamed Mohamoud
- Preceded by: Farhan Jama Ismail
- Succeeded by: Ali Mohamed Warancadde

Personal details
- Party: Peace, Unity, and Development Party

Mohamed Nour Arale (Somali: Maxamed Nuur Carrale) is a Somali politician. He previously served as the Minister of Interior of Somaliland from 2010 until 2013.

== See also ==
- Ministry of Interior (Somaliland)
- Politics of Somaliland
- Cabinet of Somaliland

Political offices
Preceded by Farhan Jama Ismail	Minister of Interior; 2010-2013	Succeeded by Ali Mohamed Warancadde
