= Baar Said Farah =

Somaliland politician

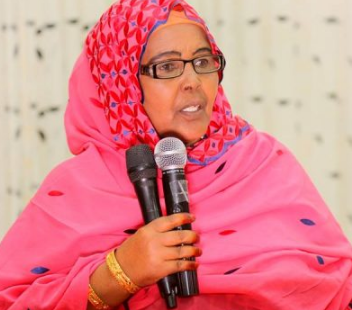

Member of the House of Representatives of Somaliland
- In office 2005–2021

Baar Said Farah (Baar Saed Farah, Somali: Baar Siciid Faarax) is a Somaliland politician who was once the only female member of the Somaliland Parliament.

== Biography ==
Baar Said Farah is from the Warsangali-Dubeys-Reer Mohamed clan. She later became a member of Somaliland parliament representing Dhahar.

=== Member of the Somaliland Parliament ===
In the 2005 Somaliland parliamentary election, a total of 246 candidates ran for office, but only seven were women, and of those, only two were elected. She was one of them, having been selected under the “women's quota” for Sanaag region.

In December 2010, the UDUB party committees were reorganized, and she was selected as one of the five members of the Office of Sub-Committee Liaison and Electoral Commission Affairs.

In January 2013, she strongly criticized a new airport tax regulation proposed by the Ministry of Aviation. She argued the fees were illegal, bypassed the Ministry of Finance's authority, and created an excessive financial burden for travelers.

In April 2013, she questioned the minister of interior and the police commander during a parliamentary session regarding an armed attack on the Hubaal newspaper. She demanded an explanation for the incident, leading security officials to disclose that a police officer was a primary suspect in the ongoing investigation.

In December 2015, she argued that rape was a national disaster in Somaliland requiring an urgent legislative response. During a parliamentary debate, she stressed that the crisis could not be resolved without a dedicated anti-rape law, and condemned the denial of the issue as contradicting Islamic principles.

In a 2016 interview, she stated that unless a quota for women is established for Somaliland's parliament, there will be no female lawmakers in the legislature in the future.

In July 2018, she criticized the failure to implement a legislative quota for women, describing the exclusion as a misfortune for Somaliland's political development. She argued that guaranteed representation was essential for gender equality in governance, emphasizing the difficulties women face in entering parliament without formal structural support.

In June 2019, Baar Said Farah participated in a legislative debate regarding the agenda for the 40th session of the House of Representatives. While several colleagues requested that the Electoral Law be prioritized as the first item, Farah was involved in the discussions surrounding the procedural handling of the bill.

In June 2021, Baar Said Farah praised the successful and peaceful conduct of the combined parliamentary and local council elections in Somaliland. She noted public satisfaction with the results and urged citizens to maintain peace. As a result of this election, the number of female members in the Somaliland Parliament dropped to zero. The next woman to become a member of parliament is Amina Elmi Farid, who was elected to fill a vacancy following the death of her predecessor in May 2023.

=== Presidential advisor ===
In December 2024, President Abdirahman Mohamed Abdullahi appointed Baar Said Farah as the presidential advisor on women's development.
