= Mohamed Abdi Gaboose =

Somaliland politician and former Minister of Interior

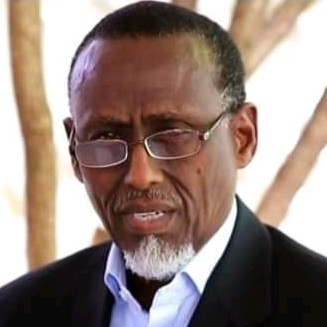
- Gaboose in 2019

Minister of Interior of Somaliland
- In office 1998–1999
- President: Muhammad Haji Ibrahim Egal

Minister of Interior of Somaliland
- In office 28 July 2010 – 18 August 2011
- President: Ahmed Mohamed Mohamoud

Personal details
- Occupation: Politician, neurologist

Mohamed Abdi Gaboose (Somali: Maxamed Cabdi Gaboose) is a Somaliland politician and medical doctor who twice served as the Minister of Interior of Somaliland, first under President Muhammad Haji Ibrahim Egal around 1998 and later under President Ahmed Mohamed Mohamoud (Silanyo) from July 2010 until his resignation in August 2011.

He is a trained neurologist and co-founder of the Haldoor Multi-Specialty Hospital in Hargeisa. Throughout his political career, Gaboose has been an outspoken public figure known for his criticism of government policies and his calls for political reconciliation within Somaliland.

== Biography ==
Gaboose was born in 1956 or 1957. Gaboose hails from the Habar Yoonis sub-clan of the Isaaq clan.

=== Interior Minister (1st term) ===
In 1998, while serving as Minister of Interior under President Muhammad Haji Ibrahim Egal, Mohamed Abdi Gaboose visited Malko-Durduro—reported as one of the sites of the Isaaq genocide—guided by police commander Elmi Roble Furre.

=== After leaving office ===
On 28 July 2007, Gaboose was arrested by President Dahir Riyale Kahin together with Engineer Mohamed Hashi Elmi and Jamal Aideed Ibrahim after they announced the formation of a political organization named Qaran. They were sentenced to three years and nine months in prison and a five-year ban on political activities and were detained at Mandera Prison; Amnesty International criticized the arrests.

=== Interior Minister (2nd term) ===
On 26 June 2010, following President Ahmed Mohamed Mohamoud “Silanyo”’s election victory, Gaboose and two others were appointed as ministers in the new administration.

During his tenure as Minister of Interior, Gaboose rarely appeared in his office, making it difficult for journalists and members of the public to meet or contact him by phone, which led to widespread criticism.

On 18 August 2011, Gaboose held a press conference to announce his resignation, stating that he intended to form a new political organization and contest elections; according to Gaboose, he had submitted his resignation before President Silanyo’s trip to China and it had been accepted. In September 2011, President Silanyo appointed Mohamed Nur Arale (Duur) as Minister of Interior to replace the resigned Gaboose.

=== Umada Party and 2012 Somaliland municipal elections ===
In late 2011, Gaboose established a new political party named UMADDA (Ururka Maaraynta Danta Dalka, Organization for the Management of the National Interest) and became its chairman.

Under the Somaliland Constitution, the number of political parties is limited to three and they are reselected every ten years. On 28 November 2012, a nationwide vote was held; seven political groups—including Umadda—competed, and Kulmiye, Waddani, and UCID were recognized as the three parties, while Umadda failed to qualify. After that, Gaboose retired from political activities.

=== After that ===
In November 2019, Gaboose—who had largely stayed away from day-to-day politics—sharply criticized President Muse Bihi Abdi’s administration as serving only its own group’s interests and warned that, unless corrective action was taken, Somaliland risked further isolation.

In April 2021, approaching the age of seventy and feeling a decline in his abilities, Gaboose announced his retirement as both a politician and a physician, stating that he would hand over the management of his medical enterprise to his children.
