= Deeqa Jama Jibril =

Somali politician

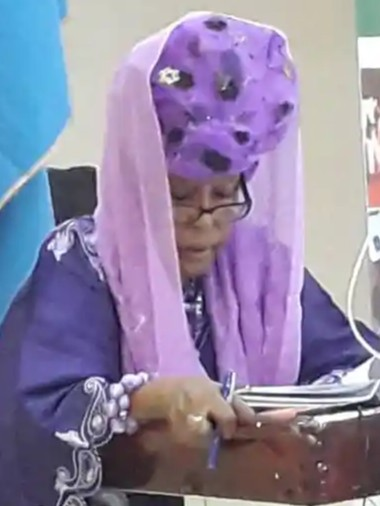

Minister of Presidency
- In office 1993–1994
- President: Muhammad Haji Ibrahim Egal
- Preceded by: Yusuf Mohamed Ali

Deeqa Jama Jibril (Somali: Deeqa Jaamac Jibriil), also known as Deeqa Ol-u-Joog (Somali: Deeqa Col-u-joog), is a Somali politician and was the first female cabinet minister in Somaliland.

== Biography ==
Deeqa comes from Erigavo, Sanaag. She belongs to the Dhulbahante clan.

=== Professor of Somali National University ===
In 1974, Deeqa became a professor of social sciences at the Somali National University and held the position until 1990.

In 1977, Deeqa Ol-u-jog founded the Somali Academy of Science, Arts and Literature and served as its first chair until 1980.

In the early 1980s, Deeqa began writing the work that, thirty-five years later, would be completed and published as Diwaanka Nabadda Soomaaliyeed: Hore, Hadda iyo Hadhow (The Somali Peace Chronicle: Past, Present and Future).

=== Presidency Minister of Somaliland ===
In 1993, after Muhammad Haji Ibrahim Egal was elected president at the Borama Conference, he appointed Deeqa as Minister of the Presidency, making her Somaliland's first female cabinet minister, an appointment that is described as having come in response to pressure from women's groups for greater political participation.

In 1994, Deeqa accompanied President Egal on a visit to Kenya after he was invited by Kenyan President Daniel arap Moi.

Deeqa left her ministerial post after a year and a half, and for a period thereafter only men were appointed to cabinet positions, with the next woman to become a minister in Somaliland being Edna Adan Ismail, who was appointed in August 2002.

=== Somali Peace Conference ===
Between 2002 and 2003, Deeqa was involved in the Somali National Peace and Reconciliation Conference.

In October 2002, Deeqa Col-u-joog departed from Garowe, the capital of Puntland State, to attend the Somali reconciliation conference in Kenya in place of her husband, Interior Minister Ahmed Abdi Mohamed "Habsade".

In January 2004, Deeqa participated in the Somali National Reconciliation Conference consultations held at the Safari Park Hotel outside Nairobi, with part of the costs of her participation covered by pooled donor funds to which the British Government contributed.

=== Assistant Minister of Regional Cooperation of Somalia ===
From 2005 to 2008, Deeqa Ol-u-jog served as Assistant Minister of Regional Cooperation in the Transitional Federal Government of Somalia.

In August 2019, Deeqa presented her book Diwaanka Nabadda Soomaaliyeed: Hore, Hadda iyo Hadhow, a work chronicling thirty-five years of Somali history, at the Peace and Development Research Center (PDRC) in Garowe, Puntland.
