= Ali Mohamed Warancadde =

Somali politician

Ali Mohamed Warancadde علي محمد ورنعاده
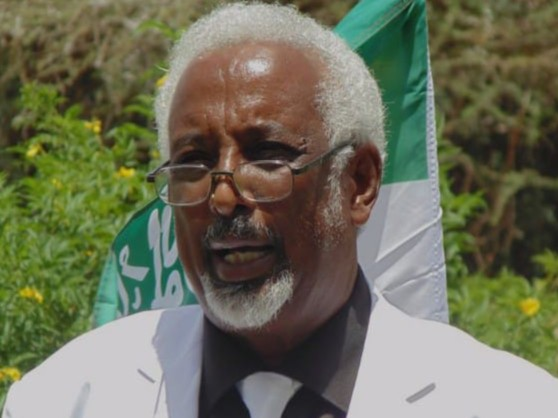

Minister of Interior
- In office 25 June 2013 – October 2016
- President: Ahmed Mohamed Mohamoud
- Preceded by: Mohamed Nour Arrale
- Succeeded by: Yasin Haji Mohamoud

Minister of Civil Aviation
- In office August 2006 – 27 July 2010
- President: Dahir Riyale Kahin
- Preceded by: Osman Hassan Mire
- Succeeded by: Mohamoud Hashi Abdi

Minister of Information
- In office ?–2001
- President: Muhammad Haji Ibrahim Egal
- Preceded by: Muse Hagi Mohamoud
- Succeeded by: Abdillahi Mohamed Duale

Personal details
- Party: United Peoples' Democratic Party; Peace, Unity, and Development Party

Ali Mohamed Warancadde (Somali: Cali Maxamed Warancadde) is a Somali politician. He formerly served as the Minister of Interior of Somaliland in Silanyo's administration, he also served as the Minister of Civil Aviation of Somaliland in Riyale's administration.

== Biography ==
Ali Waran'ade was born in the 1950s. He hails from the Habar Yoonis of Garhajis/Isaaq clan.

According to one account, Ali Waran'ade studied intelligence studies in Russia and received training with the Russian security agency KGB. He subsequently served for many years in the Somali National Security Service (Nabad-Sugid, NSS), the former state security agency under the Siad Barre government. In a 2015 report by Interpeace, the NSS was described as a "notorious" institution.

Ali Waran'ade played an important role in the peace and disarmament process in Somaliland following the civil war.

=== Information Minister ===
In June 2000, during a peace conference on Somalia held in Djibouti, Ali Waran'ade condemned the talks as undermining Somaliland's integrity and sovereignty, arguing that they would never be accepted in Somaliland, which would fight to defend its independence.

In April 2001, Ali Waran'ade criticised Somalia's Transitional National Government for interfering to prevent the Somaliland constitutional referendum from being held in Sool, Sanaag and Buhoodle District, insisting that these disputed areas were an integral part of Somaliland.

Later that same year, in 2001, the Minister of Information was replaced by Abdillahi Mohamed Duale.

=== Aviation Minister ===
In August 2006, President Dahir Riyale Kahin appointed Ali Waran'ade as Minister of Civil Aviation, replacing Nur Amin Ismail, who became Minister of the Presidency.

In June 2009, following Djibouti's constitutional amendment that enabled an extension of presidential terms, media reports suggested that Ali Waran'ade had implied Somaliland could pursue a similar course; however, he forcefully denied the claim in a subsequent press conference. However, his initial remarks sparked public backlash.

In July 2010, the newly inaugurated president Ahmed Mohamed Mohamoud "Silanyo" announced his cabinet appointments, naming Mohamoud Hashi Abdi as the new minister of aviation.

=== Former Aviation Minister ===
After incumbent president Dahir Riyale Kahin lost the 2010 presidential election, the former ruling UDUB party split when Kahin backed Ali Waran'ade—like himself a former officer in Somalia's National Security Service (NSS)—as the party's next presidential candidate, while former vice president Ahmed Yusuf Yasin supported Jamal Ali Hussain, who is from the same Isa Musa clan.; this internal division contributed to UDUB's failure to submit its registration as a political association in time for the 2012 municipal elections.

In January 2012, Ali Waran'ade argued in a press interview that a Somalia-related conference hosted by the United Kingdom and to which Somaliland had been invited risked marginalizing Somaliland's position in favor of a Somalia-centric agenda, and that Somaliland should not participate in such meetings. He also criticized President Silanyo's foreign policy, contending that it placed insufficient emphasis on respect for Somaliland's independence. However, President Silanyo attended the conference. At the conference, President Silanyo argued that supporting and recognising Somaliland would help to promote stability and recovery in Somalia.

In September 2012, Ali Waran'ade graduated from the University of Hargeisa alongside former vice president Abdirahman Aw Ali Farrah.

=== To Waddani, and to Kulmiye ===
In November 2012, Ali Waran'ade joined the Waddani political association. Explaining his decision, he argued that Somaliland needed a new political direction for the future and praised Waddani's platform for emphasizing values such as democracy, youth participation and governmental transparency. However, a few months later he joined the ruling Kulmiye party.

=== Interior Minister ===
In June 2013, Ali Waran'ade was appointed Minister of Interior by President Silanyo, replacing Mohamed Nour Arale in the post.

In February 2014, following the detention of three officials from the Federal Government of Somalia who had entered Somaliland without authorization, Interior Minister Ali Waran'ade stated that individuals acting on behalf of the Somalia government were not permitted to enter Somaliland under the current circumstances, but added that such entry could become possible if Somalia were to recognize Somaliland.

On 1 August 2016, media reports alleged that Ali Waran'ade had removed weapons from a Somaliland navy base, but the Ministry of Interior denied the claims and warned that it would not tolerate fake news or false accusations from the press.

=== Ambassador to Ethiopia ===
In mid-August 2016, President Silanyo appointed Yasin Haji Mohamoud as Minister of Interior in place of Ali Waran'ade; Silanyo had initially intended to name Ali Waran'ade as minister for civil aviation, but he instead requested the post of ambassador to Ethiopia, which was granted.

=== Presidential advisor ===
In December 2016, Ali Waran'ade was appointed as a special advisor to the president, while former planning minister Ali Shoombe was named as his successor as Somaliland's ambassador to Ethiopia.

In February 2017, Ali Waran'ade congratulated Mohamed Abdullahi "Farmaajo" on his election as president of Somalia and warned him not to follow his predecessors in ignoring the existence and independence of Somaliland.

In June 2018, Ali Waran'ade used a televised address to respond to questions about how he, as a perceived non-mainstream figure within the Kulmiye Party, could seek the presidency, arguing that Somaliland is a democratic state in which political choices should be based on ideas, ability and who can deliver, rather than on clan affiliation.

== Lion and Waran'ade ==
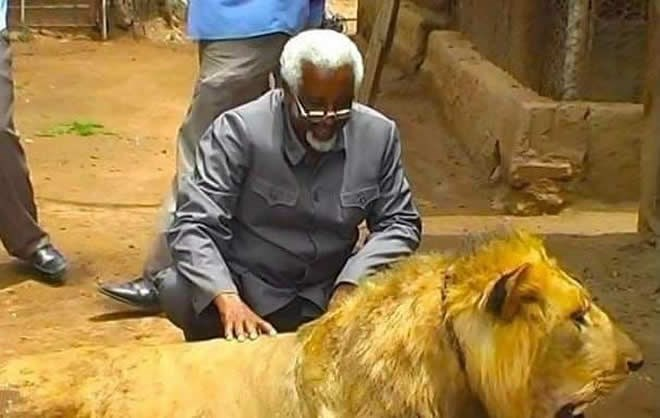
Warancadde caring for a lion at his own zoo

Ali Waran'ade keep several lions and operated them as a small private zoo, which is formally registered under the name of his son, Abdiqani Ali Mohamed Waran'ade.

In November 2010, following Djibouti's warm reception of the Somaliland president and his delegation, Ali Waran'ade announced that he would present a four-year-old lion as a gift to Djibouti's president Ismail Omar Guelleh.

In October 2017, a zookeeper at Ali Waran'ade's lion park in Hargeisa suffered minor injuries to his hand after being bitten by one of the lions. The incident was attributed to the keeper's failure to follow proper handling procedures by the owner, Abdiqani Ali Mohamed Waran'ade.

In April 2021, two lions escaped from the private zoo run by Ali Waran'ade in Hargeisa; one was recaptured, while the other attacked a woman and was subsequently shot dead by police officers.

In September 2024, photos of Somaliland president Muse Bihi Abdi riding on the back of a domesticated lion kept in Hargeisa went viral on social media, sparking extensive debate; the lion belonged to former interior minister Ali Waran'ade, who owns a private lion park in the city.

== See also ==
- Ministry of Civil Aviation (Somaliland)
- Ministry of Interior (Somaliland)
- Politics of Somaliland
- Cabinet of Somaliland

Political offices
Preceded by Osman Hassan Mire	Minister of Civil Aviation; 2007–2010	Succeeded by Mohamoud Hashi Abdi
Preceded by Mohamed Nour Arrale	Minister of Interior; 2013-2017	Succeeded by Yasin Haji Mohamoud
