= National Electoral Commission (Somaliland) =

Electoral agency of Somaliland

Republic of Somaliland National Electoral Commission
- Komishanka Doorashooyinka Qaranka
- Logo of the NEC

Commission overview
- Formed: 2001
- Type: Independent statutory body
- Jurisdiction: Somaliland
- Headquarters: Hargeisa, Somaliland
- Commission executive: Musa Hassan Yousuf, Chairman
- Website: www.slnec.net

The National Electoral Commission (NEC) (Somali: Komishanka Doorashooyinka Qaranka Somaliland; Arabic: لجنة الانتخابات الوطنية في صوماليلاند) is the national election commission of Somaliland.

The commission organizes Somaliland's presidential elections, parliamentary elections, local council elections and referendums. The current chairman of the commission is Musa Hassan Yousuf.

Chairpersons of the National Electoral Commission of the Republic of Somaliland (2002–2026) The following is a chronological list of the chairpersons who have led the National Electoral Commission (NEC) of the Republic of Somaliland, based on the dates provided.. No. Name of Chairperson Period of Service

1 Abdillahi Abdi Haji Omar (Jawaan) March 2002 – September 2002 2 Ahmed Haji Ali Adami October 2002 – February 2007 3 Mohamed Yusuf Ahmed September 2007 – March 2008 4 Mohamed Ismail Mohamed (Kaba-weyne) 22 March 2008 – December 2008 5 Jama Mahmoud Omar (Jama-Sweden) January 2009 – September 2009 6 Eng. Isse Yusuf Haji Mohamed (Isse Hamari) 2 November 2009 – 20 April 2014 7 Mohamed Ahmed Hirsi Geelle 22 April 2014 – November 2014 8 Eng. Abdikadir Iman Warsame 24 November 2014 – 30 November 2019 9 Abdirashid Mahmoud Ali (Riyo-Raac) December 2019 – June 2022 10 Muse Hassan Yusuf 17 September 2022 – Present (October 2026)

== Members ==
Chairpersons of the National Electoral Commission of the Republic of Somaliland (2002–2026) The following is a chronological list of the chairpersons who have led the National Electoral Commission (NEC) of the Republic of Somaliland, based on the dates provided.. No. Name of Chairperson Period of Service

1 Abdillahi Abdi Haji Omar (Jawaan) March 2002 – September 2002

2 Ahmed Haji Ali Adami October 2002 – February 2007

3 Mohamed Yusuf Ahmed September 2007 – March 2008

4 Mohamed Ismail Mohamed (Kaba-weyne) 22 March 2008 – December 2008

5 Jama Mahmoud Omar (Jama-Sweden) January 2009 – September 2009

6 Eng. Isse Yusuf Haji Mohamed (Isse Hamari) 2 November 2009 – 20 April 2014

7 Mohamed Ahmed Hirsi Geelle 22 April 2014 – November 2014

8 Eng. Abdikadir Iman Warsame 24 November 2014 – 30 November 2019

9 Abdirashid Mahmoud Ali (Riyo-Raac) December 2019 – June 2022

10 Muse Hassan Yusuf 17 September 2022 – Present (October 2026)

The commission consists of seven members. Three are nominated by the President of Somaliland, two are nominated by the House of Elders, and the remaining two are nominated by the opposition parties.

The nominees are then approved by the House of Representatives. The term of office of the commission is five years.
