= Ahmed Jambir Suldan =

Somaliland politician

- Axmed Jaambiir Suldaan

Minister of Interior of Somaliland
- In office 1995–1997
- Preceded by: Muse Bihi Abdi
- Succeeded by: Mohamed Abdi Gaboose

Minister of Interior of Somaliland
- In office 1999–2001

Personal details
- Profession: Politician

Ahmed Jambir Suldan (Somali: Axmed Jaambiir Suldaan) is a Somaliland politician who served three times as Minister of Interior of Somaliland during President Egal’s tenure.

== Biography ==
=== Early life and background ===
Ahmed Jambir Suldan comes from the royal Suldaan family within the Habar Awal (also known as Subeer Awal) branch of the Isaaq clan. His lineage, known as the Saldanada of Habar Awal, is said to trace its origins to around 1770 in Berbera.

=== Somali National Movement ===
Ahmed Jambir Suldan served as the last Treasurer (Xoghayaha Maaliyadda) of the Somali National Movement during its final phase before Somaliland declared independence.

Ahmed Jambir Suldan, as a member of the SNM Central Committee, voted in favor of the resolution to restore Somaliland’s independence.

=== Deputy Minister of Interior ===
In 1991, at the time of Somaliland’s declaration of independence, Ahmed Jambir Suldan was appointed Deputy Minister of Interior.

=== Minister of Interior (First Term) ===
In 1995, President Egal dismissed Muse Bihi Abdi from Minister of Interior following political disagreements, and appointed Ahmed Jambir Suldan as his replacement.

In 1997, after being re-elected, President Egal reshuffled his cabinet and appointed Mohamed Abdi Gaboose as Minister of Interior.

=== Minister of Interior (Second Term) ===
Later, Ahmed Jambir Suldan was reappointed as Minister of Interior. Records indicate that in June 2000, he received official documents in his capacity as Minister of Interior.

In June 2001, a constitutional referendum was held in Somaliland, during which Ahmed Jambir Suldan served as the chairman of the National Referendum Committee.

=== After that ===
In October 2009, when Suldan Mahamed Suldan Diriye — the sultan of Habar Awal — passed away, Ahmed Jambir Suldan attended the funeral in his capacity as a member of the Suldaan family.

As of 2012, Ahmed Jambir Suldan served as an advisor to the chairman of Gollis University, and he made public remarks during university events, including at a certificate-presentation ceremony held at Hotel Mansoor in Hargeisa.

In August 2017, Ahmed Jambir Suldan left the ruling Kulmiye Party and joined the opposition Waddani Party. He explained that his decision was due to the government’s policies, which had caused high inflation in the country. Ahmed Jambir Suldan was appointed by Waddani Party chairman Irro as the second of twelve members on the party’s Committee for Internal Affairs and Defense — the first being Chairman Irro himself.

In November 2020, Ahmed Jambir Suldan delivered a speech at a ceremony announcing a Waddani candidate’s run for Somaliland’s House of Representatives.

== Family ==
Ahmed Jambir Suldan had a son, Ismail, a basketball player for the North-West (GWG) team, who died in London in 2013 while his father is still alive.
