= Mohamoud Hashi Abdi =

Somaliland politician

Mohamoud Hashi Abdi محمود حاشي عبدي
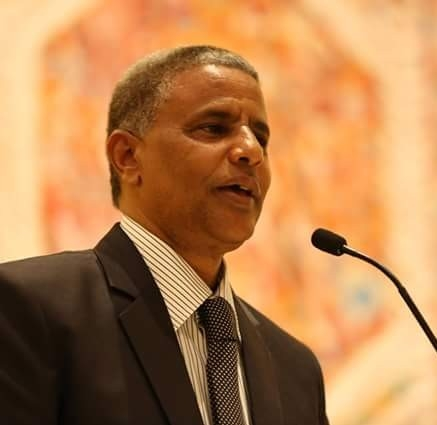

Chairman of Kaah
- Incumbent
- Assumed office 21 July 2022
- Preceded by: "Position established"

Minister of Presidency
- In office 28 October 2015 – 14 December 2017
- President: Ahmed Mohamed Mohamoud
- Preceded by: Hersi Ali Haji
- Succeeded by: Office dissolved

Minister of Civil Aviation and Air Transport
- In office 27 July 2010 – 28 October 2015
- President: Ahmed Mohamed Mohamoud
- Preceded by: Ali Mohamed Warancadde
- Succeeded by: Farhan Adan Haibe

Mayor of Burao
- In office 18 May 1991 – 2002
- Succeeded by: Mohamoud Hassan Dhagalab

Personal details
- Party: Kaah Alliance for Equality and Development
- Other political affiliations: Peace, Unity, and Development (2002–2022)

Mohamoud Hashi Abdi (Somali: Maxamuud Xaashi Cabdi), commonly known as Ina Xaashi, is a Somaliland politician, who served as the Minister of Civil Aviation and Air Transport of Somaliland from July 2010 to October 2015. In October 2015, after the resignation of several cabinet ministers, he was appointed as Minister of Presidency by then president Ahmed Mohamed Mohamoud (Siilaanyo). He also served as the Mayor of Burao from 1991 to 2002.

== Biography ==
In early 1991, Mohamoud Hashi was appointed mayor of Burao, a town then marked by war damage, with destroyed houses and public buildings, water pipes pulled from the ground, graves marked only by piles of stones, and areas suspected of being mined.

=== Aviation Minister ===
In July 2010, the newly elected president Ahmed Mohamed Mohamoud "Silanyo" announced his cabinet appointments and named Mohamoud Hashi as minister of civil aviation.

In January 2013, Somaliland's minister of civil aviation, Mohamoud Hashi, presented a new bill on airport service fees to the House of Representatives. The proposal, which would have allowed the civil aviation ministry rather than the finance ministry to collect a relatively high charge from passengers, was strongly opposed by MP Baar Said Farah and other legislators on the grounds that it risked mismanagement and possible corruption and placed an excessive burden on travellers.

In July 2014, after the Federal Government of Somalia asserted that it would assume full control of Somaliland’s airspace and refused to recognise Somaliland’s own air traffic management, Somaliland’s minister of civil aviation, Mohamoud Hashi, declared that the talks had collapsed.

=== Presidency Minister ===
In October 2015, President Silanyo announced replacements for ministers who had resigned the previous day, moving Mohamoud Hashi from Minister of Civil Aviation to Minister of the Presidency and reassigning Osman Abdilahi Sahardiid from Deputy Minister of Finance to Minister of Civil Aviation. His predecessor as minister of the presidency was Hersi Ali Haji Hassan.

In September 2016, in connection with clashes among Musa Abokor (Habr Je'lo/Isaaq) clans near Dararweyne in the Sanaag region, a youth group from Musa Abokor accused presidential affairs minister Mohamoud Hashi of exacerbating the conflict by supplying arms and inciting the fighting.

In March 2017, the Somaliland media outlet Berbera Today, quoting Hangoolnews, reported allegations that Mohamoud Hashi effectively controlled around US$15 million in Kuwaiti aid intended for the upgrading of Hargeisa airport, that Hargeisa airport service charges were being used at the discretion of the civil aviation ministry rather than through formal mechanisms and the finance ministry, that accounting for staff payments, subsidies and equipment purchases at the airport was opaque, that the Berbera port development deal with the UAE-based company DP World lacked transparency in its negotiations and revenue-sharing arrangements, that high-value properties he was said to own in Hargeisa and abroad might derive from improper use of public office, and that funds for water, infrastructure, equipment and road projects may have been spent without proper accounting or audit controls.

In December 2017, a fire broke out at Mohamoud Hashi’s residence in Hargeisa, burning the living room of a house with eleven rooms while the remaining rooms were preserved by firefighters The fire was caused by Amina, a woman who blackmailed Mahmoud into marrying her, in an attempt to kill his children.

In mid December 2017, Muse Bihi Abdi, who became the new president, announced his cabinet appointments, but no minister for the presidential office was appointed. Mohamoud Hashi was not appointed to any ministerial position.

=== Former Presidency Minister ===
In September 2018, amid a dispute over a house believed to be government property that Mohamoud Hashi had refurbished, officials from Somaliland’s Ministry of Public Works sought to register the property in the state land registry but were forcibly prevented from doing so by Hashi’s security guards.

In 2018, a former Presidential Minister, Hersi Ali Haji Hassan published his memoir Miyiga ilaa madaxtooyada : socdaalkaygii guusha (From bush to the presidential palace : the journey of my success). Responding to passages in the book which claimed that President Silanyo had suffered deteriorating health and diminished judgement towards the end of his term, in November 2018, Mohamoud Hashi rejected the allegation, insisting that Silanyo's physical condition and mental acuity had remained sound and arguing that, had the president not been healthy, he could not have governed the country effectively or achieved its successes.

In November 2018, the secretary for internal affairs of the opposition UCID party sharply criticized former ministers of the presidency Hersi Ali Haji Hassan and Mohamoud Hashi, accusing them of exaggerating the achievements of the Silanyo administration and boasting about their own roles, and arguing that rather than appearing before the public they ought to have left the country altogether.

In September 2020, Mohamoud Hashi accused President and Kulmiye chairman Muse Bihi Abdi of breaking his pledge to relinquish the party leadership after winning the presidential election.

For three days starting 4 October 2020, the ruling Kulmiye party held a congress at which it expelled several former senior government officials, including Mohamoud Hashi, from the party. However, the reasons for the expulsions were not made public.

=== Chairman of Kaah party ===
On 21 July 2022, Mohamoud Hashi and other politicians established a new political association in Somaliland called Kaah. Mohamoud Hashi was selected as the temporary chairman. He subsequently became the official chairman.

On 9 January 2025, Kaah was confirmed as one of Somaliland’s three official political parties, and Mohamoud Hashi, together with the leaders of the other two parties, made remarks praising the democratic maturity of the population and the emergence of a three-party system less marked by clan divisions. The leaders of these three parties all came from the Habr Je'lo clan.

In August 2025, after the establishment of a Northeastern Administration was proclaimed in Las Anod—a city that had been under de facto Somaliland control until 2023—and was recognised by the Federal Government of Somalia, Mohamoud Hashi warned that Somaliland would respond through political means by working to remove the Somali president, Hassan Sheikh Mohamud, from power.

== See also ==
- Ministry of Presidency
- Cabinet of Somaliland
- Ministry of Civil Aviation (Somaliland)

Political offices
Preceded by Ali Mohamed Warancadde	Minister of Civil Aviation and Air Transport; 2010-2015	Succeeded by Farhan Adan Haibe
Preceded by Hersi Ali Haji Hassan	Minister of Presidency; 2015-2017	Succeeded by Office dissolved
