= Hersi Ali Haji Hassan =

Somaliland opposition leader

- حرسي علي حاج حسن
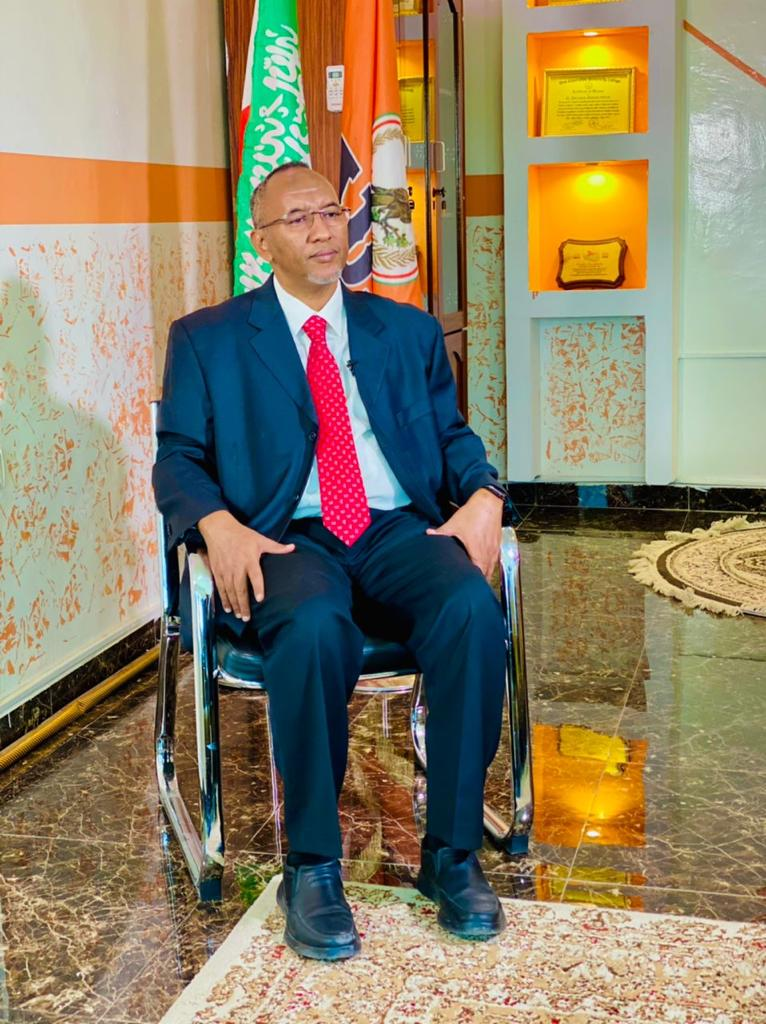
- Hassan in 2023

Chairman of Waddani Party
- Incumbent
- Assumed office 16 November 2021
- Preceded by: Abdirahman Mohamed Abdullahi "Irro"

Dahabshiil Group
- In office 29 september 1994 – 19 October 2010

National Electoral Commission Deputy Chairman
- In office February 2007 – May 2008

Chief of Cabinet
- In office July 2010 – July 2011

Minister of the Presidency
- In office July 2011 – 28 October 2015
- President: Ahmed Mohamed Mohamoud
- Succeeded by: Mohamoud Hashi Abdi

Personal details
- Born: 1968 (age 57–58) Burao, Somali Republic (now Somaliland)
- Party: Waddani

Hersi Ali Haji Hassan (Somali: Xirsi Cali Xaaji Xasan, born 1968) is a Somaliland politician and the current chairman of the Waddani party, the ruling party in Somaliland.

== Biography ==
Hersi was born in 1966 in Burao, capital of Togdheer region. He completed his secondary education in 1987, after which he joined the Somali National Movement (SNM) during the Somaliland War of Independence. He belongs to the Ahmed Farah subclan of the Habr Je'lo Isaaq.

After the war, he returned to education and studied in Somaliland, India and the United Kingdom where he studied different areas in ICT and Management.

He started his career at Dahabshiil Group, first from the Remittance Department to the CEO of Somtel International, one of the leading telecommunications companies in the Horn of Africa. Throughout his tenure at Dahabshiil, he was also appointed as the Deputy Chairman of the National Electoral Commission, a position he held for 1 year before joining politics.

He served as the Minister of the Presidency of Somaliland from 2011 to 2015 under the administration of Ahmed Mohamed Mohamoud (Siilaanyo), before later resigning.

Hersi joined the Waddani party in 2016 and was shortly appointed a party leader. In 2021 Hersi was elected the chairman of the Waddani opposition party of Somaliland, succeeding party founder Abdirahman Mohamed Abdullahi ('Irro).

== Political Career ==
=== Minister of the Presidency (2010–2015) ===
Hersi Ali Haji Hassan was appointed Minister of the Presidency in July 2011, having previously served as Chief of Cabinet to President Ahmed Mohamed Mohamoud (Siilaanyo). His tenure was characterized by a heavy focus on infrastructure and a significant centralization of executive power; analysts from the International Crisis Group frequently described him as the most influential figure within the Siilaanyo administration. He is credited with spearheading the "Waddo-Qaylo" (Call to the Roads) initiative, which utilized a combination of government funds and community-led fundraising to pave major thoroughfares, including the Erigavo road and the Hargeisa–Berbera highway. Additionally, he played a central role in Somaliland's foreign policy, serving as a lead negotiator in the formal dialogue process between Somaliland and Somalia that took place in London, Dubai, and Turkey between 2012 and 2015.

=== Resignation from Cabinet ===
In October 2015, Hersi led a historic mass resignation of over a dozen senior government officials, including several cabinet ministers and the presidency’s top advisors. The resignation was sparked by an internal power struggle within the ruling Kulmiye party regarding the succession of President Siilaanyo. Hersi and his allies publicly broke with the president over the endorsement of Muse Bihi Abdi as the party’s next presidential candidate, citing a lack of transparency and internal democracy within the party leadership. Following his departure, he transitioned to the opposition, eventually joining the Waddani party in 2016 and being elected as its national chairman in 2021.

== Writings ==
Hersi Ali is the author of two books:

- Miyiga illaa Madaxtooyada, 30 October 2018,
- Hodanka baahan iyo Himiladayda, 21 February 2020
