= Ministry of Civil Aviation (Somaliland) =

Government ministry of Somaliland

Republic of Somaliland Ministry of Civil Aviation & Air Transport
- Wasaaradda Duulista & Gaadiidka Hawada (MoCA)
- Coat of arms of Somaliland

Ministry overview
- Formed: 1993
- Preceding Ministry: Civil Aviation and Airports Authority (2017-present)
- Jurisdiction: Somaliland
- Headquarters: Hargeisa, Maroodi Jeh (Somaliland)
- Minister responsible: Fuad Ahmed Nuh

The Ministry of Civil Aviation & Air Transport of the Republic of Somaliland (MoCA) (Somali: Wasaaradda Duulista & Gaadiidka Hawada Somaliland) (Arabic: وزارة الطيران المدني) was a somaliland government ministry which is concerned about civil aviation, overseeing airport facilities, air traffic services and carriage of passengers and goods by air. The ministry also sets civil aviation regulations, sets airworthiness and all flight rules, to offer competitive and qualitative aviation services in order to fulfill the local and international requirements in the aviation sector. The current General Manager Omer Zayid Abdillahi Aden

== Ministers ==
=== Ministers of Civil Aviation & Air Transport ===
Image	Minister	Term start	Term end
	Abdillahi Mohamed Duale	March 1997	
	Mahamed Abdi		
	Osman Hassan Mire	July 2003	August 2004
	Nur Amin Ismail		August 2006
	Ali Mohamed Warancadde	August 2006	July 2010
	Mohamoud Hashi Abdi	July 2010	October 2015
	Farhan Aadan Haibe	2016	2017

=== Ministers of Civil Aviation and Airports Development ===
Image	Minister	Term start	Term end
	Fuad Ahmed Nuh	14 December 2024	Incumbent

== See also ==
- Politics of Somaliland
