= Kaah Alliance for Equality and Development =

Political party in Somaliland

Kaah Alliance for Equality and Development Isbahaysiga Sinnaanta iyo Horumarka Kaah
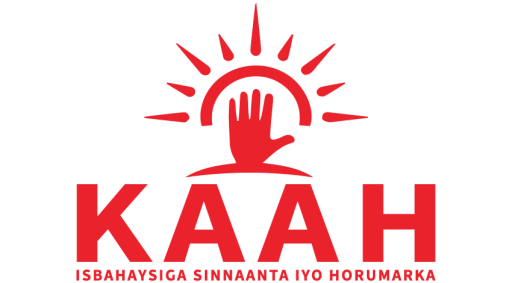
- Chairman: Mohamoud Hashi Abdi
- Founder: Mohamoud Hashi Abdi
- Founded: July 21, 2022; 4 years ago
- Split from: Kulmiye
- Headquarters: Hargeisa
- House of Representatives: 0 / 82
- Local councillors: 0 / 220

Party flag
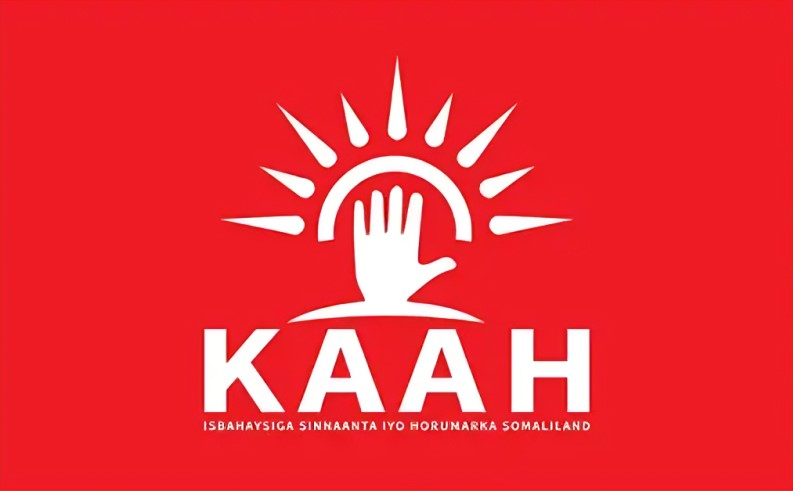

The Kaah Alliance for Equality and Development (Somali: Isbahaysiga Sinnaanta iyo Horumarka Kaah, also known as simply Kaah), is a political party in Somaliland. The party was founded by Mohamoud Hashi Abdi in July 2022 as a Political Association, ahead of the 2024 Somaliland national political party election. Kaah came in second in the election and officially became one of the three national political parties in Somaliland, replacing UCID.

The party has an alliance with the Waddani Party and supported their candidate and leader Abdirahman Mohamed Abdullahi in the 2024 presidential elections.

== Election results ==
=== Parliamentary elections ===
Election	Votes	%	Seats	+/–	Position
2026	TBD	TBD	TBD	New	▲

=== Local elections ===
Election	Votes	%	Seats	+/–	Position
2026	TBD	TBD	TBD	New	▲
