= Ministry of Interior (Somaliland) =

Government ministry of Somaliland

Republic of Somaliland Ministry of Internal Affairs & Security
- Wasaaradda Arrimaha Gudaha Iyo Amniga (MoIA)
- Coat of arms of Somaliland

Agency overview
- Formed: 1991; 35 years ago
- Jurisdiction: Somaliland
- Headquarters: Hargeisa, Maroodi Jeh (Somaliland)
- Agency executives: Abdalle Mohamed Arab, Minister; Abdirashid Mohammed Ahmed(Magalo), Deputy Minister; Mohamed Ali Mohamoud(Shabel), General Director
- Website: moi.govsomaliland.org

Footnotes
- Ministry of Interior on Facebook

The Ministry of Internal Affairs & Security Of Republic of Somaliland) "(MoIAS)" (Somali: Wasaaradda Arrimaha Gudaha Iyo Amniga Qaranka Jamhuuriyadda Somaliland) (Arabic: وزارة الداخلية) is a Somaliland government ministry, tasked and primarily responsible for the internal policies, state security, administration of internal affairs involving the state, the current minister is Abdalle Mohamed Arab

== Responsibilities ==
Here are some of the main responsibilities of the ministry :-

- Providing citizenship and permanent resident status.
- Issuing of entry visas and staying visas in the country.
- Inhabitants administration: personal registration.
- Protecting entryways into the country such as sea, air and land.
- Issuing export and import licenses.
- Possession of firearms and explosives.
- Identity of refugees and asylum seekers.
- Maintaining citizen's safety and public discipline

== Departments ==
This ministry has six official departments

== Ministers of Interior ==
Image	Minister	Term start	Term end
	Suleiman Mohamoud Adan	1991	
	Muse Bihi Abdi	1993	
	Ahmed Jambir Suldan		
	Mohamed Abdi Gaboose	February 1997	
	Ahmed Jambir Suldan		August 2001
	Abdillahi Omar Shige	August 2001	November 2002
	Ismail Adan Osman (Yare)	November 2002	May 2006
	Aden Mire Waqaf (Acting)	May 2006	August 2006
	Abdillahi Ismail Ali (Irro)	August 2006	July 2010
	Mohamed Abdi Gaboose	July 2010	August 2011
	Mohamed Nour Arrale	September 2011	June 2013
	Ali Mohamed Warancadde	June 2013	August 2016
	Yasin Haji Mohamoud	August 2016	December 2017
	Mohamed Kahin Ahmed	December 2017	December 2024
	Abdalle Mohamed Arab (Sandheere)	December 2024	Present
