= 2012 Somaliland municipal elections =

Local elections in Somaliland

- 28 November 2012
	First party	Second party	Third party
Party	Kulmiye Peace, Unity, and Development Party	Waddani	For Justice and Development
Last election	83,158; 18.90%	49,444; 20.20%	179,389; 11.24%
Seats won	99	68	40
Popular vote	244,795	163,789	105,105
Percentage	30.19%	20.20%	12.96%
	Fourth party	Fifth party	Sixth party
Party	Umadda	Rays	Xaqsoor
Seats won	37	32	31
Popular vote	94,689	83,596	74,204
Percentage	11.68%	10.31%	9.15%
	Seventh party
Party	Dalsan
Seats won	16
Popular vote	44,680
Percentage	5.51%

Municipal elections were held across Somaliland on 28 November 2012. Two of the existing parties, For Justice and Development and the Peace, Unity, and Development Party contested the elections alongside six newly registered political associations.

== Results ==
Party	Votes	%	Seats
Kulmiye	244,795	30.19	99
Waddani	163,789	20.20	68
For Justice and Development	105,105	12.96	40
Umadda	94,689	11.68	37
Rays	83,596	10.31	32
Xaqsoor	74,204	9.15	31
Dalsan	44,680	5.51	16
Total	810,858	100.00	323
Source: Africa Portal

=== By Region ===
Table : Votes for each political party/association by region and rank, 2012
Region	Umadda			UCID			Kulmiye			Dalsan			Rays			Waddani			Xaqsoor			Total Valid Votes
	Votes	%	Rank	Votes	%	Rank	Votes	%	Rank	Votes	%	Rank	Votes	%	Rank	Votes	%	Rank	Votes	%	Rank	
Awdal	12,477	10.90%	4	14,101	12.32%	3	39,803	34.77%	1	8,795	7.68%	7	6,465	5.65%	5	24,239	21.18%	2	8,579	7.50%	6	114,459
Marodi Jeh	28,544	9.07%	5	55,185	17.54%	3	84,834	26.96%	1	24,578	7.81%	7	19,053	6.06%	6	56,109	17.83%	2	46,360	14.73%	4	314,663
Sahil	2,362	4.13%	6	14,562	25.44%	2	21,859	38.18%	1	1,426	2.49%	4	4,026	7.03%	7	10,306	18.00%	3	2,710	4.73%	5	57,251
Togdheer	29,144	18.16%	3	9,541	5.95%	5	47,228	29.43%	1	3,185	1.98%	4	27,097	16.89%	7	38,624	24.07%	2	5,641	3.52%	6	160,460
Sool	5,241	10.61%	5	3,876	7.85%	6	16,740	33.90%	1	2,092	4.24%	3	7,039	14.25%	7	8,907	18.04%	2	5,488	11.11%	4	49,383
Sanaag	16,921	14.76%	4	7,840	6.84%	5	34,331	29.95%	1	4,604	4.02%	3	19,916	17.37%	7	25,604	22.33%	2	5,426	4.73%	6	114,642
Total	94,689	11.68%	27	105,105	12.96%	24	244,795	30.19%	—	44,680	5.51%	28	83,596	10.31%	39	163,789	20.20%	13	74,204	9.15%	31	810,858
Source	Africa Portal																					

=== By District ===
The following table details the distribution of the 323 local council seats across Somaliland's districts during the 2012 elections. The governing Kulmiye party secured a plurality of seats, while the newly formed Waddani association emerged as the primary challenger. Data is aggregated by region, with Maroodi-Jeex serving as the largest electoral block. Note that data for the districts of Badhan and Dhahar was unavailable for this cycle.

Table: Seats won by each political party/association by district, 2012
District	Umadda	UCID	Kulmiye	Dalsan	Rays	Waddani	Xaqsoor	Total
Baki	2	0	5	2	—	3	1	13
Borame	3	3	7	1	2	4	1	21
Lughaya	0	2	6	0	—	2	3	13
Saylac	1	3	6	1	—	4	2	17
AWDAL	6	8	24	4	2	13	7	64
Baligubadle	0	1	2	1	0	2	7	13
Gabiley	1	4	7	2	2	4	1	21
Hargeysa	3	4	7	2	1	4	4	25
Salaxley	0	5	3	0	1	2	2	13
MAROODI-JEEX	4	14	19	5	4	12	14	72
Berbera	1	5	9	0	2	3	1	21
Sheekh	0	3	4	1	0	4	1	13
SAAXIL	1	8	13	1	2	7	2	34
Burco	3	1	7	0	4	5	1	21
Buuhodle*	3	2	7	—	3	2	0	17
Oodweyne	7	1	1	1	0	6	1	17
TOGDHEER	13	4	15	1	7	13	2	55
Caynabo	1	0	6	0	4	2	0	13
LasCaanood	2	3	6	1	0	4	5	21
Xuddun	5	0	0	2	—	6	0	13
SOOL	8	3	12	3	4	12	5	47
Ceel-Afweyn	1	1	8	1	3	3	0	17
Ceerigabo	4	2	5	1	2	6	1	21
Gar'adag	0	0	3	0	8	2	0	13
Badhan	—	—	—	—	—	—	—	—
Dhahar	—	—	—	—	—	—	—	—
SANAAG	5	3	16	2	13	11	1	51
Total	37	40	99	16	32	68	31	323

== Aftermath ==
In accordance with the Constitution of Somaliland, only the top 3 parties in the election are made legal parties and allowed to contest elections for the next 10 years. The KULMIYE and UCID parties retained their party status first gained in 2002 and Waddani became the countries newest party, having come in second in the elections. All other political associations subsequently dissolved and their elected representatives joined official parties.
