= Mohamed Kahin Ahmed =

Somaliland politician and chairman of Kulmiye

Mujahid Mohamed Kahin Ahmed
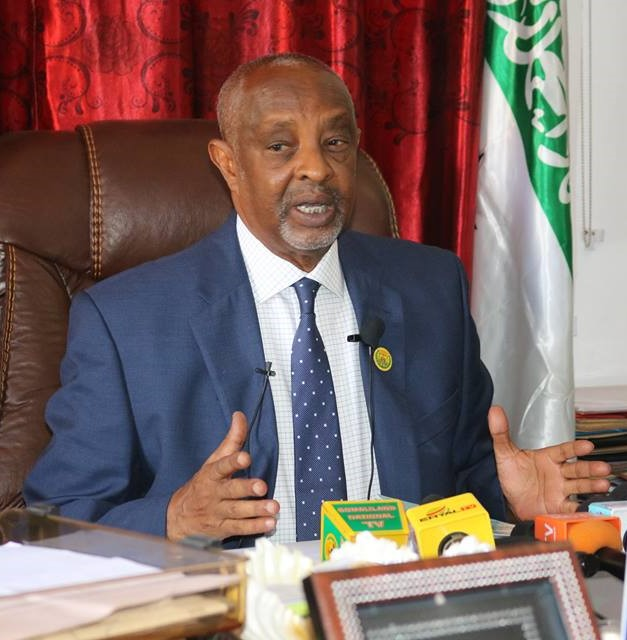
- Mohamed in 2023

Minister of Interior
- In office 14 December 2017 – 14 December 2024
- President: Muse Bihi Abdi
- Preceded by: Yasin Haji Mohamoud
- Succeeded by: Abdalle Mohamed Arab

Chairman of Peace, Unity, and Development Party
- Incumbent
- Assumed office 21 August 2023
- President: Muse Bihi Abdi
- Preceded by: Muse Bihi Abdi

Personal details
- Born: 1 July 1953 (age 73) Burao, British Somaliland
- Citizenship: Somalilander
- Party: Peace, Unity, and Development Party
- Education: (Soviet Union) Kyiv Higher Combined Arms Command School

Military service
- Allegiance: Somali Democratic Republic (1970-1982); Somali National Movement (1982-1991); Somaliland (1991-present)
- Branch/service: Somali National Army
- Battles/wars: Ogaden War; Somaliland War of Independence

Mohamed Kahin Ahmed (Somali: Maxamed Kaahin Axmed, Arabic: محمد كاهن أحمد) is a Somaliland politician and former military officer of the Somali National Movement. He serves as chairman of the Kulmiye party since 21 August 2023. He also served as the Minister of Interior of Somaliland from 14 December 2017 until 13 December 2024 when he was succeeded by Abdalle Mohamed Arab.

== Career ==
=== Early life ===
Mohamed Kahin Ahmed Mohamud was born in Burao, capital of the Togdheer region of Somaliland. He completed his primary and Quranic education in Beer in Togdheer. He completed his higher education at Burao Technical Institute. He belongs to the Rer Dahir subclan of the Habr Je'lo, part of the wider Isaaq clan-family.

=== Military career ===
Mohamed enlisted in the Somali National Army in 1970, after which he left for the Soviet Union and attended the Kyiv Higher Combined Arms Command School. He returned in 1973 after completing his military studies after which he was promoted to the rank of officer. He served in this capacity in numerous cities, including Garowe, Galkayo, Dhusomareb, Mogadishu and Hargeisa.

He fought in the 1977 Ogaden War in the Degehabur and Jigjiga fronts and was promoted to military operative and later to deputy commander of a battalion. He later served in the Somali military intelligence wing of the 26th Division of the Somali Army, headquartered in Hargeisa. He also taught in a military institute in Mogadishu.

=== Commander in the SNM ===
Mohamed, along with four other officers defected to the Somali National Movement (SNM) in 1982, being among the first military officers to do so. Mohamed launched and commanded numerous SNM attacks and offensives against the Somali regime, including an offensive into the Golis Mountains in 1984 where he led the SNM's 1st Brigade based in Balidhaye. The 1st Brigade, consisting of 130 soldiers, assaulted the Meriya mountains on 27 November, inflicting heavy casualties on Siad Barre's forces before retreating back to their base in Balidhaye.

On 17 October 1984, the 1st Brigade of the SNM, led by Lihle and Mohamed Kaahin, launched an offensive on the SNA contingency based in Burco-Duurray, a town in the Jarar zone in Ethiopia near the border with Somaliland. The 1st Brigade consisted of around 400 men at the time, while the SNA contingency based in the area consisted of 1,000 men, as well as 70 technicals and other heavy military vehicles. Heavy clashes ensued whereby the SNM lost 27 men, including the commander of SNM's military wing Mohamed Hashi Lihle, while the SNA lost 170 soldiers as well as 17 military vehicles.

Mohamed was later appointed Commander-in-Chief of the SNM in April 1988 by the SNM chairman Ahmed Mohamed Mohamoud (Siilaanyo).

=== Political career ===
Mohamed served as the first Somaliland Minister of Defence in 1991. On 14 December 2017 he was appointed by then-president Muse Bihi Abdi as Minister of Interior which he served for 7 years until he succeeded by Abdalle Mohamed Arab on 14 December 2024.

On 21 August 2023, he was appointed chairman of the Kulmiye party, one of Somaliland's three political parties, having been a prominent member of the party since its foundation. He had previously served as the deputy chairman of the party from July 2010 to December 2017.

== See also ==
- Ministry of Interior (Somaliland)
- Peace, Unity, and Development Party
- List of Somalis

Political offices
Preceded by Yasin Haji Mohamoud	Minister of Interior; 2017–present	Incumbent
